= Minor Seminary in Częstochowa =

School in Częstochowa, Silesia, Poland

- Niższe Seminarium - Liceum Humanistyczne w Częstochowie

Location
- ul. Piotrkowska 17; Częstochowa, (Częstochowa), Silesian 42-200; Poland
- Coordinates: 50°48′20″N 19°07′25″E.

Information
- Type: Private, boarding school and high school seminary
- Motto: Walk generously and with a pure heart for Christ!
- Religious affiliation: Catholic Church
- Patron saint: Saint Joseph
- Established: 1951
- Founder: Zdzisław Goliński
- Rector: Jerzy Bielecki
- Grades: 1-4
- Song: Build faith
- Newspaper: Niezwykła Szkoła

Minor Seminary in Częstochowa (Polish: Niższe Seminarium - Liceum Humanistyczne w Częstochowie) is a Roman Catholic minor seminary, a private general education liceum, all male boarding school in Poland for those who are considering a vocation to the priesthood. It is operated by the Archdiocese of Częstochowa. The school is located in the town of Częstochowa. It is a four-year general education liceum with an extended curriculum for the Polish language, history and philosophy.

== History ==
The school was founded on July 16, 1951 by the then bishop of Częstochowa, Zdzisław Goliński, and began its activity on September 1, 1951. The first director was Father Bronisław Panek, vicar of the parish of St. Roch in Częstochowa. Pupils of the first school year 1951/52 were educated and at the same time were accommodated in the buildings of the Institute of the Brothers of the Christian Schools on Pułaskiego Street and the Sisters of the Sacred Heart of Jesus on Paulińska Street (now Bishop Teodora Kubina Street). In teaching, the curriculum of the state high school of the humanities type was implemented. Lasallian Brothers helped with teaching.

On August 31, 1952, the Bishop of Częstochowa, Zdzisław Goliński, granted the school a statute. In September 1952, the new boarding house for the students was the building of the orphanage run by the Sisters of the Blessed Virgin Mary at Piotrkowska Street. In the years 1954–1956, the rector of the minor seminary was Stefan Bareła, who later became the bishop of Częstochowa. From September 1, 1957 until today, the minor seminary operates at 17 Piotrkowska Street. Since the beginning of the 1992/1993 school year, the school has the authority of a public school.

On April 18, 1998, the 1st Congress of minor seminary alumni took place. On December 7, 1998, Archbishop Stanisław Nowak granted another, new statute, taking into account system changes and new education laws. In 1999, the NSD in Częstochowa pilgrimage to Rome took place on the occasion of the Great Jubilee, combined with a meeting with Pope John Paul II. NSD AC has its own anthem - "Build faith", according to the words and music of priest Marek Cisowski, and its banner. The Holy Mass on the occasion of the 50th anniversary of the school in 2001 was presided over by the Apostolic Nuncio in Poland, Józef Kowalczyk. It took place in the cathedral in Częstochowa. In 2016, on the occasion of the school's 65th anniversary, a pilgrimage of students and teachers to Rome combined with a meeting with Pope Francis. On May 1, 2021, on the occasion of the 70th anniversary of the school, a Holy Mass was held in the Częstochowa cathedral under the leadership of the Archbishop of Częstochowa, Wacław Depo.

Music and musical education was taught at the Minor Seminary by musician and composer professor Antoni Szuniewicz. Krzysztof Wielgut taught physics and history of Poland for 31 years. Professor Edward Mąkosza, a composer, founder of the Częstochowa Philharmonic, doctor Ignacy Kozielewski, author of the scout hymn and co-founder of Polish scouting, priest Franciszek Musiel, later auxiliary bishop of Częstochowa, also worked at the school. In the years 1965–1969 the school tutor was Father Jan Związek, later rector of the Major Seminary of the Archdiocese of Częstochowa in 1985–1992. Bishop Dariusz Kałuża is a graduate of the school.
