= Kazimierz Górny =

Polish Roman Catholic bishop

- Bishop emeritus of Rzeszów
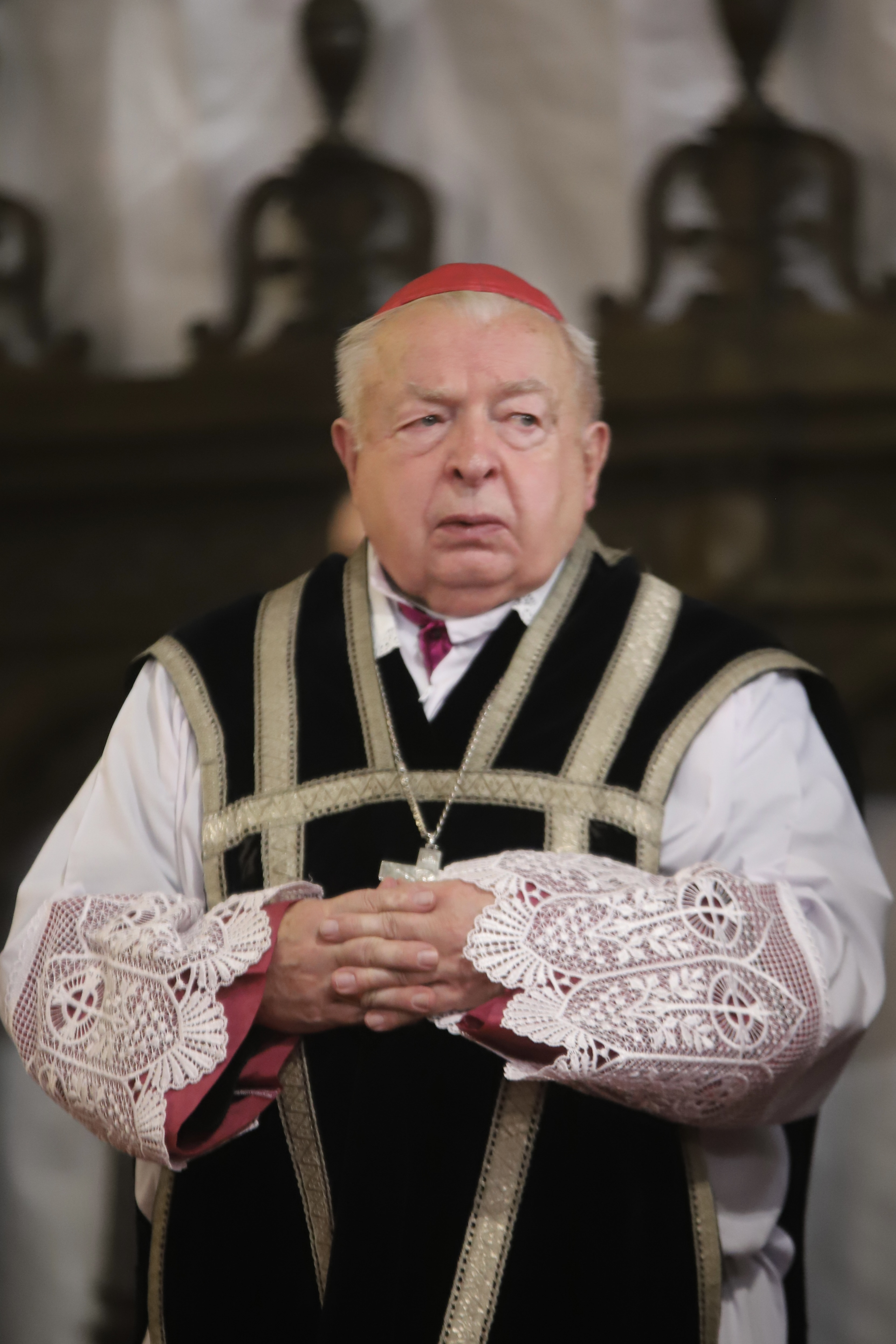
- Kazimierz Gorny in 2018
- Installed: 11 April 1992
- Term ended: 14 June 2013
- Successor: Jan Wątroba
- Previous post: Auxiliary bishop of Kraków (1984 – 1992)

Orders
- Ordination: 29 June 1960 by Karol Wojtyła
- Consecration: 6 January 1985 by Pope John Paul II

Personal details
- Born: 24 December 1937 (age 88) Lubień, Lesser Poland Voivodeship
- Motto: Omnia Tibi

Kazimierz Górny (born 24 December 1937) is the former bishop of the Roman Catholic Diocese of Rzeszów.

== Biography ==
Górny was born in 1937 in Lubień to Stanisław and Barbara Górny. After attending minor seminary and completing secondary schooling in Kraków, he entered the archdiocesan seminary for the Archdiocese of Kraków in 1955. He was ordained a priest on 29 June 1960 by Karol Wojtyła, auxiliary bishop of Kraków. Between 1970 and 1977, he worked at the metropolitan curia of the Archdiocese, where he oversaw a department of pastoral care. In 1977, he was made dean of the deanery of Oświęcim. He was made a Chaplain of His Holiness on 8 September 1983.

On 26 October 1984, Górny was appointed by Pope John Paul II as auxiliary bishop of Kraków; he was consecrated on 6 January 1985 at St. Peter's Basilica by John Paul II. He served on the Commission of Pastoral Care for the Polish Episcopal Conference beginning in 1985. On 25 March 1992, he was appointed bishop of Rzeszów, assuming the role on 11 April. He served in this position until 14 April 2013, when he resigned as bishop.
