= Jan Wątroba =

Polish priest

- Bishop of Rzeszów
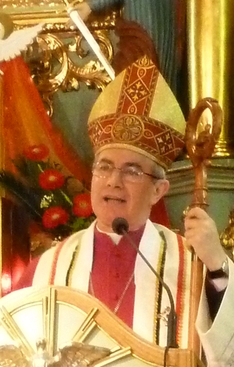
- Wątroba in 2013
- Previous post(s): Auxiliary bishop of Częstochowa (2000 –2013); Titular bishop of Bisica (2000 – 2013)

Orders
- Ordination: 27 May 1979 by Stefan Bareła
- Consecration: 20 May 2000 by Stanisław Nowak

Personal details
- Born: 4 December 1953 (age 71); Wieluń

Jan Franciszek Wątroba (born 4 December 1953) is the current Roman Catholic bishop of Rzeszów, in Poland.

He was Ordained Priest in Częstochowa in 1979.

== See also ==
- Roman Catholic Diocese of Rzeszów#Leadership
