= Antoni Długosz =

21st-century Polish Catholic bishop

- Auxiliary Bishop Emeritus of Częstochowa
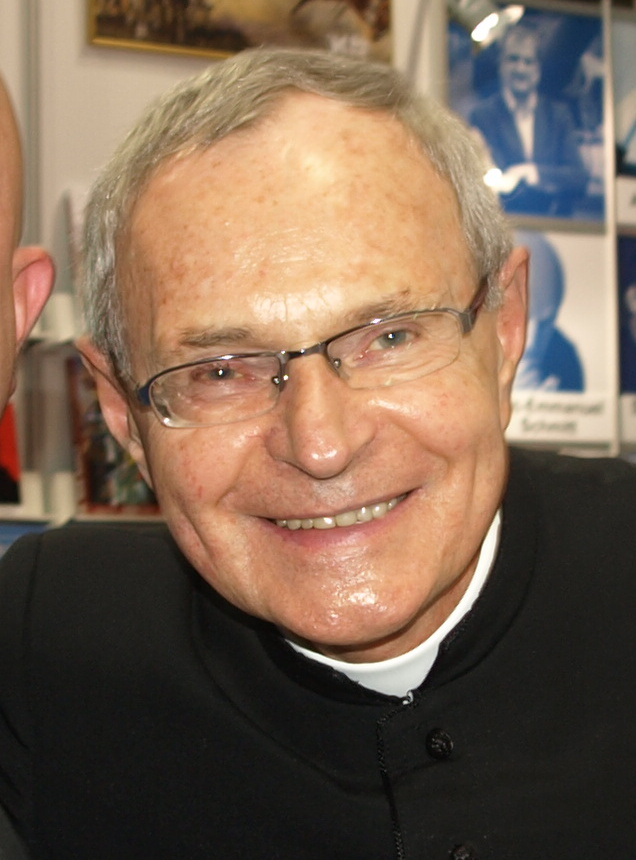
- Długosz in 2011
- Church: Roman Catholic Church
- Province: Częstochowa
- In office: 18 December 1993 – 7 May 2016
- Other post: Titular Bishop of Aggar

Orders
- Ordination: 20 June 1965 by Stefan Bareła
- Consecration: 6 January 1994 by John Paul II
- Rank: Bishop

Personal details
- Born: 18 April 1941 (age 85) Częstochowa, Poland
- Motto: Servire

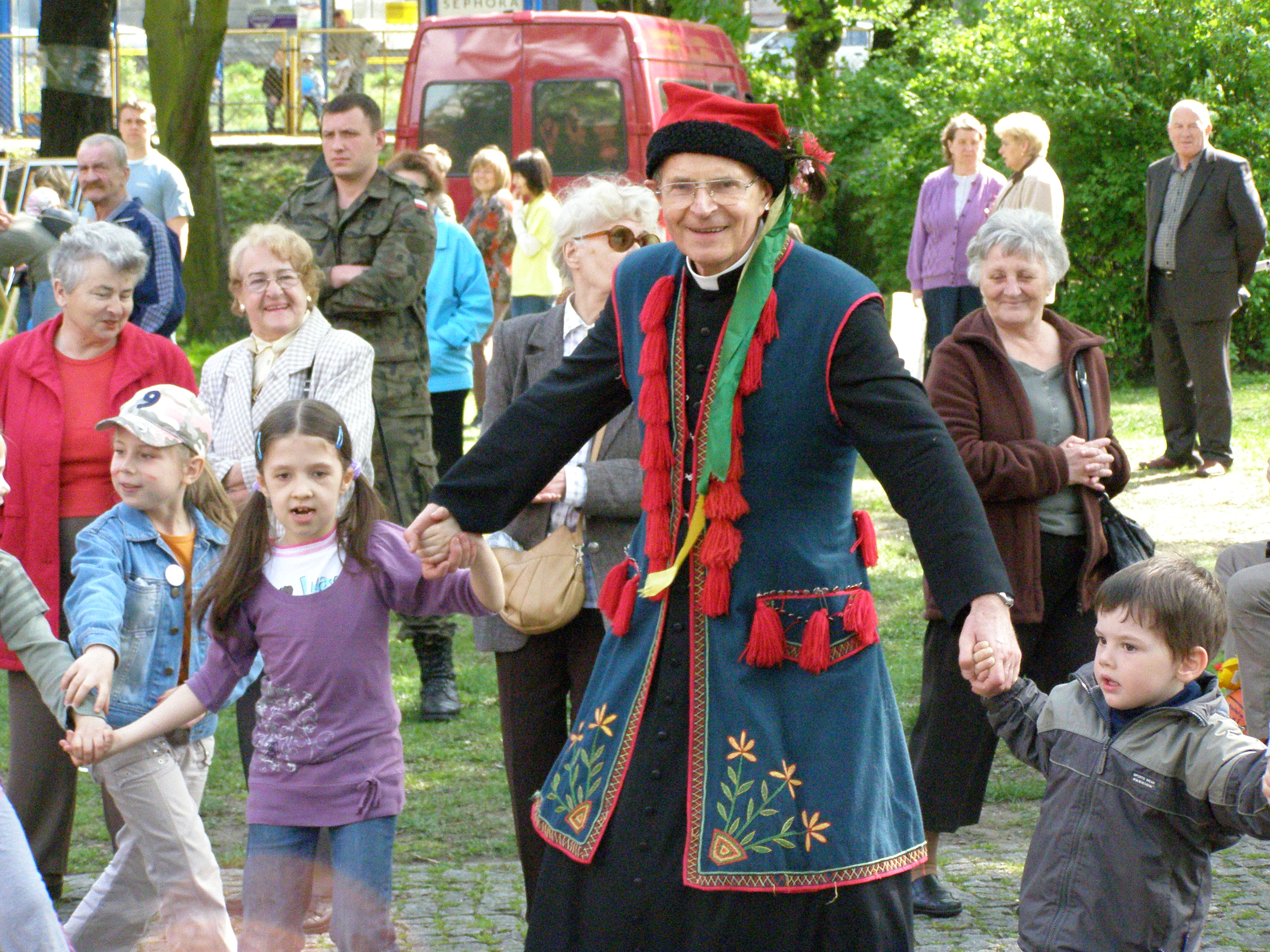
Biskup Antoni Długosz (Bydgoszcz, 2008)

Antoni Józef Długosz (born 18 April 1941) is a Polish Roman Catholic bishop who was the Auxiliary Bishop of the Częstochowa between 1993 and 2016 and is the Titular Bishop of Aggar since 1993.

== Biography ==
=== Early life ===
Długosz was born on 18 April 1941 in Częstochowa. In the years 1959 to 1965, he studied at the Higher Interdiocesan Seminary in Częstochowa. He received his ordination on 20 June 1965 at the Częstochowa Cathedral by Bishop Stefan Bareła. In the years 1968–1971 he completed specialist studies in the field of Biblical studies at the Cardinal Stefan Wyszyński University, Warsaw. At the same university, in the year 1973–1976 he deepened his specialization in the field of catechetics, after which he obtained a doctorate based on his dissertation "Opowieść o Gedeonie (Sdz 6–8), w świetle współczesnej teologii biblijnej".

In 1975 he began lecturing on catechetics at the Częstochowa Major Seminary in Kraków. He taught the same subject in the years 1977–1979 at the Krakow Metropolitan Seminary. He also gave lectures on catechetics at the Theological Institute in Częstochowa, the Sosnowiec Higher Seminary in Kraków, the Theological College in Sosnowiec and the Jesuit University of Philosophy and Education Ignatianum.

=== Ordination as Bishop ===
On 18 December 1993, he was appointed as the Auxiliary Bishop of the Częstochowa as well as the Titular Bishop of Aggar by Pope John Paul II. Długosz was consecrated on 6 January 1994 at the St. Peter's Basilica by Pope John Paul II with the help of Archbishop (later Cardinal) Giovanni Battista Re and Archbishop Josip Uhač. For his episcopal motto, Długosz chose the word "Servire" (Service)".

On 7 May 2016, Pope Francis accepted his resignation from the post of Auxiliary Bishop.
