= Stefan Bareła =

Polish Roman Catholic bishop (1916 – 1984)

- Bishop of Częstochowa
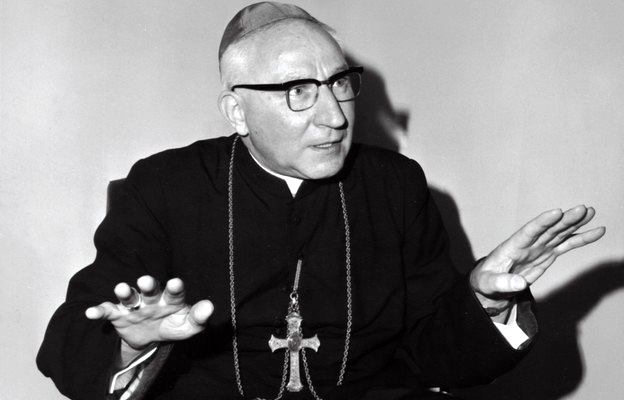
- Appointed: 10 January 1964
- Predecessor: Zdzisław Goliński
- Successor: Stanisław Nowak
- Previous posts: Auxiliary bishop of Częstochowa (1960 – 1964); Titular bishop of Illarima (1960 – 1964)

Orders
- Ordination: 25 March 1944 by Teodor Kubina
- Consecration: 8 January 1961 by Zdzisław Goliński

Personal details
- Born: 24 June 1916 Zapolice
- Died: 12 February 1984 (aged 67)
- Motto: Veritati et Caritati

Stefan Bareła (24 June 1916 – 12 February 1984) was a Polish Roman Catholic bishop of the Diocese of Częstochowa from 1964 to his death in 1984.

== Biography ==
Bareła was born in Zapolice to Józef and Stefania Bareła. He received primary education at Zapolice and Kodrąb; after this, he attended a gymnasium in Radom and the minor seminary in Sandomierz, obtaining his matura from the latter in 1938. He began attending the diocesan seminary of the Diocese of Częstochowa in Kraków on 1 September 1939, in addition to attending philosophy lectures at Jagiellonian University. He received his tonsure on 21 December 1940 at a church of the Convent of the Sacred Heart located in Kraków; he was ordained to the minor orders of porter and lector at the same church on 20 December 1941. Bareła was then ordained to the minor orders of exorcist and acolyte on 19 August 1942 at Skałka; he was ordained to the subdiaconate on 18 July 1943, the diaconate on 27 February 1944 and finally was ordained a priest on 25 March 1944 by Teodor Kubina.

After his ordination, Bareła continued to study canon law at Jagiellonian University. He was also appointed prefect of the diocesan seminary at Kraków and was later appointed to serve at a parish at Dąbrowa Górnicza on 16 August 1945 after various vacancies resulting from the German persecution of Catholic priests. He defended his doctoral dissertation, concerning the history of the parish of Wieruszów, at Jagiellonian University on 5 May 1950. He was appointed chaplain to Zdzisław Goliński on 14 July 1951 and secretary of the pastoral department at the diocesan curia of the Diocese of Częstochowa on 8 September 1951. He also received a scholarship to undergo specialized studies for two years, in order to prepare for a habilitation in moral theology at the Catholic University of Lublin. After returning to the Diocese of Częstochowa, he was appointed deputy rector of the minor seminary in Częstochowa on 1 September 1954. (Note: Some sources state that Bareła was appointed vicerector of the minor seminary, though the minor seminary states that Bareła was appointed as its rector.) He was appointed professor of moral and pastoral theology at the diocesan seminary at Kraków in 1956, also undertaking the role of spiritual father.

On 26 October 1960, Bareła was appointed auxiliary bishop of Częstochowa and titular bishop of Illarima by Pope John XXIII. He was additionally appointed vicar general of the Diocese of Częstochowa on 14 December 1960. On 8 January 1961, he was consecrated by Zdzisław Goliński; his co-consecrators were Karol Wojtyła (later Pope John Paul II) and Stanisław Czajka. On 17 January 1964, he was appointed bishop of Częstochowa. He attended the second, third and final sessions of the Second Vatican Council during this period.

On 10 February 1966, Bareła was appointed chairman of the Marian commission of the Polish Episcopal Conference; he held this position until his death. He established the Higher Institute of Theology, located in Częstochowa, in the same year, and called the second diocesan synod of the Diocese of Częstochowa in 1975. Bareła was diagnosed with colon cancer in 1983, dying on 12 February 1984.
