= Sulmierzyce Madonna =

Painting by Lucas Kranach the Elder

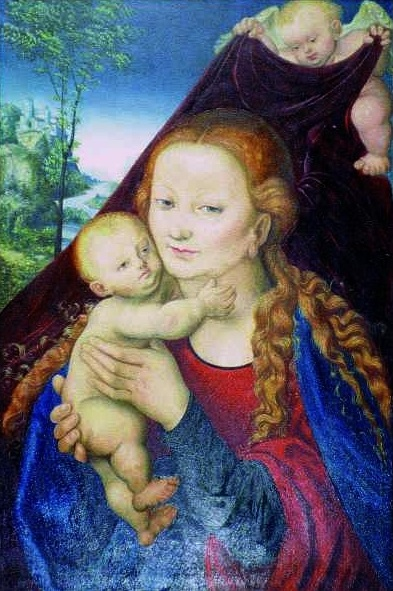
The Madonna and Child

The Madonna and Child is a painting by Lucas Kranach the Elder (1472–1553). The oil painting was probably brought to Poland by Jan Sulimirski and placed in the parish church of Sulimierzyce, the ancestral seat of the Sulimirski/Sulimierski family around 1550. Alternately, it might have been brought to Poland by Roch of Sulmierzyce, who served as abbot of Częstochowa from 1598 to 1612. On March 15, 1666, Church authorities declared the painting to be miraculous, as it had survived several fires and plundering by many invading armies. It continued to be venerated throughout the region until it was stolen in 1995 from the church.

On June 23, 2024, a copy of the Miraculous Icon was presented to the parish of St. Erasmus in Sulmierzyce, during which Andrzej Przybylski, the auxiliary bishop of the Archdiocese of Częstochowa said the Eucharist.
