= Antopol =

Antopol may refer to:

- Russian name for Antopal in present-day Belarus
- Antopol, Łódź Voivodeship (central Poland)
- Antopol, Puławy County in Lublin Voivodeship (east Poland)
- Antopol, Gmina Podedwórze in Lublin Voivodeship (east Poland)
