= Florentynów =

Florentynów may refer to the following places:

- Florentynów, Pabianice County in Łódź Voivodeship (central Poland)
- Florentynów, Radomsko County in Łódź Voivodeship (central Poland)
- Florentynów, Zgierz County in Łódź Voivodeship (central Poland)
