= High school seminary =

Catholic high school for boys considering pursuing ordination

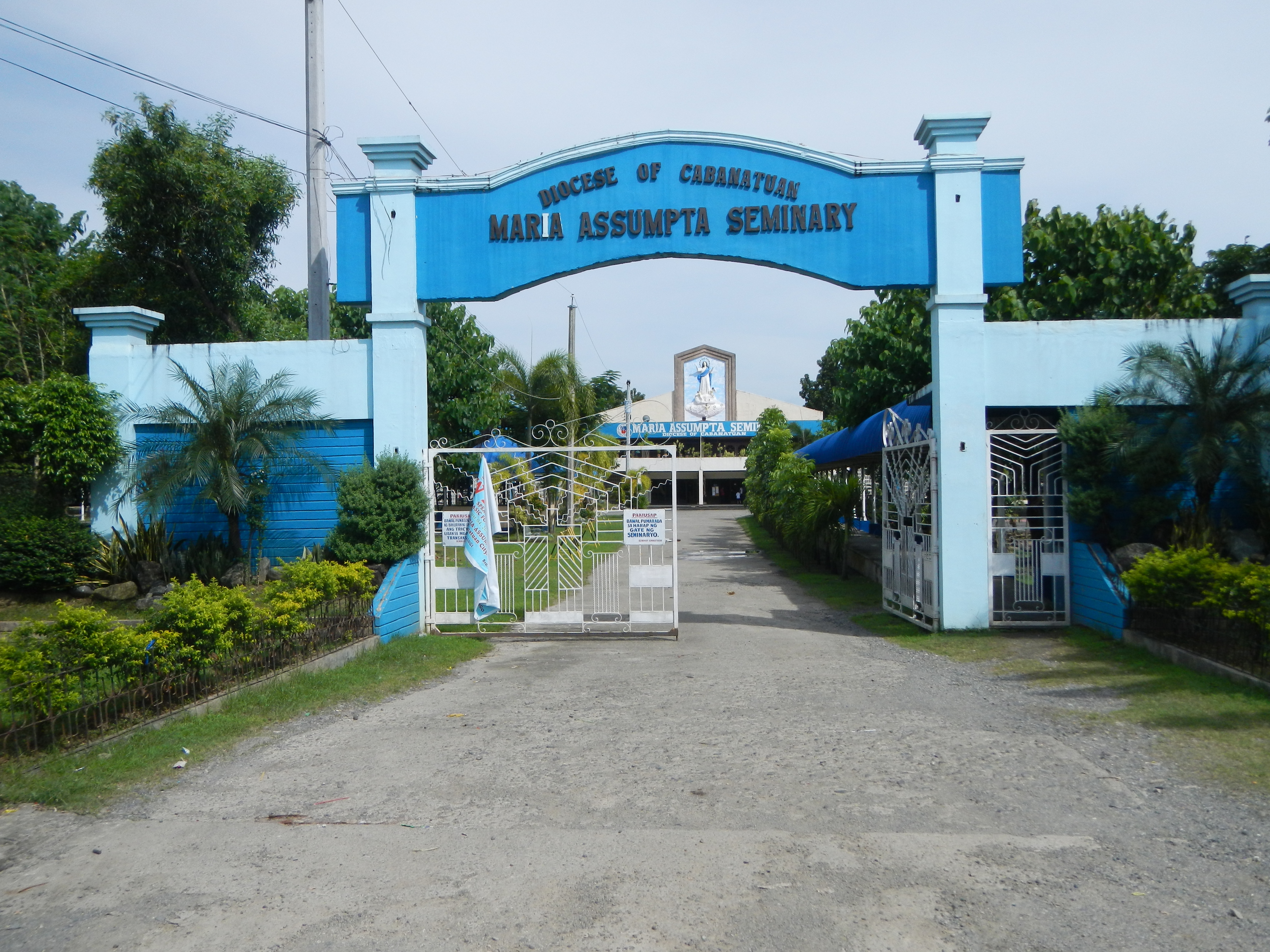
Maria Assumpta Seminary – high school (minor) and college seminary of the Diocese of Cabanatuan, Philippines.

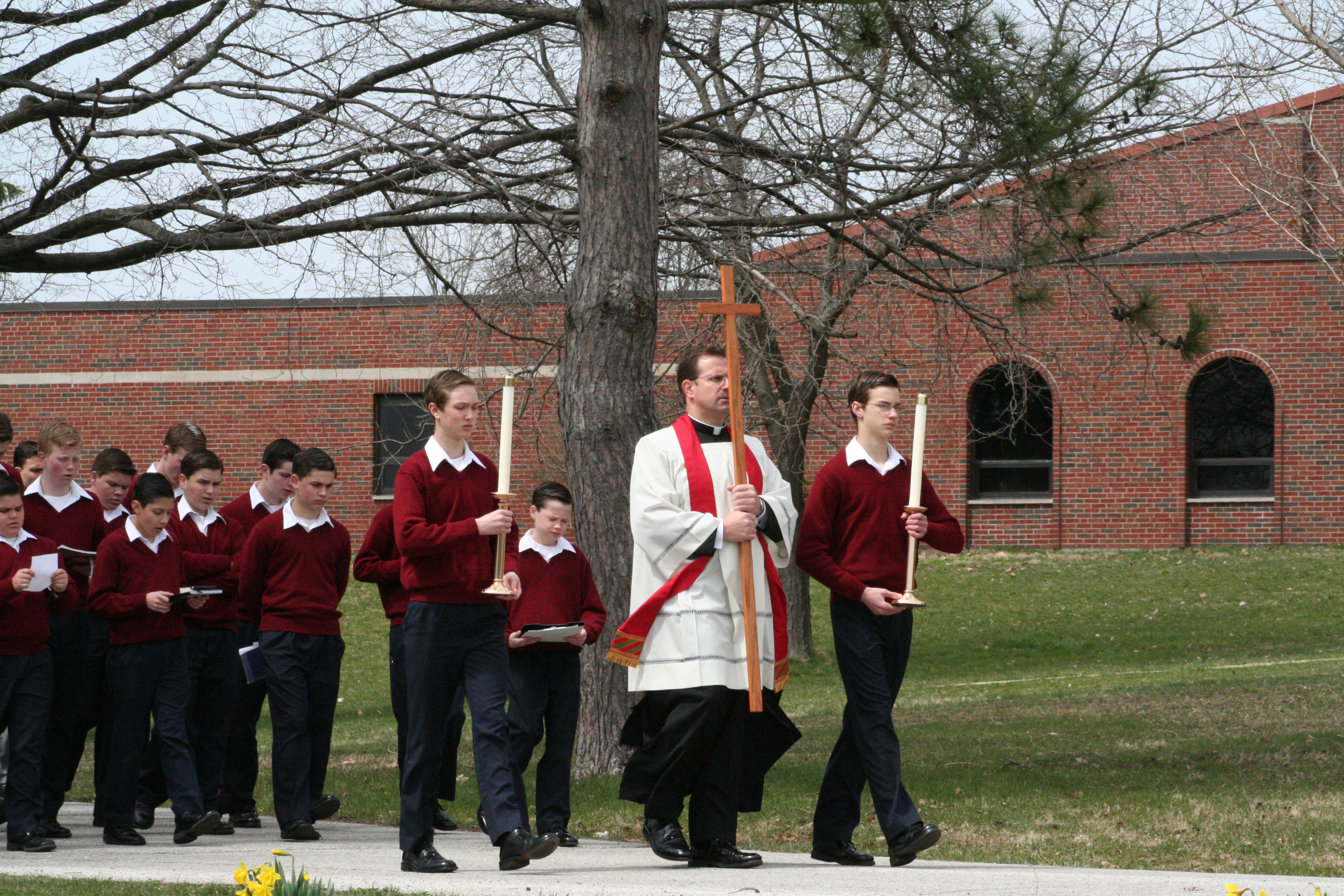
The students at Sacred Heart Apostolic School praying the Stations of the Cross on Good Friday, 2009

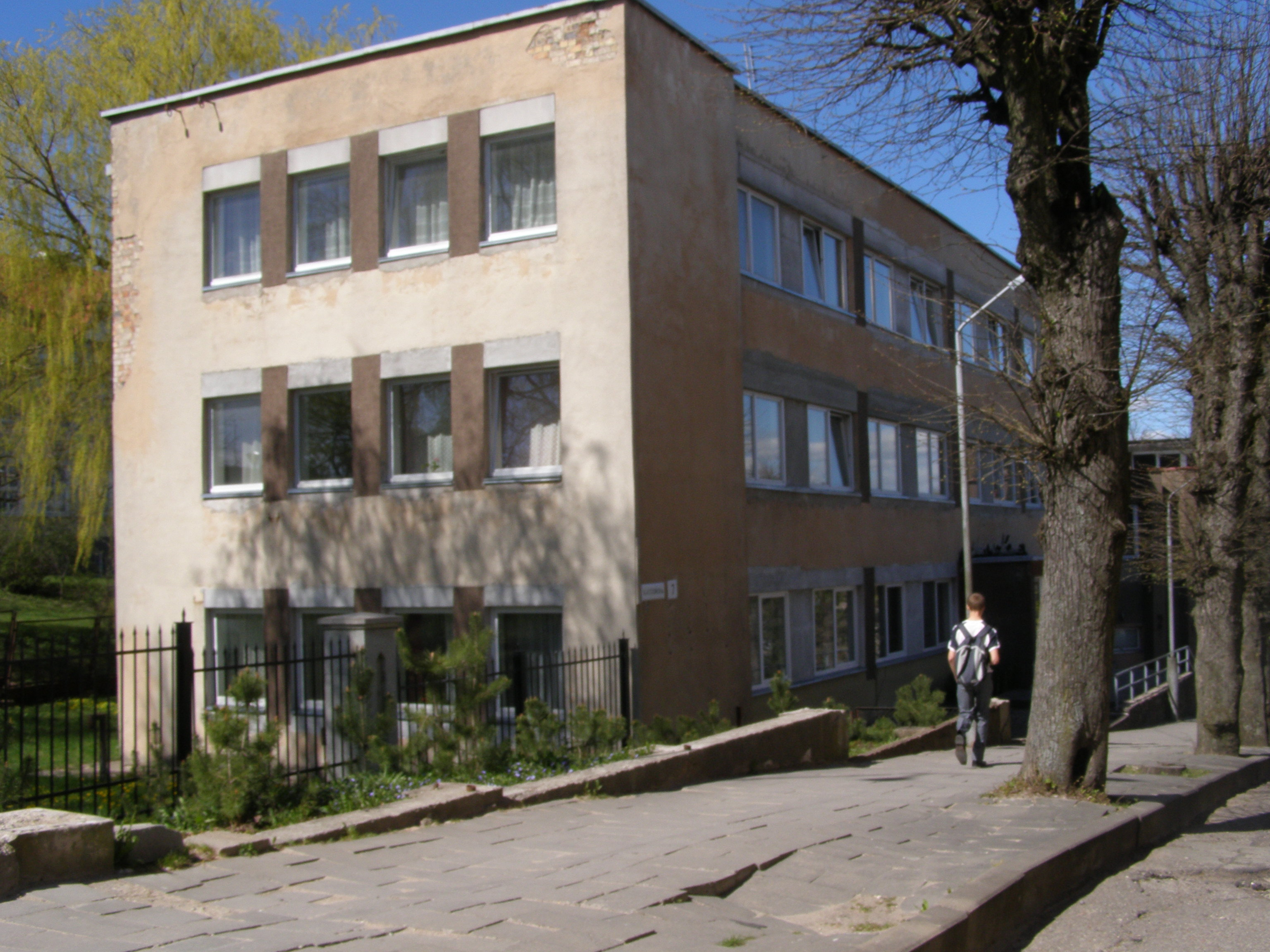
Telšiai Diocese Minor seminary in Lithuania

A minor seminary or high school seminary is a secondary day or boarding school created for the specific purpose of enrolling teenage boys who have expressed interest in becoming Catholic priests. They are generally Catholic institutions, and designed to prepare boys both academically and spiritually for a vocation to the priesthood and religious life. They emerged in cultures and societies where literacy was not universal, and the minor seminary was seen as a means to prepare younger boys in literacy for later entry into the major seminary.

The minor seminary is no longer very familiar in the developed world. The program of priestly formation of the USCCB refers to them as "high school seminaries" rather than minor seminaries.

Today, college seminaries, where philosophy is studied, are often called minor seminaries even though they are for those who have completed high school.

== History ==
The 1917 Code of Canon Law described the purpose of minor seminaries as "to take care especially to protect from the contagion of the world, to train in piety, to imbue with the rudiments of literary studies, and to foster in them the seed of a divine vocation". Suitable boys were encouraged to graduate to a major seminary, where they would continue their studies for the priesthood.

The Second Vatican Council ruled in 1965 that minor seminaries, "erected to develop the seeds of vocations", should be places where students would be "prepared by special religious formation, particularly through appropriate spiritual direction, to follow Christ the Redeemer...", noting that some students would go on to train as priests but that others would "choose a different state of life" and that studies should be organised in a way that would enable such students to continue their education elsewhere. Also important for minor seminarians were understanding of child and adolescent development, contact with their family, and appropriate "social and cultural contacts".

== Extant minor seminaries ==
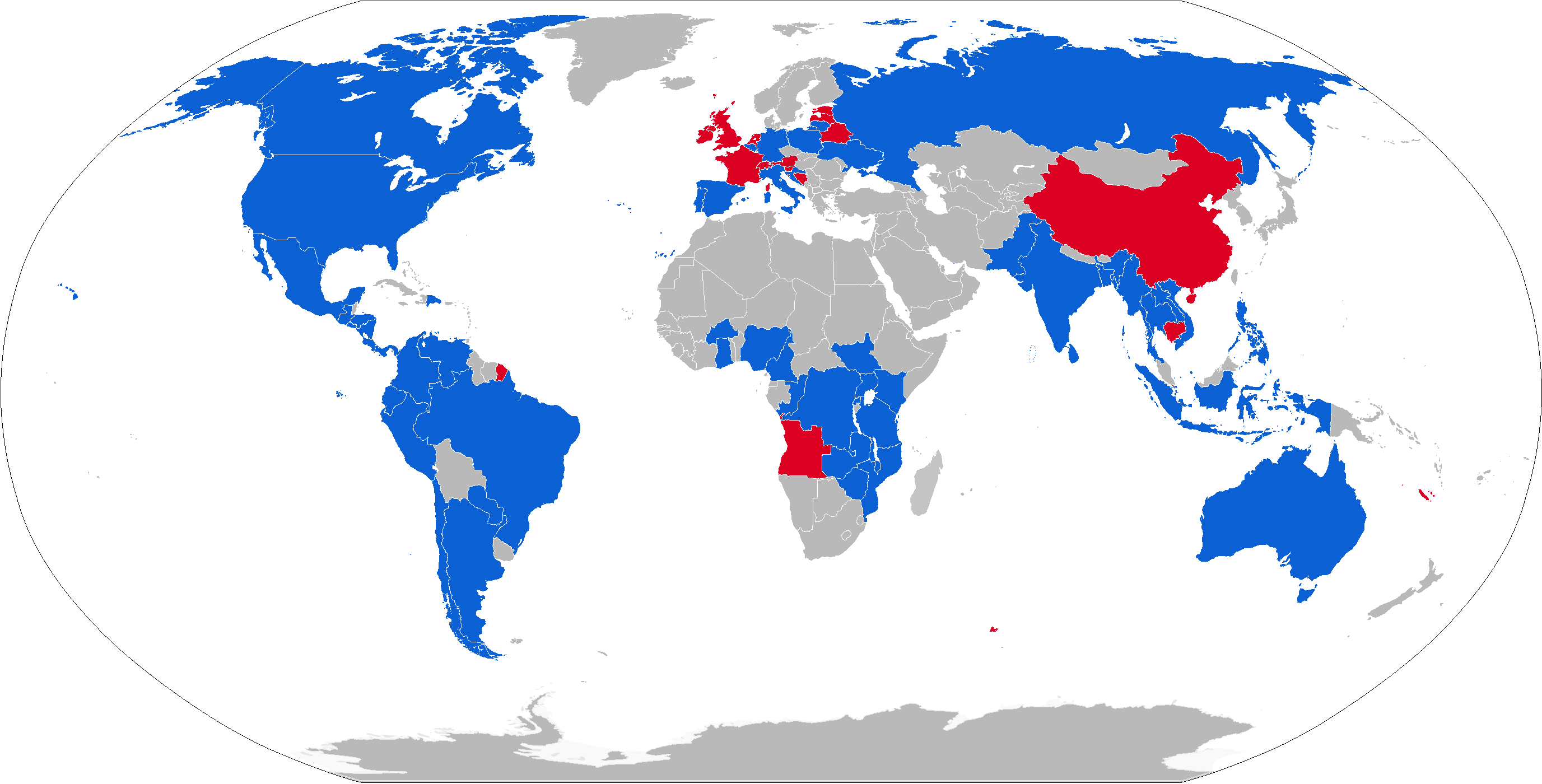
Countries with Minor Seminaries (blue) and have existed in the past (red)

=== Canada ===
- Seminary of Christ the King, Mission, British Columbia

=== East Timor ===
- Seminary of Our Lady of Fatima, Dili
- St. Joseph Seminary, Maliana

=== Ghana ===
- St Teresa's Minor Seminary

=== India ===
- St.Joseph Minor Seminary, Kalamassery – Archdiocese of Verapoly, Kerala.
- St. Aloysius Seminary, Trivandrum – Syro-Malankara Archeparchy of Trivandrum
- St. Agnes Minor Seminary, Cuddalore, Tamil Nadu
- Sacred Heart Minor Seminary, Thrikkakara, Kochi, Kerala - Archeparchy of Ernakulam- Angamaly
- Good Shepherd Minor Seminary, Pala, India
- St Paul's Minor Seminary, Akalpur, Jammu

=== Indonesia ===
- Minor seminary of Saint Paul Palembang
- Peter Canisius Minor Seminary Mertoyudan
- Wacana Bhakti Minor Seminary

=== Nigeria ===
- St. Theresa's Minor Seminary, Oke-Are, Ibadan
- Sacred Heart Minor Seminary, Akure
- All Hallows Seminary, Onitsha

=== Pakistan ===
- St. Mary's Minor Seminary, Lahore
- Our Lady of Lourdes Minor Seminary, Islamabad–Rawalpindi, founded in 1995
- St. Pius X Minor Seminary – Karachi, founded in 1958
- St. Thomas the Apostle Minor Seminary, Faisalabad, founded in 1981
- St. Bonaventure's Minor Seminary, Mirpurkhas, founded in 2022

=== Philippines ===
- Mother of Good Counsel Minor Seminary City of San Fernando, Pampanga
- St. Augustine Minor Seminary – minor seminary of Iba, Zambales, Luzon covering Olongapo City and Zambales Province
- San Jacinto Seminary (Penablanca, Cagayan) – Archdiocese of Tuguegarao
- Diocesan Seminary of the Heart of Jesus (San Fernando La Union)
- Immaculate Conception Minor Seminary (Vigan, Ilocos Sur)
- St. Mary's Seminary (Laoag, Ilocos Norte)
- Immaculate Conception Minor Seminary (Guiguinto, Bulacan) – Diocese of Malolos
- John Paul II Minor Seminary (Antipolo, Rizal) – high school seminary of the Diocese of Antipolo
- Oblates of St. Joseph Minor Seminary (San Jose, Batangas) – high school seminary
- Our Lady of Guadalupe Minor Seminary (Makati) – high school seminary of the Archdiocese of Manila
- Our Lady of Mount Carmel Seminary (Sariaya, Quezon) – Diocese of Lucena
- Pope John XXIII Seminary (Cebu City) – Archdiocese of Cebu
- Pope Paul VI Minor Seminary (Maasin City, Southern Leyte)
- Saint Francis de Sales Minor Seminary (Lipa City, Batangas) – minor (high school) seminary of the Archdiocese of Lipa
- Holy Rosary Minor Seminary (Naga City, Camarines Sur) Archdiocese of Caceres
- St. Gregory the Great Seminary (Panal, Tabaco City) – Diocese of Legazpi
- Our Lady of Peñafrancia Seminary Sorsogon City) - Diocese of Sorsogon
- St. Anthony High School Seminary (Kinamaligan, Masbate City) Under the supervision of the Diocese of Masbate
- Sto. Nino Seminary (Numancia, Aklan) – minor and college
- St. Pius X Seminary (Lawaan, Roxas City, Capiz) – Archdiocese of Capiz
- Saint Vincent Ferrer Seminary – (Jaro, Iloilo City) – Archdiocese of Jaro
- Seminario de San Jose (Puerto Princesa City, Palawan) – minor and major seminary
- Seminario de Jesús Nazareno (Borongan City, Eastern Samar) – Diocese of Borongan

=== Poland ===
- Minor Seminary in Częstochowa – high school seminary of the Archdiocese of Częstochowa
- Minor Seminary of the Diocese of Płock – Diocese of Płock

=== Romania ===
- Minor Seminary in Bacau - high school seminary of the Diocese of Iasi

=== United States ===
- Blessed Jose Sanchez del Rio Minor Seminary (Mankato, Minnesota), high school seminary run by the Institute of the Incarnate Word; opened in 2008.
- Sacred Heart Apostolic School (Rolling Prairie, Indiana) run by the Legionaries of Christ, opened in 2005
- St. Lawrence High School Seminary (Mount Calvary, Wisconsin) run by the Capuchin Friars, opened in 1860
- St. Joseph Seminary (Rathdrum, Idaho) - Sedevacantist (CRMI)

=== Uganda ===
- Bukalasa Minor Seminary
- Christ the King Seminary, Kisubi,
- St. Joseph's Seminary, Nyenga
- Mubende Seminary – in Nandele and Nyenga
- Nadiket seminary – for the dioceses of Kotido and Moroto
- Saint Charles seminary
- Saints Joseph's and Gabriel's Junior Seminary Nswanjere – located in Nswanjere, Mpigi District.
- St. Pius X Seminary – Nagongera – Located in Tororo district; West Budama County; Junior and Minor Seminary
- St. Paul's Seminary – Rushoroza – in Kabale for Kabale Diocese
- Kitabi Seminary in Bushenyi for Mbarara Archdiocese
- Sacred Heart Mission for the Brothers of Divine Mercy; Missionary preparation
- Sacred Heart Seminary Lacor – Gulu archdiocese
- St Peter's Seminary-Madera) – in Soroti for Soroti Diocese

=== Vietnam ===
- Sacred Heart Seminary of Thai Binh – Minor Seminary of the Diocese of Thái Bình
- Saint Nicolas Seminary of Phan Thiet – Minor Seminary of the Diocese of Phan Thiết
