= Barwinek =

Barwinek may refer to the following locations in Poland:

- Barwinek, Łódź Voivodeship, village in Łódź Voivodeship
- Barwinek, Podkarpackie Voivodeship, village in Podkarpackie Voivodeship
