= St. Paul Seminary =

St. Paul Seminary may refer to:

- St. Paul Seminary School of Divinity in Saint Paul, Minnesota
- Saint Paul Seminary (Pittsburgh), Pennsylvania
- Saint Paul Seminary (Saginaw) in Saginaw, Michigan (closed in 1970)
- Minor seminary of Saint Paul Palembang, Indonesia

== See also ==
- List of Roman Catholic seminaries
