= Konradów =

Konradów may refer to the following places in Poland:

- Konradów, Greater Poland Voivodeship (west-central Poland)
- Konradów, Łódź Voivodeship (central Poland)
- Konradów, Lower Silesian Voivodeship (south-west Poland)
- Konradów, Lublin Voivodeship (east Poland)
- Konradów, Silesian Voivodeship (south Poland)
- Konradów, Opole Voivodeship (south-west Poland)
- Konradów, city district of Wałbrzych, Wałbrzych County in Lower Silesia
