= Widawka, Łódź Voivodeship =

Widawka
- Village
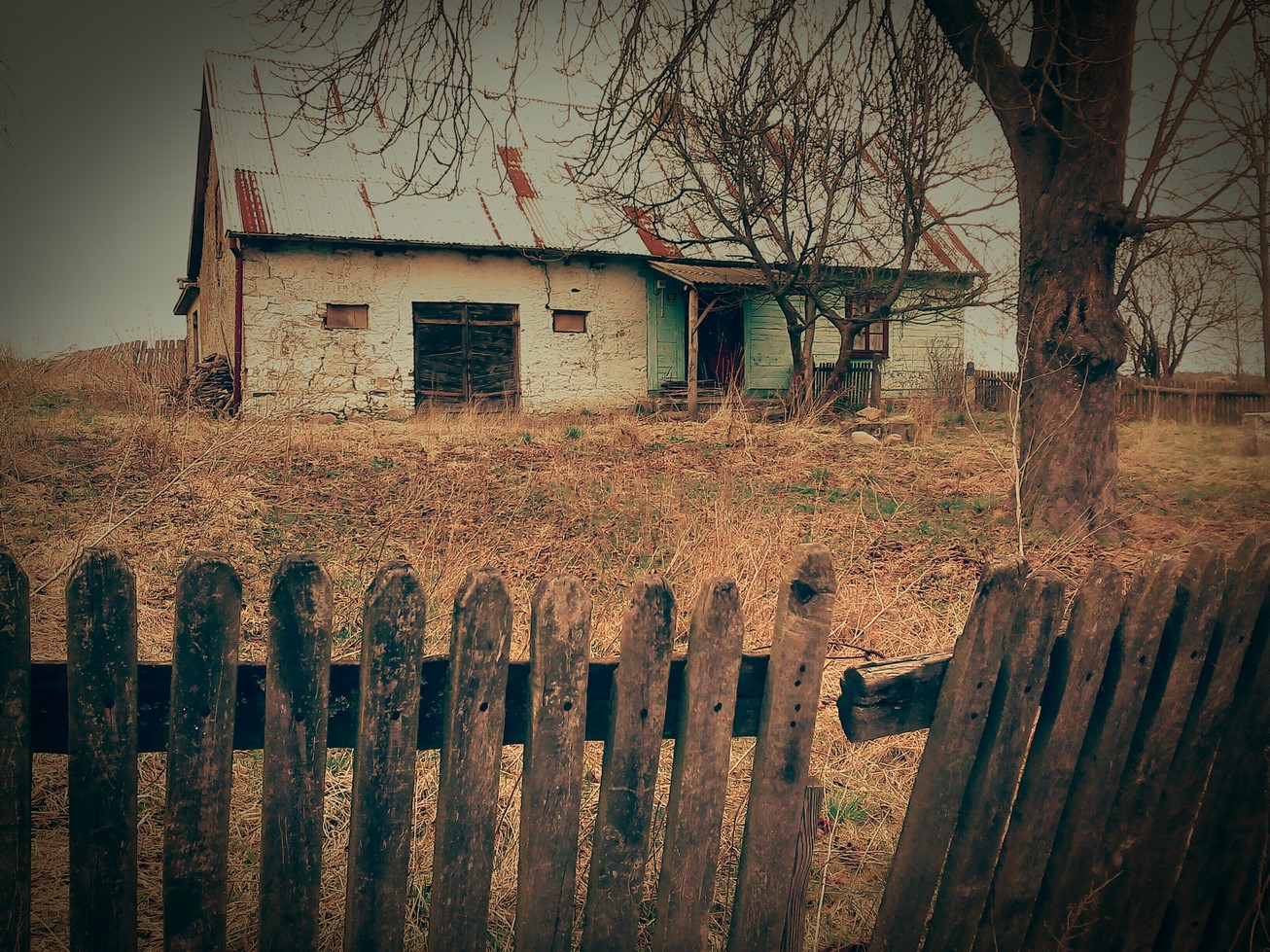

- Location within Poland
- Coordinates: 51°7′N 19°36′E
- Country: Poland
- Voivodeship: Łódź
- County: Radomsko
- Gmina: Kodrąb

Widawka [viˈdafka] is a village in the administrative district of Gmina Kodrąb, within Radomsko County, Łódź Voivodeship, in central Poland.
