= Rzejowice =

- Village
- Location within Poland
- Coordinates: 51°6′N 19°42′E
- Country: Poland
- Voivodeship: Łódź
- County: Radomsko
- Gmina: Kodrąb

Rzejowice [ʐɛjɔˈvit͡sɛ] is a village in the administrative district of Gmina Kodrąb, within Radomsko County, Łódź Voivodeship, in central Poland.
