= Gosławice, Radomsko County =

Gosławice
- Village
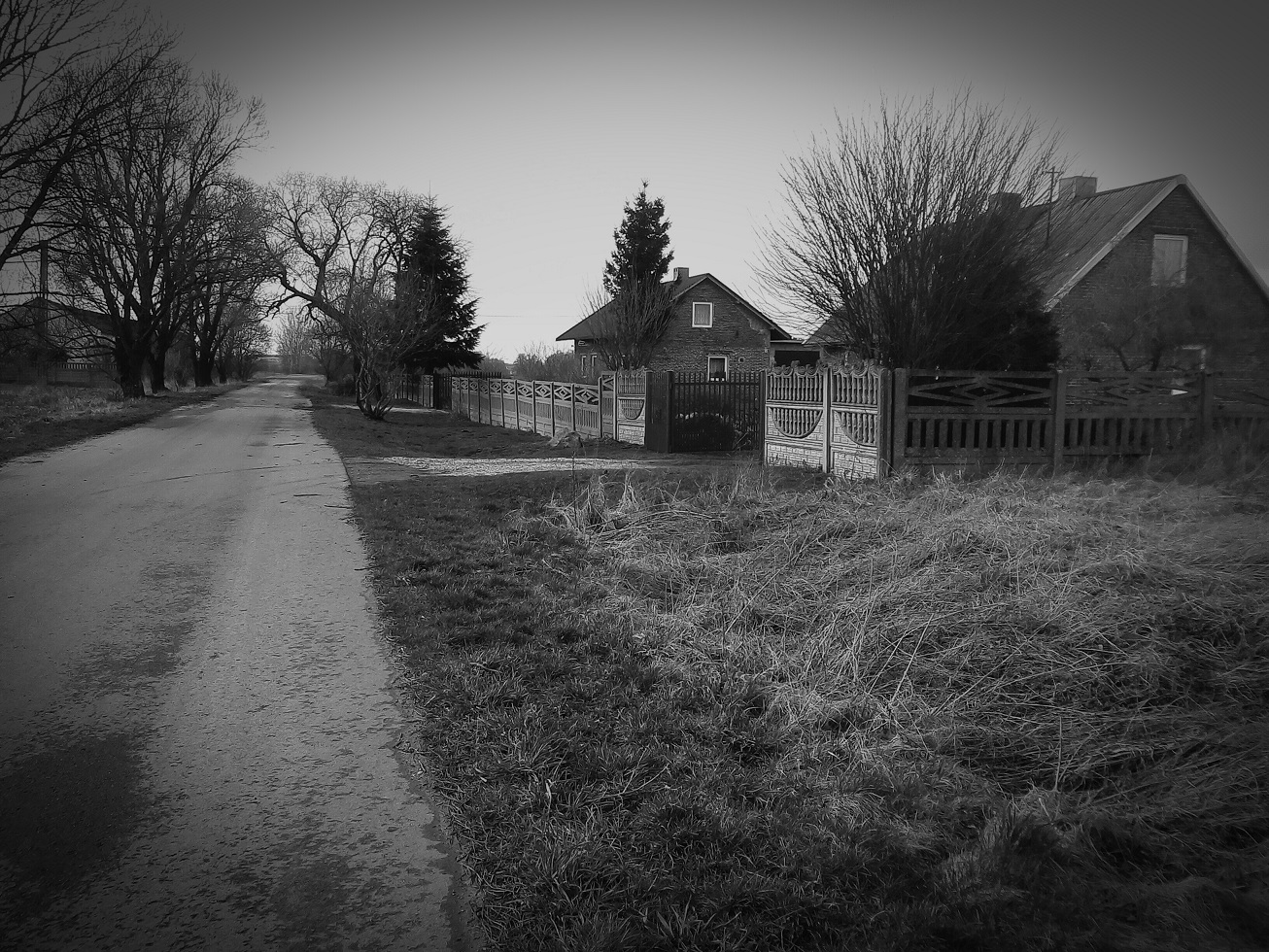

- Location within Poland
- Coordinates: 51°6′30″N 19°33′36″E
- Country: Poland
- Voivodeship: Łódź
- County: Radomsko
- Gmina: Kodrąb

Gosławice [ɡɔswaˈvit͡sɛ] is a village in the administrative district of Gmina Kodrąb, within Radomsko County, Łódź Voivodeship, in central Poland.
