= Zabłocie, Radomsko County =

Zabłocie
- Settlement
- Location within Poland
- Coordinates: 51°6′20″N 19°34′27″E
- Country: Poland
- Voivodeship: Łódź
- County: Radomsko
- Gmina: Kodrąb

Zabłocie [zaˈbwɔt͡ɕɛ] is a settlement in the administrative district of Gmina Kodrąb, within Radomsko County, Łódź Voivodeship, in central Poland.
