= Klizin-Brzezinki =

- Settlement
- Location within Poland
- Coordinates: 51°07′58″N 19°36′27″E
- Country: Poland
- Voivodeship: Łódź
- County: Radomsko
- Gmina: Kodrąb

Klizin-Brzezinki [ˈkliʑin bʐɛˈʑinki] is a settlement in the administrative district of Gmina Kodrąb, within Radomsko County, Łódź Voivodeship, in central Poland.
