= Rogaszyn, Radomsko County =

Rogaszyn
- Settlement
- Location within Poland
- Coordinates: 51°05′29″N 19°35′56″E
- Country: Poland
- Voivodeship: Łódź
- County: Radomsko
- Gmina: Kodrąb

Rogaszyn [rɔˈɡaʂɨn] is a settlement in the administrative district of Gmina Kodrąb, within Radomsko County, Łódź Voivodeship, in central Poland.
