= Klizin =

- Village
- Location within Poland
- Coordinates: 51°8′9″N 19°37′5″E
- Country: Poland
- Voivodeship: Łódź
- County: Radomsko
- Gmina: Kodrąb

Klizin [ˈkliʑin] is a village in the administrative district of Gmina Kodrąb, within Radomsko County, Łódź Voivodeship, in central Poland.
