= Młyńczysko =

- Settlement
- Location within Poland
- Coordinates: 51°5′43″N 19°39′30″E
- Country: Poland
- Voivodeship: Łódź
- County: Radomsko
- Gmina: Kodrąb

Młyńczysko [mwɨɲˈt͡ʂɨskɔ] is a settlement in the administrative district of Gmina Kodrąb, within Radomsko County, Łódź Voivodeship, in central Poland.
