= Moczydła, Radomsko County =

Moczydła
- Settlement
- Location within Poland
- Coordinates: 51°6′3″N 19°35′54″E
- Country: Poland
- Voivodeship: Łódź
- County: Radomsko
- Gmina: Kodrąb

Moczydła [mɔˈt͡ʂɨdwa] is a settlement in the administrative district of Gmina Kodrąb, within Radomsko County, Łódź Voivodeship, in central Poland.
