= Stefania, Łódź Voivodeship =

Stefania
- Settlement
- Location within Poland
- Coordinates: 51°3′52″N 19°36′35″E
- Country: Poland
- Voivodeship: Łódź
- County: Radomsko
- Gmina: Kodrąb

Stefania [stɛˈfaɲa] is a settlement in the administrative district of Gmina Kodrąb, within Radomsko County, Łódź Voivodeship, in central Poland.
