= Teodorów Duży =

- Village
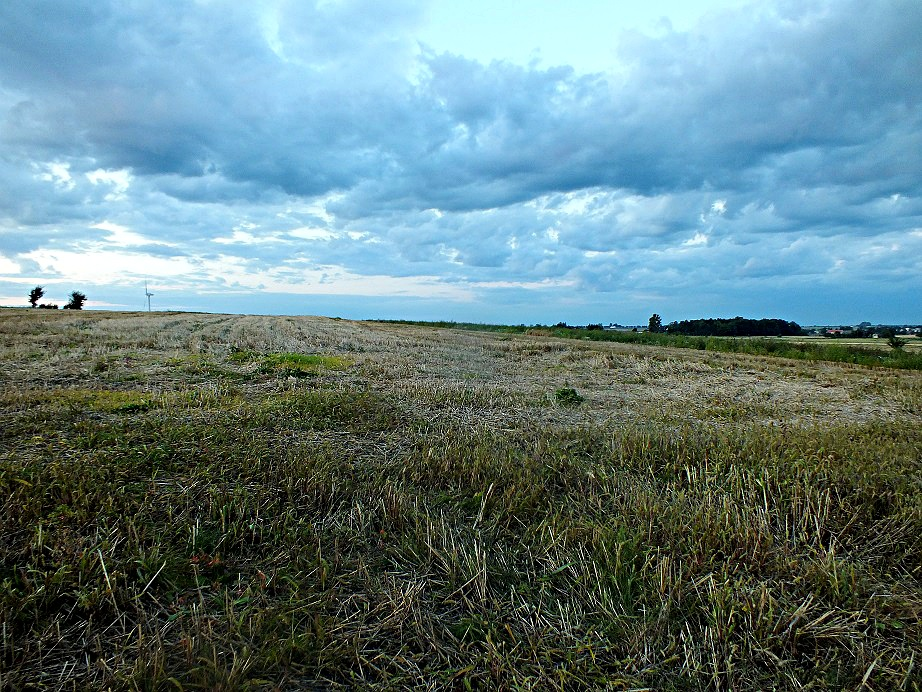

- Location within Poland
- Coordinates: 51°3′31″N 19°36′0″E
- Country: Poland
- Voivodeship: Łódź
- County: Radomsko
- Gmina: Kodrąb
- Population: 100

Teodorów Duży [tɛɔˈdɔruf ˈduʐɨ] is a village in the administrative district of Gmina Kodrąb, within Radomsko County, Łódź Voivodeship, in central Poland.
