= Bugaj Zakrzewski =

- Settlement
- Location within Poland
- Coordinates: 51°05′14.69″N 19°33′4.3″E
- Country: Poland
- Voivodeship: Łódź
- County: Radomsko
- Gmina: Kodrąb

Bugaj Zakrzewski [ˈbuɡai̯ zaˈkʂɛfski] is a settlement in the administrative district of Gmina Kodrąb, within Radomsko County, Łódź Voivodeship, in central Poland.
