= Bugaj Dmeniński =

- Village
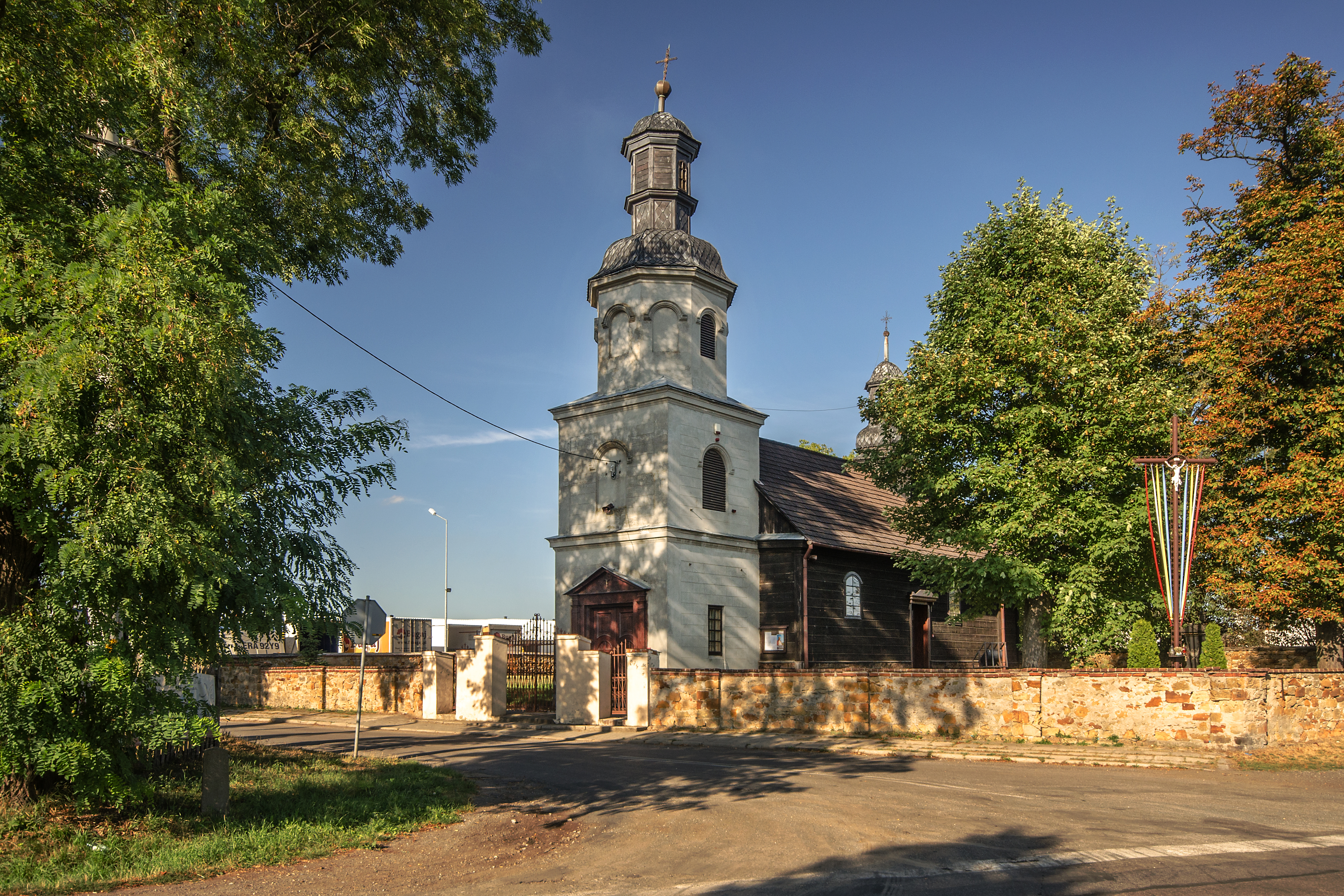
- Catholic church

- Location within Poland
- Coordinates: 51°4′53″N 19°33′22″E
- Country: Poland
- Voivodeship: Łódź
- County: Radomsko
- Gmina: Kodrąb
- Population: 90

Bugaj Dmeniński [ˈbuɡai̯ dmɛˈniɲski] is a village in the administrative district of Gmina Kodrąb, within Radomsko County, Łódź Voivodeship, in central Poland.
