= Dmenin-Władysławów =

- Settlement
- Location within Poland
- Coordinates: 51°02′52″N 19°34′29″E
- Country: Poland
- Voivodeship: Łódź
- County: Radomsko
- Gmina: Kodrąb

Dmenin-Władysławów [ˈdmɛnin vwadɨˈswavuf] is a settlement in the administrative district of Gmina Kodrąb, within Radomsko County, Łódź Voivodeship, in central Poland.
