= Gmina Kodrąb =

Gmina Kodrąb Kodrąb Commune
- Gmina

- Flag Coat of arms
- Interactive map of Gmina Kodrąb
- Coordinates (Kodrąb): 51°5′54″N 19°37′43″E
- Country: Poland
- Voivodeship: Łódź
- County: Radomsko
- Seat: Kodrąb

Area
  - Total: 105.79 km^{2} (40.85 sq mi)

Population (2006)
  - Total: 4,732
  - Density: 44.73/km^{2} (115.9/sq mi)
- Time zone: UTC+1 (CET)
  - Summer (DST): UTC+2 (CEST)
- Website: www.kodrab.hg.pl

Gmina Kodrąb is a rural gmina (administrative district) in Radomsko County, Łódź Voivodeship, in central Poland. Its seat is the village of Kodrąb, which lies approximately 13 kilometres (8 mi) east of Radomsko and 77 km (48 mi) south of the regional capital Łódź.

The gmina covers an area of 105.79 square kilometres (40.8 sq mi), and as of 2006 its total population is 4,732.

== Villages ==
Gmina Kodrąb contains the villages and settlements of:

- Antoniów
- Antopol
- Barwinek
- Bugaj Dmeniński
- Bugaj Zakrzewski
- Dmenin
- Dmenin-Józefka
- Dmenin-Władysławów
- Feliksów
- Florentynów
- Frachowiec
- Gembartówka
- Gosławice
- Hamborowa
- Józefów
- Klizin
- Klizin-Brzezinki
- Klizin-Chaba
- Klizin-Kopaliny
- Kodrąb
- Kolonia Rzejowice
- Konradów
- Kuchary
- Kuźnica
- Łagiewniki
- Lipowczyce
- Młyńczysko
- Moczydła
- Olszowiec
- Przydatki Dmenińskie
- Rogaszyn
- Rzejowice
- Smotryszów
- Stefania
- Teodorów Duży
- Teodorów Mały
- Widawka
- Wola Malowana
- Wólka Pytowska
- Zabłocie
- Zakrzew
- Zakrzew-Czekaj
- Zalesie
- Zapolice
- Żencin

== Neighbouring gminas ==
Gmina Kodrąb is bordered by the town of Radomsko and by the gminas of Gomunice, Gorzkowice, Kobiele Wielkie, Masłowice and Radomsko.
