= Wola Malowana =

- Village
- Location within Poland
- Coordinates: 51°4′N 19°38′E
- Country: Poland
- Voivodeship: Łódź
- County: Radomsko
- Gmina: Kodrąb

Wola Malowana [ˈvɔla malɔˈvana] is a village in the administrative district of Gmina Kodrąb, within Radomsko County, Łódź Voivodeship, in central Poland.
