= Łagiewniki, Radomsko County =

Łagiewniki
- Village
- Location within Poland
- Coordinates: 51°5′1″N 19°34′6″E
- Country: Poland
- Voivodeship: Łódź
- County: Radomsko
- Gmina: Kodrąb
- Population (approx.): 100

Łagiewniki [waɡʲɛvˈniki] is a village in the administrative district of Gmina Kodrąb, within Radomsko County, Łódź Voivodeship, in central Poland.

The village has an approximate population of 100.
