= Antoniów, Radomsko County =

Antoniów
- Settlement
- Location within Poland
- Coordinates: 51°8′N 19°35′E
- Country: Poland
- Voivodeship: Łódź
- County: Radomsko
- Gmina: Kodrąb

Antoniów [anˈtɔɲuf] is a settlement in the administrative district of Gmina Kodrąb, within Radomsko County, Łódź Voivodeship, in central Poland.
