= Feliksów, Radomsko County =

Feliksów
- Village
- Location within Poland
- Coordinates: 51°4′29″N 19°39′15″E
- Country: Poland
- Voivodeship: Łódź
- County: Radomsko
- Gmina: Kodrąb

Feliksów (Polish pronunciation: [fɛˈliksuf]) is a village in the administrative district of Gmina Kodrąb, within Radomsko County, Łódź Voivodeship, in central Poland.
