= Gembartówka =

- Village
- Location within Poland
- Coordinates: 51°06′03″N 19°40′51″E
- Country: Poland
- Voivodeship: Łódź
- County: Radomsko
- Gmina: Kodrąb

Gembartówka [ɡɛmbarˈtufka] is a village in the administrative district of Gmina Kodrąb, within Radomsko County, Łódź Voivodeship, in central Poland.
