= Zdzisław Goliński =

Polish Roman Catholic bishop (1908–1963)

- Bishop of Częstochowa
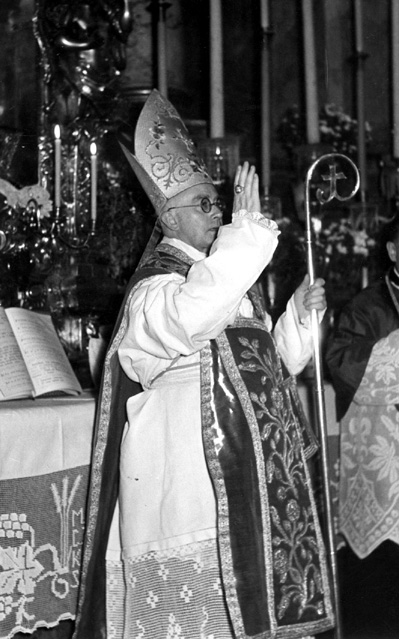
- Bishop Zdzisław Goliński in 1959
- Appointed: 29 May 1951
- Predecessor: Teodor Kubina
- Successor: Stefan Bareła
- Previous posts: Coadjutor bishop of Lublin (1947–1951); Titular bishop of Hemeria (1947–1951)

Orders
- Ordination: 28 June 1931 by Adolf Jełowicki
- Consecration: 3 August 1947 by Stefan Wyszyński

Personal details
- Born: 23 December 1908 Urzędów
- Died: 6 July 1963 (aged 54) Częstochowa

Zdzisław Goliński (23 December 1908 – 6 July 1963) was the Roman Catholic bishop of the Diocese of Częstochowa from 1951 until his death in 1963.

== Biography ==
Goliński was born in Urzędów. After completing his matura from a men's gymnasium at Zamość on 2 June 1926, he began attending the diocesan seminary of the Diocese of Lublin, where he studied philosophy and theology between 1926 and 1930. He was later sent to study moral theology at the Catholic University of Lublin, and was ordained a priest on 28 June 1931 at Lublin Cathedral by Adolf Jełowicki. He obtained a doctorate in theology from the Catholic University of Lublin in June 1933; he would continue his studies at the Pontifical Gregorian University and Pontifical University of Saint Thomas Aquinas in 1933 and 1934.

In September 1934, Goliński began working as a spiritual father for a gymnasium in Lublin and as a senior assistant for the Faculty of Theology at the Catholic University of Lublin. On 9 November 1939, he was arrested by Germans and held at Lublin Castle; he was released on 23 March 1940. After his release, Goliński worked as a procurator and professor at the diocesan seminary of Lublin. He was appointed a titular canon of the cathedral chapter of Lublin in October 1943 and began teaching moral theology at the Catholic University of Lublin in November 1944. He received habilitation on 22 June 1945.

On 21 March 1947, Goliński was appointed by Pope Pius XII as coadjutor bishop of the Diocese of Lublin and titular bishop of Hemeria; he was consecrated on 3 August 1947 at Lublin Cathedral by Stefan Wyszyński. He was co-consecrated by Michał Klepacz and Stanisław Czajka. He was appointed bishop of the Diocese of Częstochowa on 29 May 1951, assuming control of the Diocese on 17 June of the same year. Goliński died on 6 July 1953; he was buried on 9 July 1963 at Częstochowa Cathedral.
