= Wólka Pytowska =

- Settlement
- Location within Poland
- Coordinates: 51°6′35″N 19°37′54″E
- Country: Poland
- Voivodeship: Łódź
- County: Radomsko
- Gmina: Kodrąb
- Population: 15

Wólka Pytowska [ˈvulka pɨˈtɔfska] is a settlement in the administrative district of Gmina Kodrąb, within Radomsko County, Łódź Voivodeship, in central Poland.
