= Żencin =

- Village
- Location within Poland
- Coordinates: 51°8′50″N 19°39′46″E
- Country: Poland
- Voivodeship: Łódź
- County: Radomsko
- Gmina: Kodrąb

Żencin [ˈʐɛnt͡ɕin] is a village in the administrative district of Gmina Kodrąb, within Radomsko County, Łódź Voivodeship, in central Poland.
