= Teodorów Mały =

- Village
- Location within Poland
- Coordinates: 51°4′25″N 19°36′29″E
- Country: Poland
- Voivodeship: Łódź
- County: Radomsko
- Gmina: Kodrąb
- Population: 180

Teodorów Mały [tɛɔˈdɔruf ˈmawɨ] is a village in the administrative district of Gmina Kodrąb, within Radomsko County, Łódź Voivodeship, in central Poland.
