= Kolonia Rzejowice =

- Settlement
- Location within Poland
- Coordinates: 51°5′10″N 19°40′53″E
- Country: Poland
- Voivodeship: Łódź
- County: Radomsko
- Gmina: Kodrąb

Kolonia Rzejowice [kɔˈlɔɲa ʐɛjɔˈvit͡sɛ] is a settlement in the administrative district of Gmina Kodrąb, within Radomsko County, Łódź Voivodeship, in central Poland.
