= Frachowiec =

- Settlement
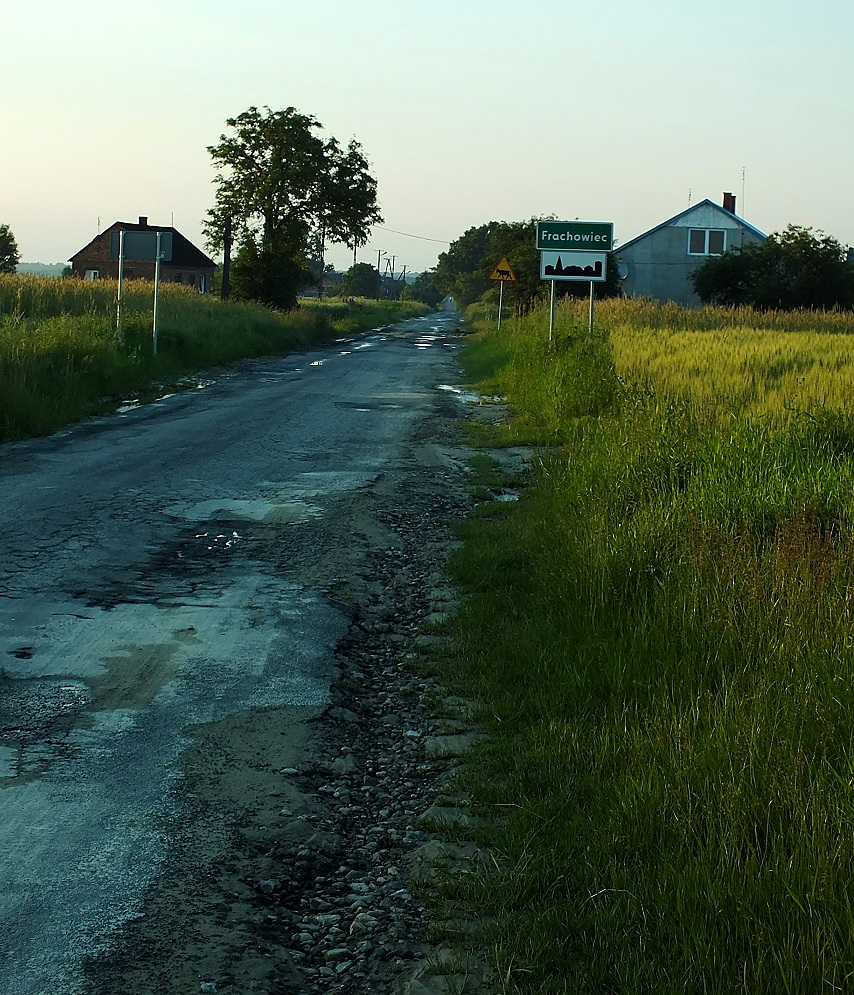

- Location within Poland
- Coordinates: 51°5′53″N 19°33′30″E
- Country: Poland
- Voivodeship: Łódź
- County: Radomsko
- Gmina: Kodrąb

Frachowiec [fraˈxɔvjɛt͡s] is a settlement in the administrative district of Gmina Kodrąb, within Radomsko County, Łódź Voivodeship, in central Poland.
