= Dmenin =

- Village
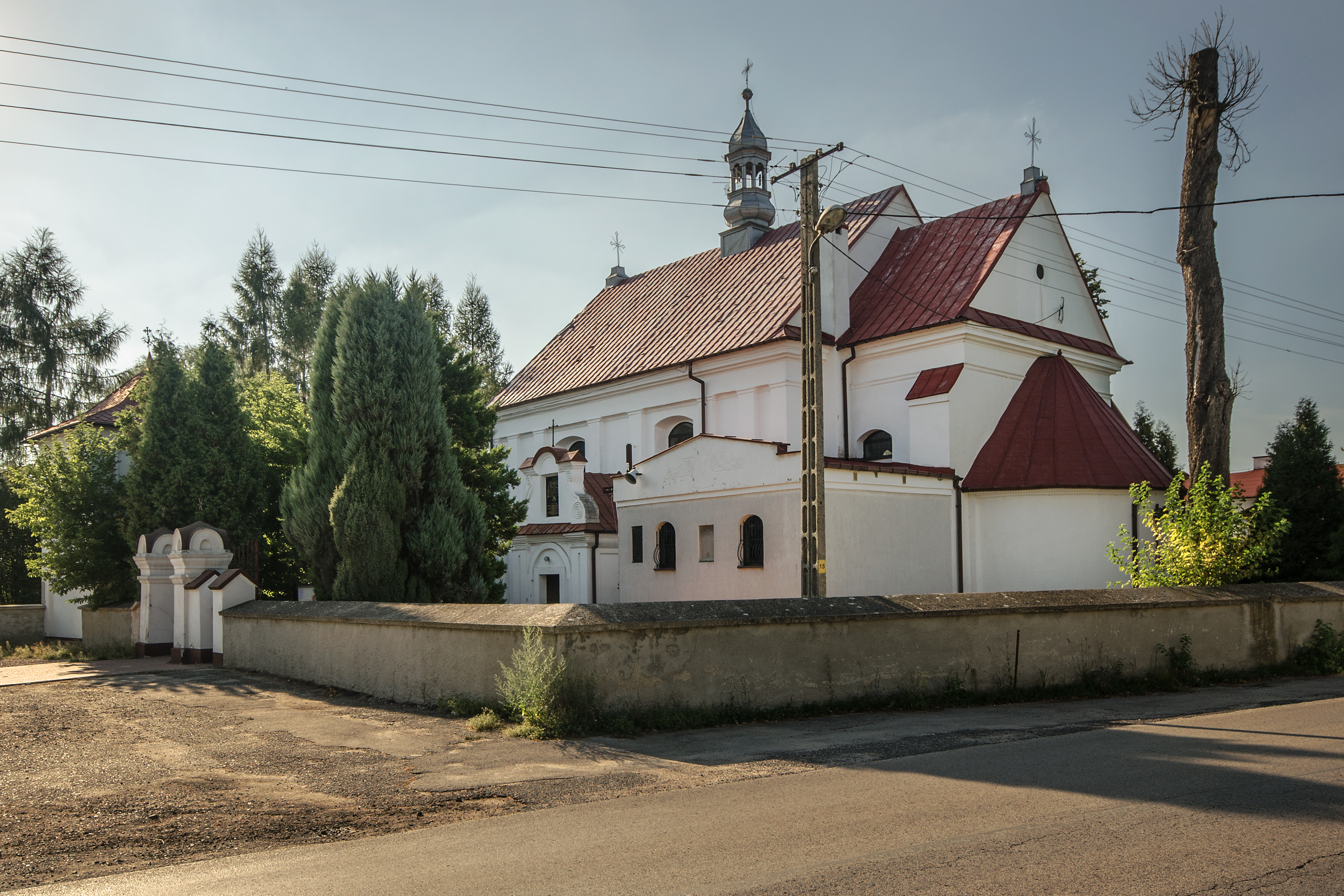
- Catholic church

- Location within Poland
- Coordinates: 51°4′N 19°34′E
- Country: Poland
- Voivodeship: Łódź
- County: Radomsko
- Gmina: Kodrąb
- Population: 600

Dmenin [ˈdmɛnin] is a village in the administrative district of Gmina Kodrąb, within Radomsko County, Łódź Voivodeship, in central Poland.
