= Józefów, Gmina Kodrąb =

Józefów
- Village
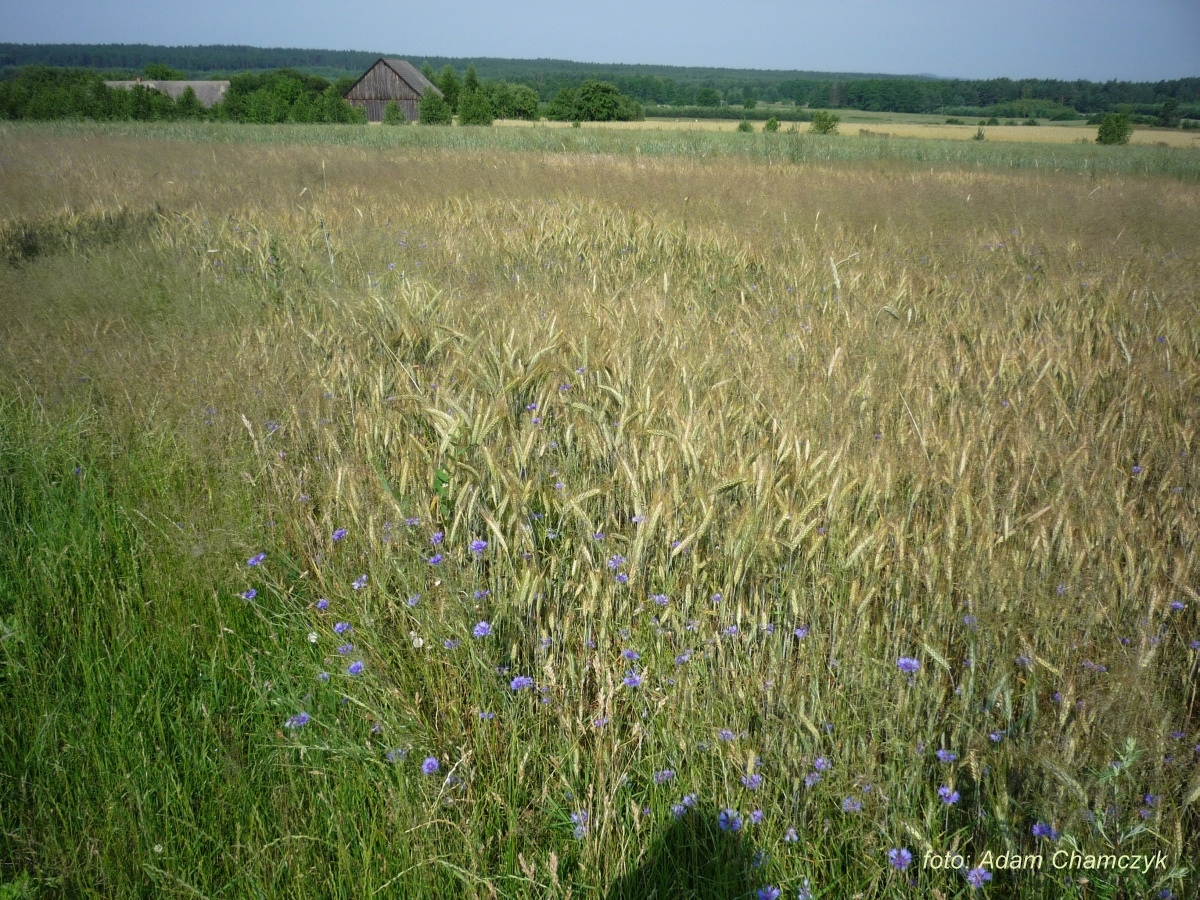

- Location within Poland
- Coordinates: 51°6′10″N 19°39′57″E
- Country: Poland
- Voivodeship: Łódź
- County: Radomsko
- Gmina: Kodrąb

Józefów (Polish pronunciation: [juˈzɛfuf]) is a village in the administrative district of Gmina Kodrąb, within Radomsko County, Łódź Voivodeship, in central Poland.
