= Zalesie, Gmina Kodrąb =

Zalesie
- Village
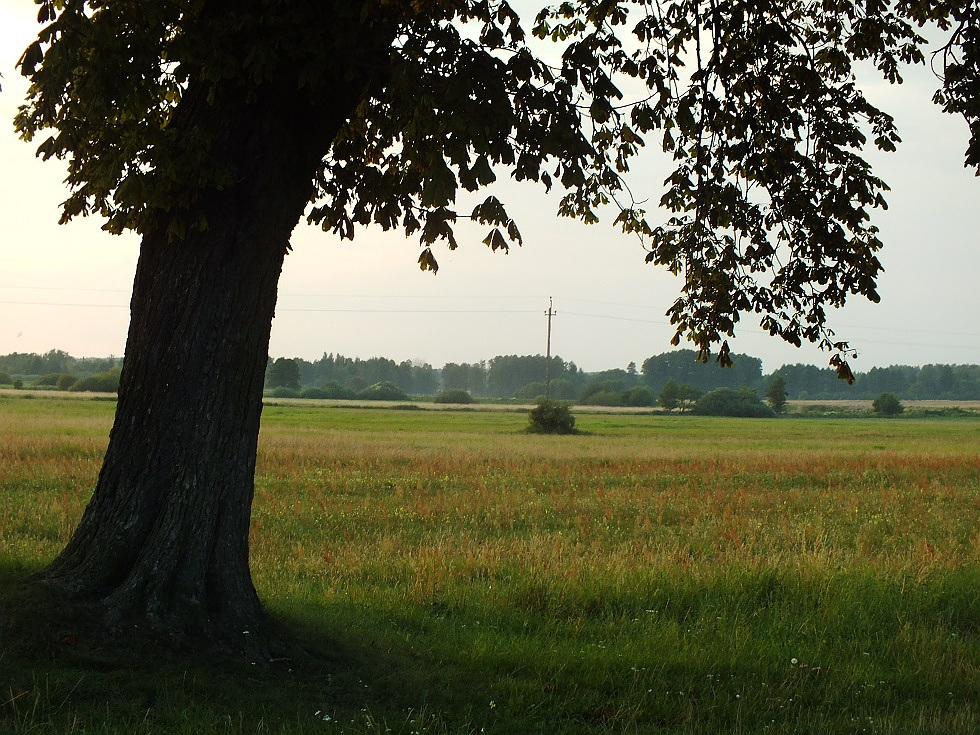

- Location within Poland
- Coordinates: 51°9′12″N 19°39′44″E
- Country: Poland
- Voivodeship: Łódź
- County: Radomsko
- Gmina: Kodrąb
- Population: 40

Zalesie [zaˈlɛɕɛ] is a village in the administrative district of Gmina Kodrąb, within Radomsko County, Łódź Voivodeship, in central Poland.
