= Zakrzew, Radomsko County =

Zakrzew
- Village
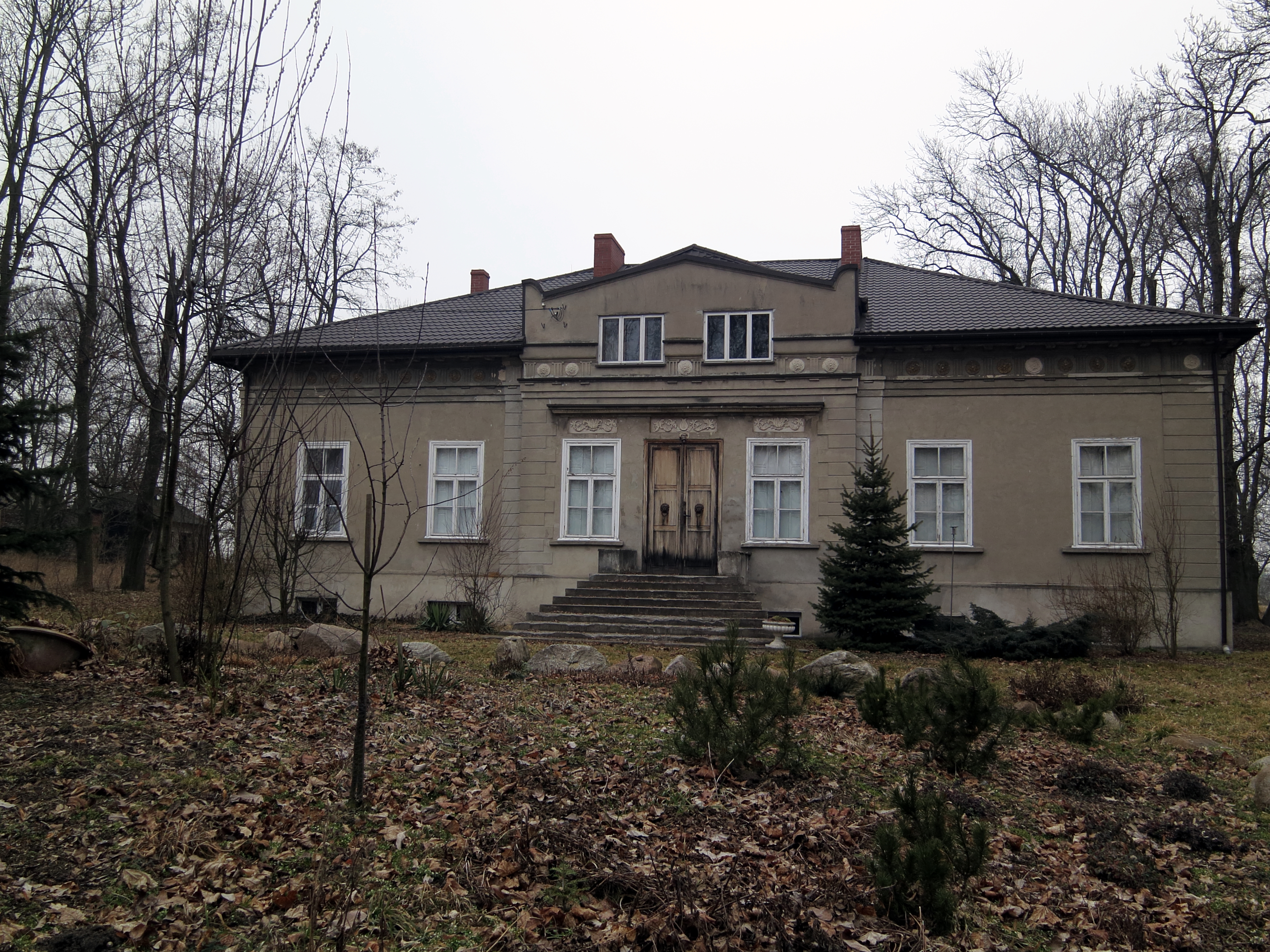
- Manor

- Location within Poland
- Coordinates: 51°5′12″N 19°35′12″E
- Country: Poland
- Voivodeship: Łódź
- County: Radomsko
- Gmina: Kodrąb

Zakrzew [ˈzakʂɛf] is a village in the administrative district of Gmina Kodrąb, within Radomsko County, Łódź Voivodeship, in central Poland.

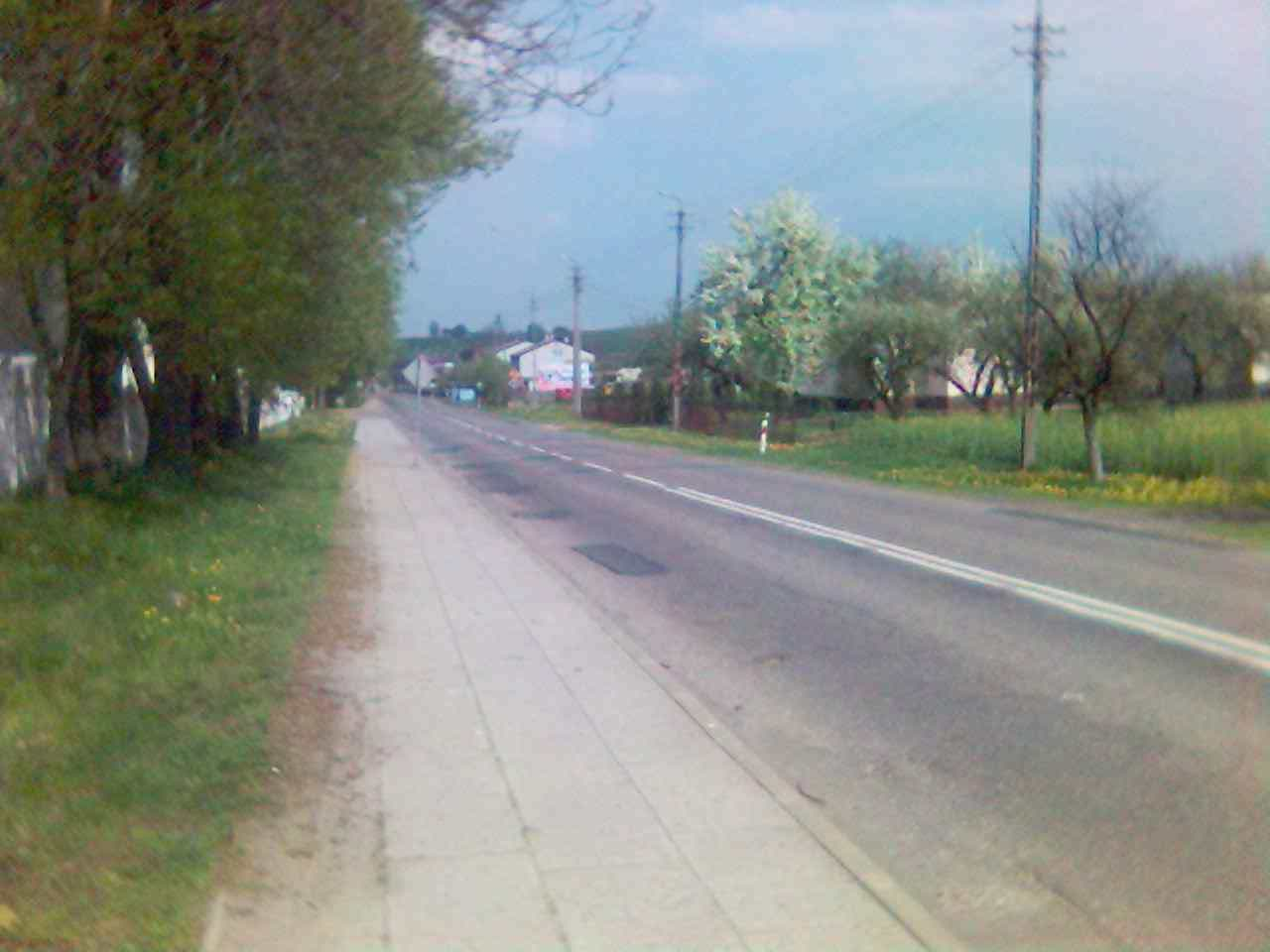
A view of Zakrzew, photographed April 2006
