= Zakrzew-Czekaj =

- Settlement
- Location within Poland
- Coordinates: 51°05′58″N 19°34′54″E
- Country: Poland
- Voivodeship: Łódź
- County: Radomsko
- Gmina: Kodrąb

Zakrzew-Czekaj ([ˈzakʂɛf ˈt͡ʂɛkai̯]) is a settlement in the administrative district of Gmina Kodrąb, within Radomsko County, Łódź Voivodeship, in central Poland.
