= Klizin-Chaba =

- Settlement
- Location within Poland
- Coordinates: 51°08′05″N 19°35′27″E
- Country: Poland
- Voivodeship: Łódź
- County: Radomsko
- Gmina: Kodrąb

Klizin-Chaba [ˈkliʑin ˈxaba] is a settlement in the administrative district of Gmina Kodrąb, within Radomsko County, Łódź Voivodeship, in central Poland.
