= Kuźnica, Radomsko County =

Kuźnica
- Village
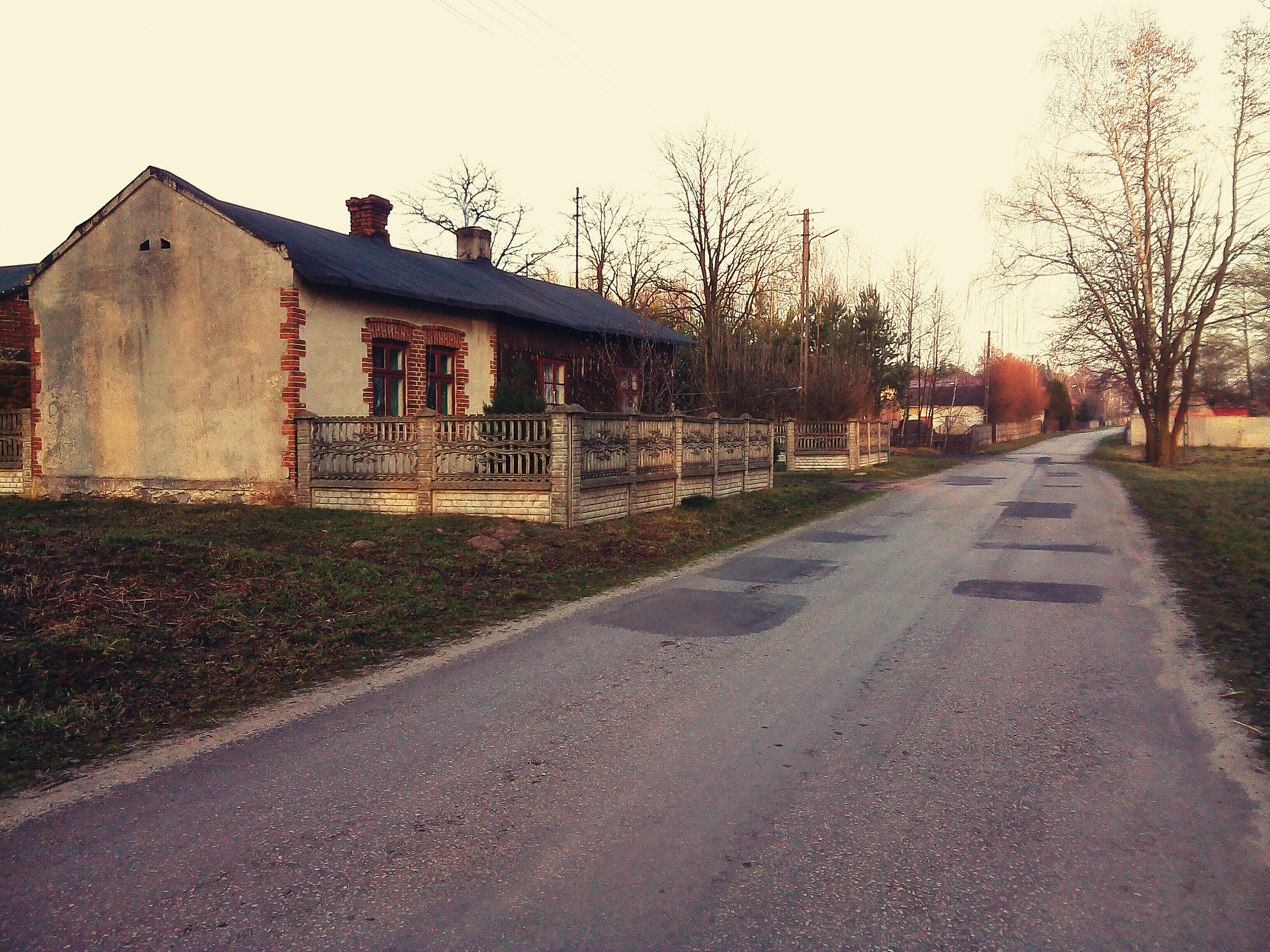

- Location within Poland
- Coordinates: 51°7′N 19°33′E
- Country: Poland
- Voivodeship: Łódź
- County: Radomsko
- Gmina: Kodrąb

Kuźnica (Polish pronunciation: [kuʑˈɲit͡sa]) is a village in the administrative district of Gmina Kodrąb, within Radomsko County, Łódź Voivodeship, in central Poland.
