= Olszowiec, Radomsko County =

Olszowiec
- Settlement
- Location within Poland
- Coordinates: 51°6′27″N 19°37′12″E
- Country: Poland
- Voivodeship: Łódź
- County: Radomsko
- Gmina: Kodrąb

Olszowiec [ɔlˈʂɔvjɛt͡s] is a settlement in the administrative district of Gmina Kodrąb, within Radomsko County, Łódź Voivodeship, in central Poland.
