= Diocese of Rzeszów =

Roman Catholic diocese in Poland

Coordinates: 50°00′47″N 22°01′11″E

Diocese of Rzeszów Dioecesis Rzeszoviensis Diecezja Rzeszowska

Catholic
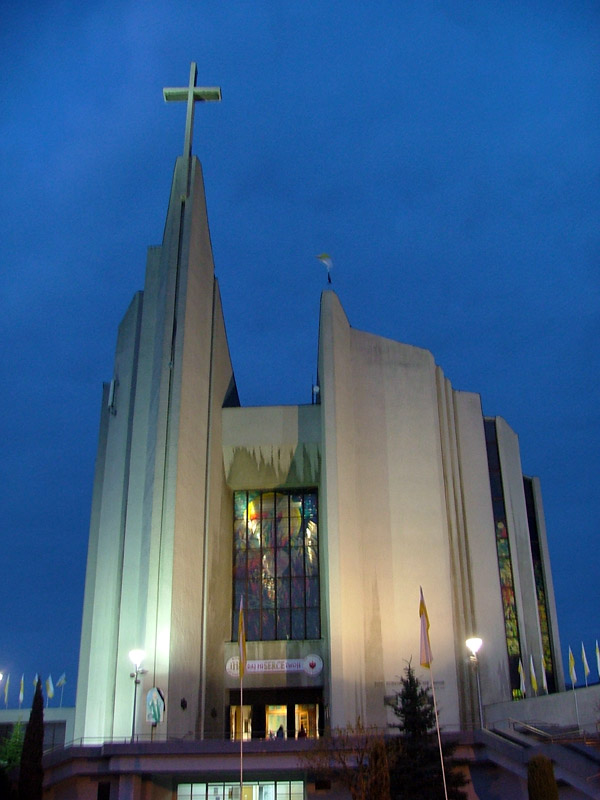
- Cathedral of the Sacred Heart in Rzeszów

Location
- Country: Poland
- Ecclesiastical province: Przemyśl
- Metropolitan: Archdiocese of Przemyśl

Statistics
- Area: 6,000 km^{2} (2,300 sq mi)
- Population: Total; Catholics: (as of 2010); 601,598; 595,946 (98.8%)

Information
- Rite: Latin Rite
- Established: 25 March 1992
- Cathedral: Katedra pw. Najświętszego Serca Pana Jezusa (Cathedral of the Sacred Heart of Jesus)

Current leadership
- Pope: Leo XIV
- Bishop: Jan Franciszek Wątroba
- Metropolitan Archbishop: Adam Szal
- Bishops emeritus: Kazimierz Górny; Edward Eugeniusz Białogłowski

Website
- Website of the Diocese

Map of Roman Catholic Diocese of Rzeszow

The Diocese of Rzeszów (Latin: Dioecesis Rzeszoviensis) is a Latin Church diocese of the Catholic Church located in the city of Rzeszów in the ecclesiastical province of Przemyśl in Poland. It was erected by Pope John Paul II on 25 March 1992, by the apostolic constitution Totus tuus Poloniae populus, from territories of the Diocese of Przemyśl and the Diocese of Tarnów.

== History ==
- 25 March 1992: Established as Diocese of Rzeszów from the Diocese of Przemyśl and Diocese of Tarnów

== Leadership ==
- Bishops of Rzeszów (Roman rite)
  - Bishop Kazimierz Górny (25 March 1992 – 14 June 2013)
  - Bishop Jan Wątroba (since 19 July 2013)

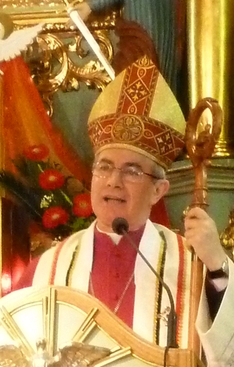
Bishop Jan Wątroba

== See also ==
- Roman Catholicism in Poland

== Sources ==
- GCatholic.org
- Catholic Hierarchy
- Diocese website
- Major Seminary of Rzeszów
