= Klizin-Kopaliny =

- Settlement
- Location within Poland
- Coordinates: 51°08′48″N 19°36′09″E
- Country: Poland
- Voivodeship: Łódź
- County: Radomsko
- Gmina: Kodrąb

Klizin-Kopaliny [ˈkliʑin kɔpaˈlinɨ] is a settlement in the administrative district of Gmina Kodrąb, within Radomsko County, Łódź Voivodeship, in central Poland.
