= Kuchary, Radomsko County =

Kuchary
- Settlement
- Location within Poland
- Coordinates: 51°5′38″N 19°33′2″E
- Country: Poland
- Voivodeship: Łódź
- County: Radomsko
- Gmina: Kodrąb

Kuchary [kuˈxarɨ] is a settlement in the administrative district of Gmina Kodrąb, within Radomsko County, Łódź Voivodeship, in central Poland.
