= Wacław Depo =

21st-century Polish Catholic bishop

Mgr. Wacław Depo
- Archbishop of Częstochowa
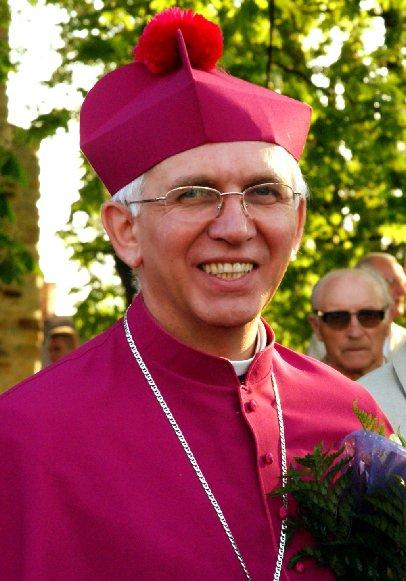
- Depo in 2009
- Church: Roman Catholic Church
- Archdiocese: Częstochowa
- In office: 2012 –
- Predecessor: Stanisław Nowak
- Previous post: Bishop of Zamość-Lubaczów (2006–2012)

Orders
- Ordination: 3 June 1978 by Piotr Gołębiowski
- Consecration: 9 September 2006 by Józef Michalik
- Rank: Archbishop

Personal details
- Born: 27 September 1953 (age 72) Szydłowiec, Poland
- Motto: Ad Christum Redemptorem Hominis
- Coat of arms

Wacław Tomasz Depo (born 27 September 1953) is a Polish Roman Catholic bishop, being the archbishop of the Roman Catholic Archdiocese of Częstochowa since 2012. He was previously the bishop of the Diocese of Zamość-Lubaczów from 2006 to 2012.

== Biography ==
=== Early life ===
He was born on 27 September 1953 in Szydłowiec. In 1972 he graduated from high school, and then studied at the major seminary in Sandomierz. He was ordained a priest on June 3, 1978, in the Sandomierz Cathedral by bishop Piotr Gołębiowski, then the apostolic administrator of the Roman Catholic Diocese of Sandomierz. He received a master's degree in dogmatic theology in 1980 at the Catholic University of Lublin. From 1980 to 1984 Depo continued his studies, and in 1982 he obtained a bachelor's degree, and in 1984 a doctorate based on the dissertation of kerygmatic Christ in the teaching of Martin Kähler, written under the guidance of Fr. Czesław Bartnik.

=== Academic and Priestly ministry ===
After being ordained a priest, from 1978 to 1980 Depo worked as the pastoral vicar in the parish of St. John the Baptist in Stromiec. From 1984 to 1990 he was an academic priest at the College of Engineering in Radom. In March 1992 Depo was officially transferred and incardinated as a priest for the Roman Catholic Diocese of Radom. In the diocese of Radom he was the director of the consecrated life of women's religious orders, he was also a member of the priesthood council and the college of consultants. He was appointed honorary canon of the Sandomierz cathedral chapter and prelate curator of the chapter of Our Lady of Ostra Brama in Skarżysko-Kamienna. In 2004, Pope John Paul II gave Depo the honorary prelate of "His Holiness".

In 1984–1989 he was the spiritual director for transitional deacons in the diocese of Radom. In 1989 he became the vice director, and in 1990 the rector, of the Radom seminary. From 1984 he lectured on dogmatic theology, ecumenical theology and introduction to theology at the Major Seminary and Theological Institute in Radom, and from 1992 on dogmatic theology at the Theological College of the Diocese of Radom. In the years 2000–2006 he worked as an adjunct in the Department of Christian Personality of the Cardinal Stefan Wyszyński University in Warsaw, and in 2007 he became a lecturer in the Department of Christian Personality of the John Paul II Catholic University of Lublin.

=== Ordination as bishop ===
On 5 August 2006, after Pope Benedict XVI accepted the resignation of Jan Śrutwa, Depo was appointed as the new diocesan bishop of the diocese of Zamość-Lubaczów. Ingres to the Cathedral of the Resurrection and Saint. Thomas the Apostle in Zamość, during which he received episcopal ordination, he held on September 9, 2006 [9]. The main consecrator was Józef Michalik, the metropolitan archbishop of Przemyśl, and the co-consecrators were Zygmunt Zimowski, diocesan bishop of Radom, and Jan Śrutwa, the former bishop of Zamość-Lubaczów. Depo chose the phrase "Ad Christum Redemptorem hominis" (Towards Christ the Redeemer of man) as his bishop's motto.

On 29 December 2011, Pope Benedict XVI appointed Depo as the new Archbishop of Częstochowa to replace Stanisław Nowak. Depo was officially installed as archbishop of Częstochowa on 2 February 2012 at the Cathedral Basilica of the Holy Family.

=== Life as Bishop ===
In 2017 Depo became the official state chaplain of the Knights of Columbus in Poland. During the COVID-19 pandemic in Poland, Depo claimed that war and gender ideology posed bigger threats to the Polish people than the coronavirus.
