= Stanisław Nowak =

Polish archbishop (1935–2021)

- Archbishop of Częstochowa
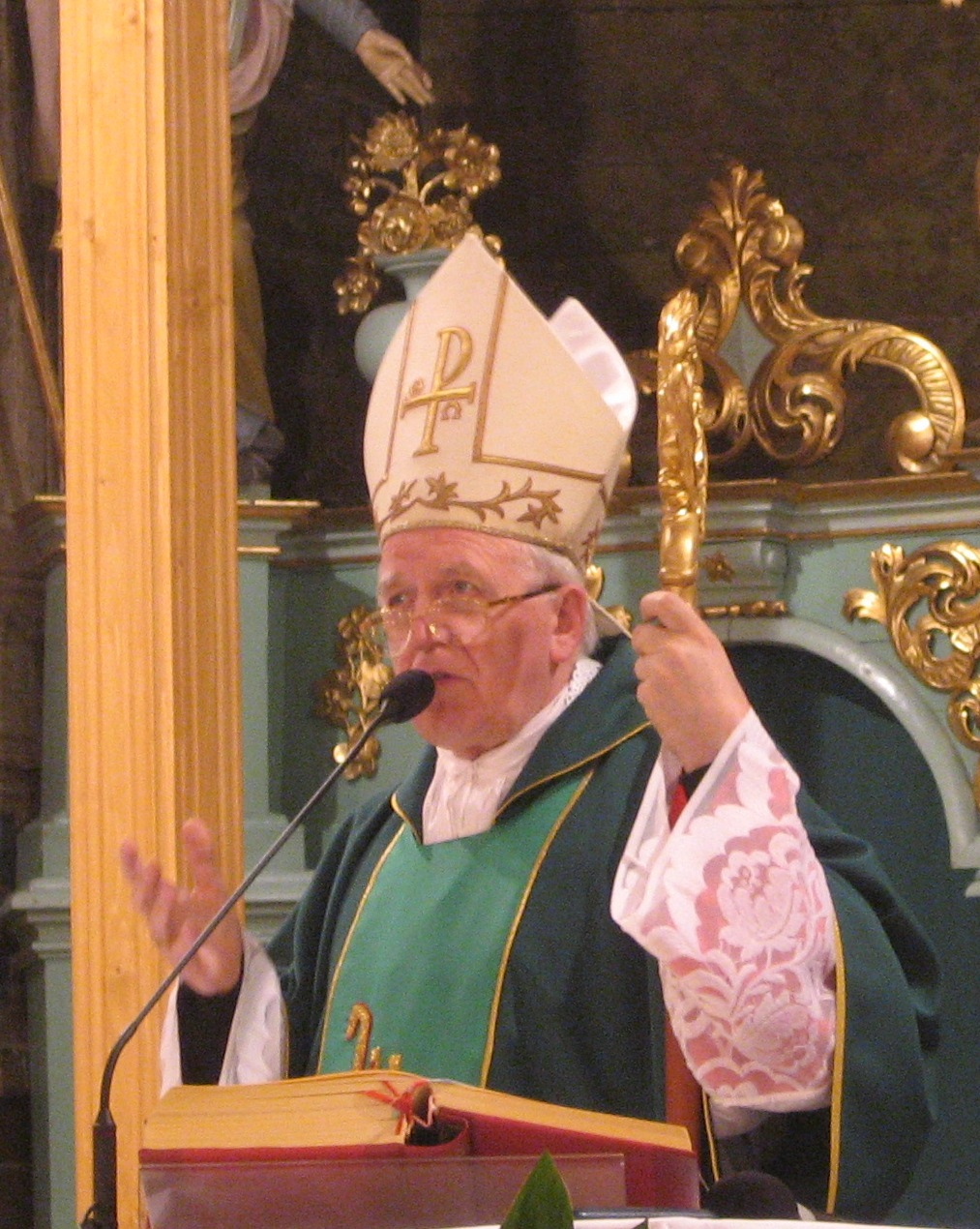
- Archbishop Stanisław Nowak in 2007
- Church: Latin Church
- In office: 25 March 1992 – 29 December 2011
- Predecessor: Stefan Bareła (as Bishop)
- Successor: Wacław Depo
- Previous post(s): Bishop of Częstochowa (1984–1992)

Orders
- Ordination: 22 June 1958 by Eugeniusz Baziak
- Consecration: 25 November 1984 by Józef Glemp

Personal details
- Born: 11 July 1935; Jeziorzany, Poland
- Died: 12 December 2021 (aged 86); Częstochowa, Poland
- Buried: Częstochowa Cathedral
- Motto: Iuxta crucem Tecum stare

Stanisław Nowak (11 July 1935 – 12 December 2021) was a Polish Roman Catholic prelate. He was archbishop of Częstochowa from 1984 to 2011.
