= Kodrąb, Łódź Voivodeship =

Kodrąb
- Village
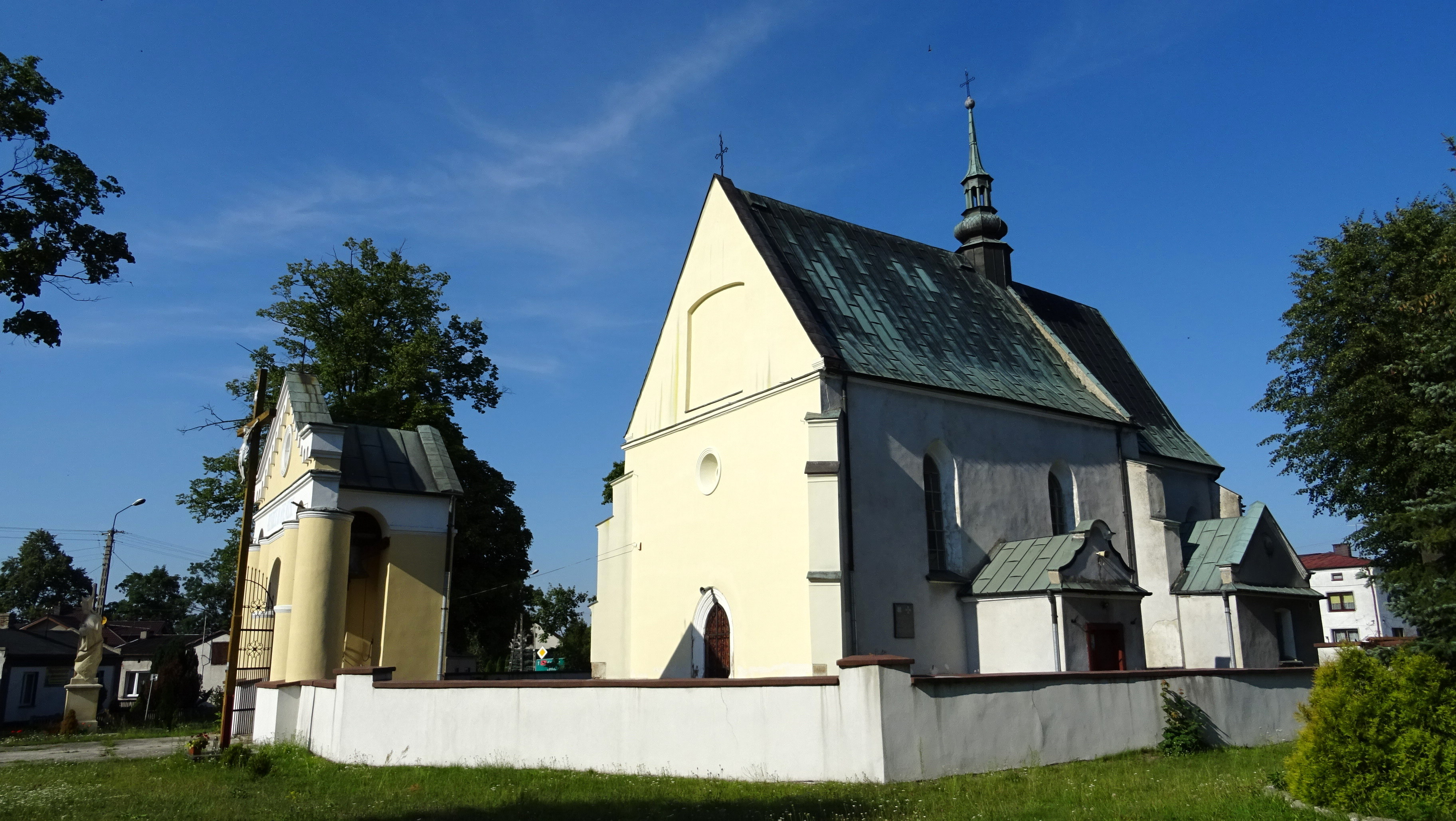
- Catholic church

- Location within Poland
- Coordinates: 51°5′54″N 19°37′43″E
- Country: Poland
- Voivodeship: Łódź
- County: Radomsko
- Gmina: Kodrąb

Kodrąb [ˈkɔdrɔmp] is a village in Radomsko County, Łódź Voivodeship, in central Poland. It is the seat of the gmina (administrative district) called Gmina Kodrąb.

== Transport ==
Kodrąb lies along national road 42 connecting it to Przedbórz to the east and to Radomsko to the west.

The nearest railway station is in Radomsko.
