= Antopol, Łódź Voivodeship =

Antopol
- Village
- Location within Poland
- Coordinates: 51°5′2″N 19°32′45″E
- Country: Poland
- Voivodeship: Łódź
- County: Radomsko
- Gmina: Kodrąb
- Population: 30

Antopol [anˈtɔpɔl] is a village in the administrative district of Gmina Kodrąb, within Radomsko County, Łódź Voivodeship, in central Poland.
