= Zapolice, Radomsko County =

Zapolice
- Village
- Location within Poland
- Coordinates: 51°5′10″N 19°38′2″E
- Country: Poland
- Voivodeship: Łódź
- County: Radomsko
- Gmina: Kodrąb

Zapolice [zapɔˈlit͡sɛ] is a village in the administrative district of Gmina Kodrąb, within Radomsko County, Łódź Voivodeship, in central Poland.
