= Florentynów, Radomsko County =

Florentynów
- Village
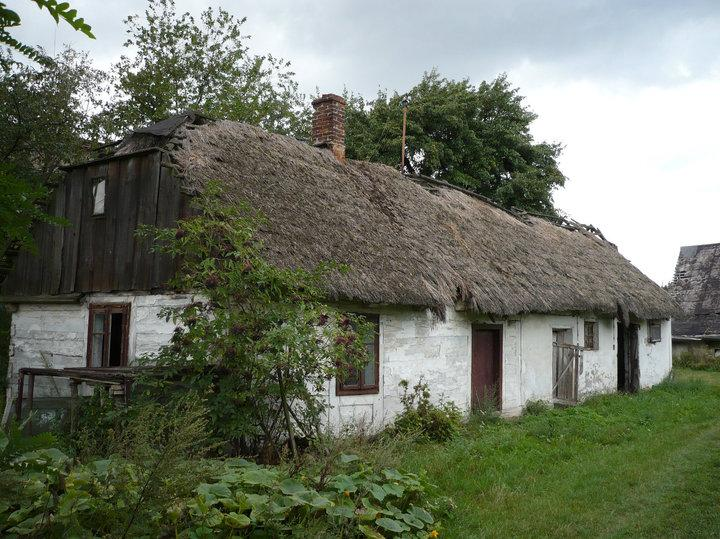

- Location within Poland
- Coordinates: 51°4′41″N 19°31′21″E
- Country: Poland
- Voivodeship: Łódź
- County: Radomsko
- Gmina: Kodrąb

Florentynów [flɔrɛnˈtɨnuf] is a village in the administrative district of Gmina Kodrąb, within Radomsko County, Łódź Voivodeship, in central Poland.
