= Konradów, Łódź Voivodeship =

Konradów
- Village
- Location within Poland
- Coordinates: 51°5′50″N 19°31′56″E
- Country: Poland
- Voivodeship: Łódź
- County: Radomsko
- Gmina: Kodrąb

Konradów [kɔnˈraduf] is a village in the administrative district of Gmina Kodrąb, within Radomsko County, Łódź Voivodeship, in central Poland.
