= Teodor Kubina =

Roman Catholic bishop (1880 – 1951)

- Bishop of Częstochowa
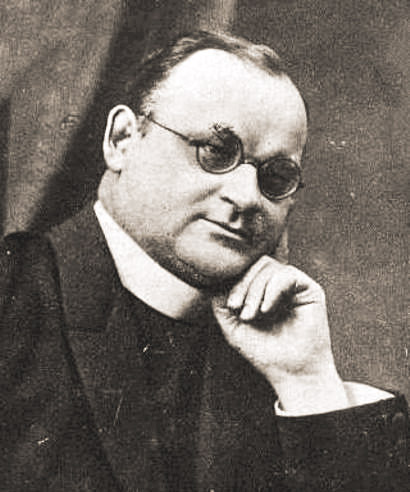
- Appointed: 14 December 1925
- Successor: Zdzisław Goliński

Orders
- Ordination: 27 October 1906 by Georg von Kopp
- Consecration: 2 February 1926 by Adam Stefan Sapieha

Personal details
- Born: 16 April 1880; Świętochłowice
- Died: 13 February 1951 (aged 70)
- Motto: Miseror super turbam

Teodor Filip Kubina (16 April 1880 – 13 February 1951) was a Roman Catholic bishop of the Diocese of Częstochowa.

== Biography ==
Kubina was born on 16 April 1880 in Świętochłowice to Maciej and Joanna Kubina (née Rolka). He completed primary education at Świętochłowice in 1892, later attending a gymnasium in Królewska Huta (now Chorzów), from which he obtained his matura on 8 March 1901. After this, he began studying philosophy and theology at the Faculty of Theology of the University of Wrocław; he was sent to study at Rome after a semester, obtaining a doctorate in philosophy from the Pontifical University of Saint Thomas Aquinas on 25 June 1904 and a doctorate in theology from the Pontifical Gregorian University on 29 July 1907. He was ordained a priest on 27 October 1906 by Georg von Kopp.

In 1907, Kubina was appointed vicar of the parish of Mikołów. In this position, he was described by Stanisław Grzybek as "revealing his character as a zealous priest...and a true Pole", advocating for the translation of the Bible into Polish and promoting Polish publications amongst his parishoners. He was soon made vicar for Królewska Huta and later Kołobrzeg in 1909. In 1913, he was appointed provost in Pankow. He was appointed provost of St. Mary's Church in Katowice in 1917, where he ministered to both German and Polish parishoners. He also founded and served as editor of the Gościa Niedzielnego, a diocesan weekly newspaper.

On 14 December 1925, Kubina was appointed by Pope Benedict XV as the first bishop of the Diocese of Częstochowa. He was consecrated on 2 February 1926 at Jasna Góra Monastery by Adam Stefan Sapieha. He was co-consecrated by August Hlond and Augustyn Łosiński. He attended the 28th International Eucharistic Congress on behalf of the Polish Episcopal Conference in 1926, holding similar eucharistic congresses throughout the Diocese of Częstochowa in 1928, 1929 and 1931. In 1931, he was awarded a honoris causa doctorate from Jagiellonian University. He was awarded the Commander's Cross with Star of the Order of Polonia Restituta in 1935 for his social work. Kubina died on 13 February 1951.
