= Barwinek, Łódź Voivodeship =

Barwinek
- Settlement
- Location within Poland
- Coordinates: 51°7′9″N 19°40′8″E
- Country: Poland
- Voivodeship: Łódź
- County: Radomsko
- Gmina: Kodrąb

Barwinek [barˈvʲinɛk] is a settlement in the administrative district of Gmina Kodrąb, within Radomsko County, Łódź Voivodeship, in central Poland.
