= St. Peter Canisius Minor Seminary, Mertoyudan =

Secondary Catholic school in Indonesia

Peter Canisius Minor Seminary Mertoyudan

Location
- Jalan Raya Mayjend Bambang Soegeng 15; Magelang, Central Java; Indonesia

Information
- Type: Private secondary school
- Motto: Latin: Sanctitas, Sanitas, Scientia (Holiness, Health, Knowledge)
- Religious affiliation: Catholicism
- Denomination: Jesuit
- Established: 1912; 114 years ago
- Rector: Hilarius Budiarto Gomulia, SJ
- Principal: Julius Mario Plea Lagaor, SJ
- Gender: Boys
- Mascot: Dog
- Website: seminarimertoyudan.sch.id

Peter Canisius Minor Seminary Mertoyudan (Indonesian: Seminari Petrus Kanisius Mertoyudan) is a private Catholic secondary school for boys intending to be Catholic priests, located in Magelang, Central Java, Indonesia. The school was founded in 1912 by the Society of Jesus.

== Overview ==
The establishment of the Mertoyudan Seminary originated from the desire of two local male youths who graduated from Kweekschool, Muntilan in 1911 to become Catholic priests. They were Petrus Darmaseputra and Fransiskus Xaverius Satiman. In November 1911, with the support of Fr. Franciscus van Lith, SJ and Father Mertens, SJ, Darmaseputra and Satiman applied to be accepted as seminarians to become Catholic priests. The request of these two young men, together with the rise of the Indonesian nationalist movement and a demand for local priests, created the spark to establish a seminary for Javanese young men. On May 30, 1912, through the grant of the official permission from the Vatican it became the first seminary in Indonesia.

After the achievement of Indonesia's independence in 1945, the seminary assisted in the schooling of policemen.

== See also ==
- Catholic Church in Indonesia
- Education in Indonesia
- List of Jesuit schools
