= Archdiocese of Częstochowa =

Roman Catholic archdiocese in Poland

Coordinates: 50.8088°N 19.1272°E

Archdiocese of Częstochowa Archidioecesis Czestochoviensis Archidiecezja Częstochowska

Catholic
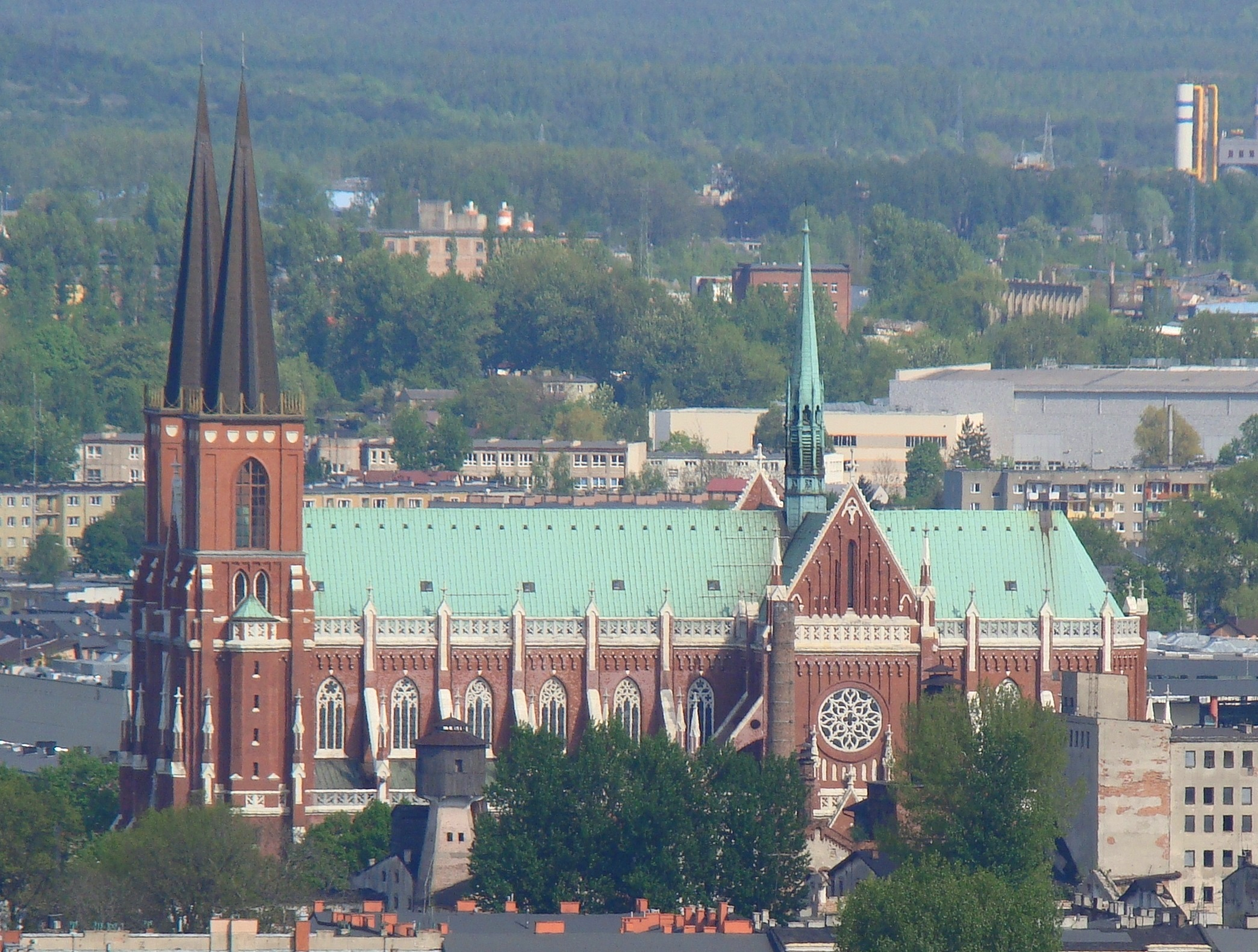
- The Cathedral Basilica of the Holy Family in Częstochowa

Location
- Country: Poland

Statistics
- Area: 6,925 km^{2} (2,674 sq mi)
- Population: Total; Catholics: (as of 2021); 707,512; 686,686 (97.1%)

Information
- Rite: Latin Rite
- Established: 28 October 1925
- Cathedral: Basilica of the Holy Family

Current leadership
- Pope: Leo XIV
- Metropolitan Archbishop: Wacław Depo
- Suffragans: Diocese of Radom; Diocese of Sosnowiec
- Vicar General: Marian Mikołajczyk
- Bishops emeritus: Antoni Józef Długosz

Website
- Website of the Archdiocese

The Archdiocese of Częstochowa (Latin: Archidioecesis Czestochoviensis) is a Latin Church archdiocese of the Catholic Church located in the city of Częstochowa in Poland.

== History ==
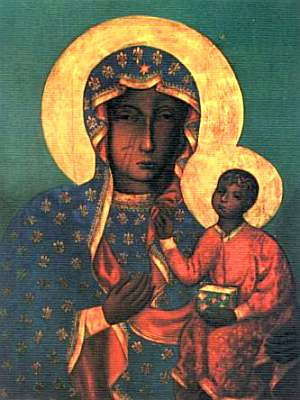
The Black Madonna of Częstochowa.

- October 28, 1925: Established as Diocese of Częstochowa from the Diocese of Włocławek and the Diocese of Kielce. Its served as a suffragan diocese to the newly formed ecclesiastical province of the Archdiocese of Krakow
- March 25, 1992: Promoted as Metropolitan Archdiocese of Częstochowa

== Special churches ==
- Minor Basilica, National Shrine: Bazylika Jasnogórska Wniebowzięcia N.M.P. / Sanktuarium Najświętszej Maryi Panny Częstochowskiej
  (Jasna Góra Basilica of the Assumption of the Blessed Virgin Mary), Częstochowa
- Minor Basilica: Bazylika pw. Wniebowzięcia Najświętszej Maryi Panny (OO Dominikanów)
  (Basilica of the Assumption of the Blessed Virgin Mary), Gidle

== Leadership ==
- Bishops of Częstochowa (Roman rite):
  - Bishop Teodor Kubina (1925.12.14 – 1951.02.13)
  - Bishop Zdzisław Goliński (1951.04.22 – 1963.07.06)
  - Bishop Stefan Bareła (1964.01.17 – 1984.02.12)
  - Bishop Stanisław Nowak (1984.10.26 – 1992.03.25)
- Archbishops of Częstochowa (Roman rite):
  - Archbishop Stanisław Nowak (1992.03.25 – 2011.12.29)
  - Archbishop Wacław Depo (since 2011.12.29)

== Suffragan dioceses ==
- Radom
- Sosnowiec

== See also ==
- Roman Catholicism in Poland
- Minor Seminary of the Archdiocese of Częstochowa

== Sources ==
- GCatholic.org
- Catholic Hierarchy
- Diocese website
