= St. Paul Minor Seminary, Palembang =

Coordinates: 2.9681804°S 104.7641417°E

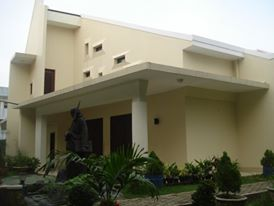
Saint Paul seminary

St. Paul Seminary (St. Paul) is a high school level education institutions for prospective clergy (monks, priests) Roman Catholic in Palembang, Indonesia.
