= Częstochowa Cathedral =

Coordinates: 50.8089°N 19.1272°E

Cathedral Basilica of the Holy Family
- Bazylika Archikatedralna Sanktuarium Świętej Rodziny
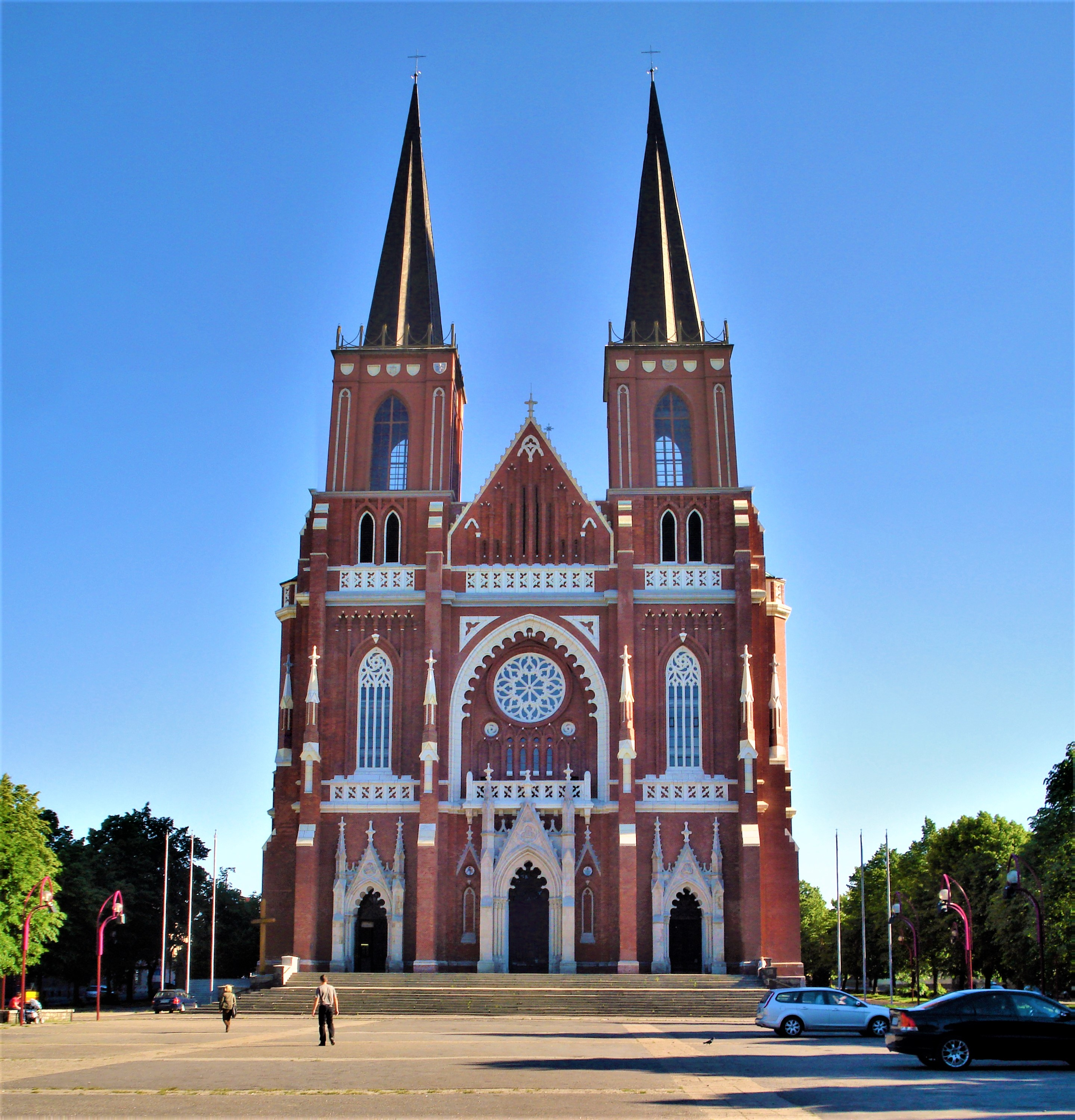
- Cathedral Basilica of the Holy Family
- Location: Częstochowa
- Country: Poland
- Denomination: Roman Catholic Church

The Cathedral Basilica of the Holy Family (Polish: Bazylika Archikatedralna Sanktuarium Świętej Rodziny ) also called Częstochowa Cathedral is a Roman Catholic minor basilica built in the neo-Gothic style, it is a three-nave church following the Roman or Latin rite and is located on the street Krakowska in Częstochowa, Poland.

Pope John XXIII raised the shrine to the status of Minor Basilica via the Pontifical decree Molis Amplitudine Ornamentorum on 22 June 1962. The decree was signed and notarized by Cardinal Amleto Cicognani.

It is one of the largest of its kind in Europe, built on an old cemetery in the years 1825–1898. It was built between 1901 and 1927 and designed by Konstanty Wojciechowski. The temple in 1925 became the cathedral of the diocese of Częstochowa, and since 1992 is the metropolitan church of the ecclesiastical province of Czestochowa. The facade of the basilica is north; opposite the John Paul II Square (formerly Cathedral Square). In the Chapel of Our Lady of Czestochowa there is a crypt of the local bishops.

== See also ==
- Roman Catholicism in Poland
- Cathedral Basilica of the Holy Family

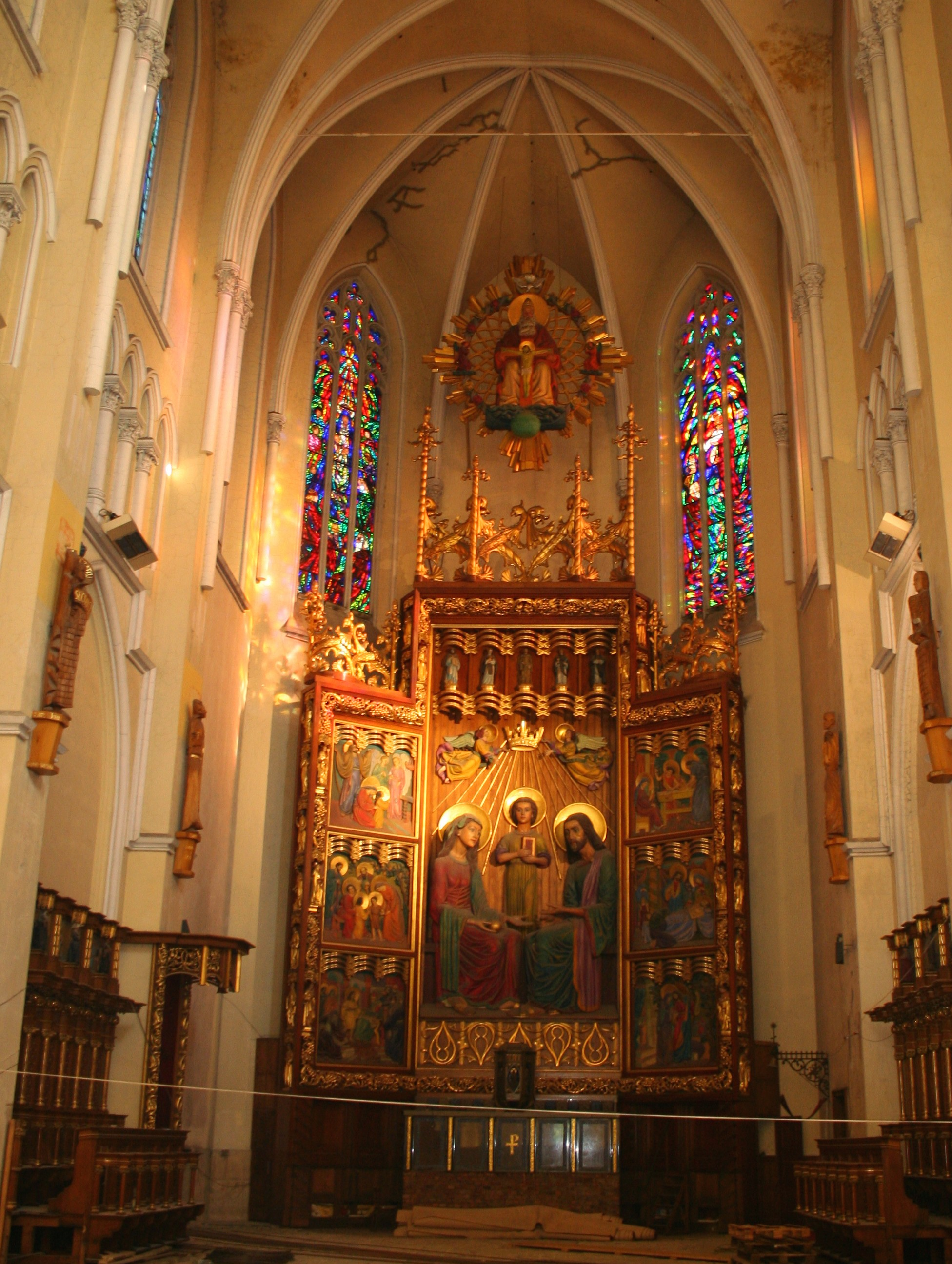
Internal view
