= Michałów, Radomsko County =

Michałów
- Village
- Location within Poland
- Coordinates: 51°13′45″N 19°31′17″E
- Country: Poland
- Voivodeship: Łódź
- County: Radomsko
- Gmina: Kamieńsk

Michałów [miˈxawuf] is a village in the administrative district of Gmina Kamieńsk, within Radomsko County, Łódź Voivodeship, in central Poland.
