= Barycz, Radomsko County =

Barycz
- Village
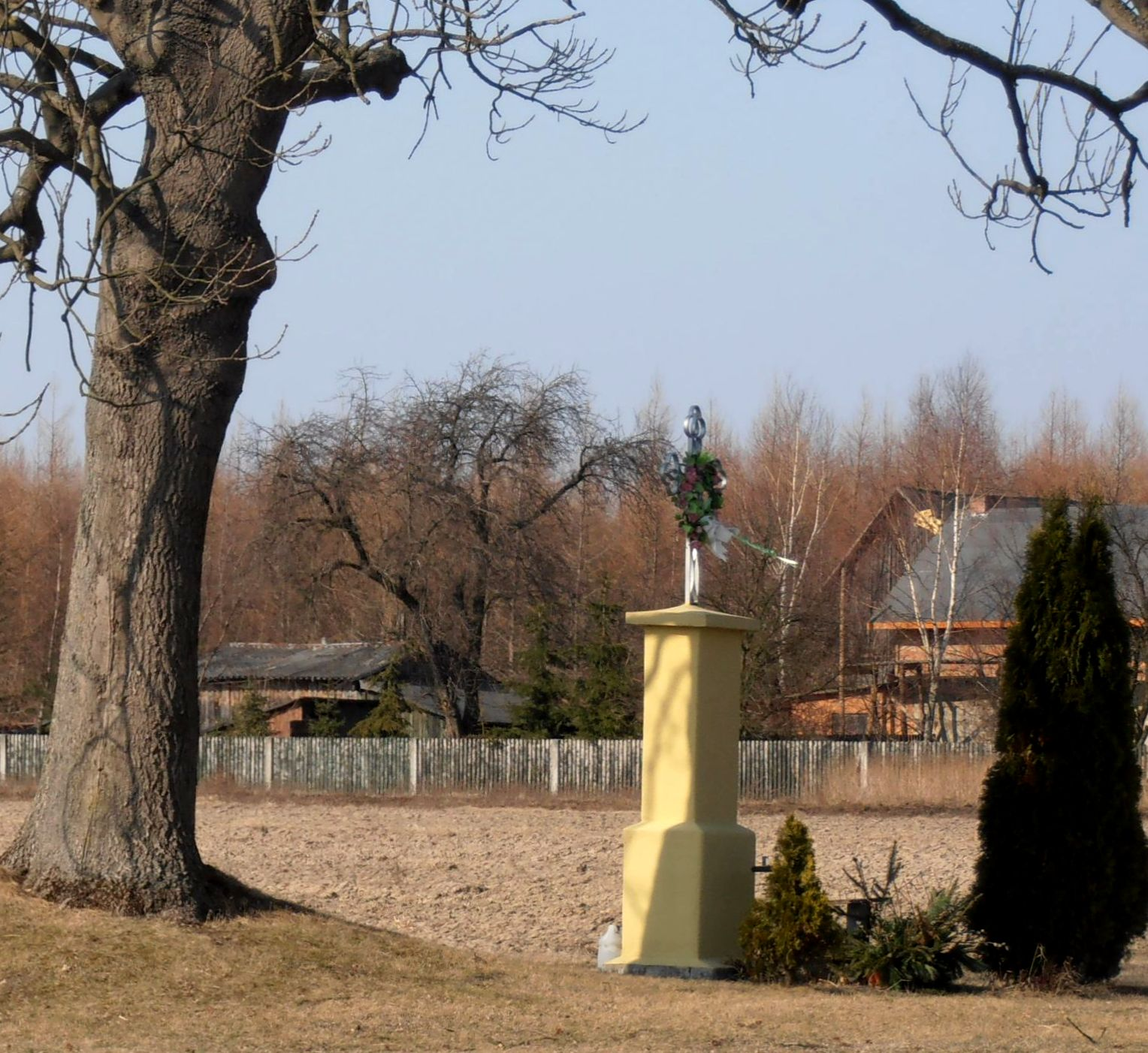

- Location within Poland
- Coordinates: 50°55′47″N 19°46′55″E
- Country: Poland
- Voivodeship: Łódź
- County: Radomsko
- Gmina: Żytno

Barycz [ˈbarɨt͡ʂ] is a village in the administrative district of Gmina Żytno, within Radomsko County, Łódź Voivodeship, in central Poland.
