= Załawie =

- Village
- Location within Poland
- Coordinates: 50°55′15″N 19°38′13″E
- Country: Poland
- Voivodeship: Łódź
- County: Radomsko
- Gmina: Żytno

Załawie [zaˈwavjɛ] is a village in the administrative district of Gmina Żytno, within Radomsko County, Łódź Voivodeship, in central Poland.
