= Wola Jedlińska =

- Village
- Location within Poland
- Coordinates: 51°5′N 19°18′E
- Country: Poland
- Voivodeship: Łódź
- County: Radomsko
- Gmina: Ładzice

Wola Jedlińska [ˈvɔla jɛdˈliɲska] is a village in the administrative district of Gmina Ładzice, within Radomsko County, Łódź Voivodeship, in central Poland.
