= Sudzinek =

- Village
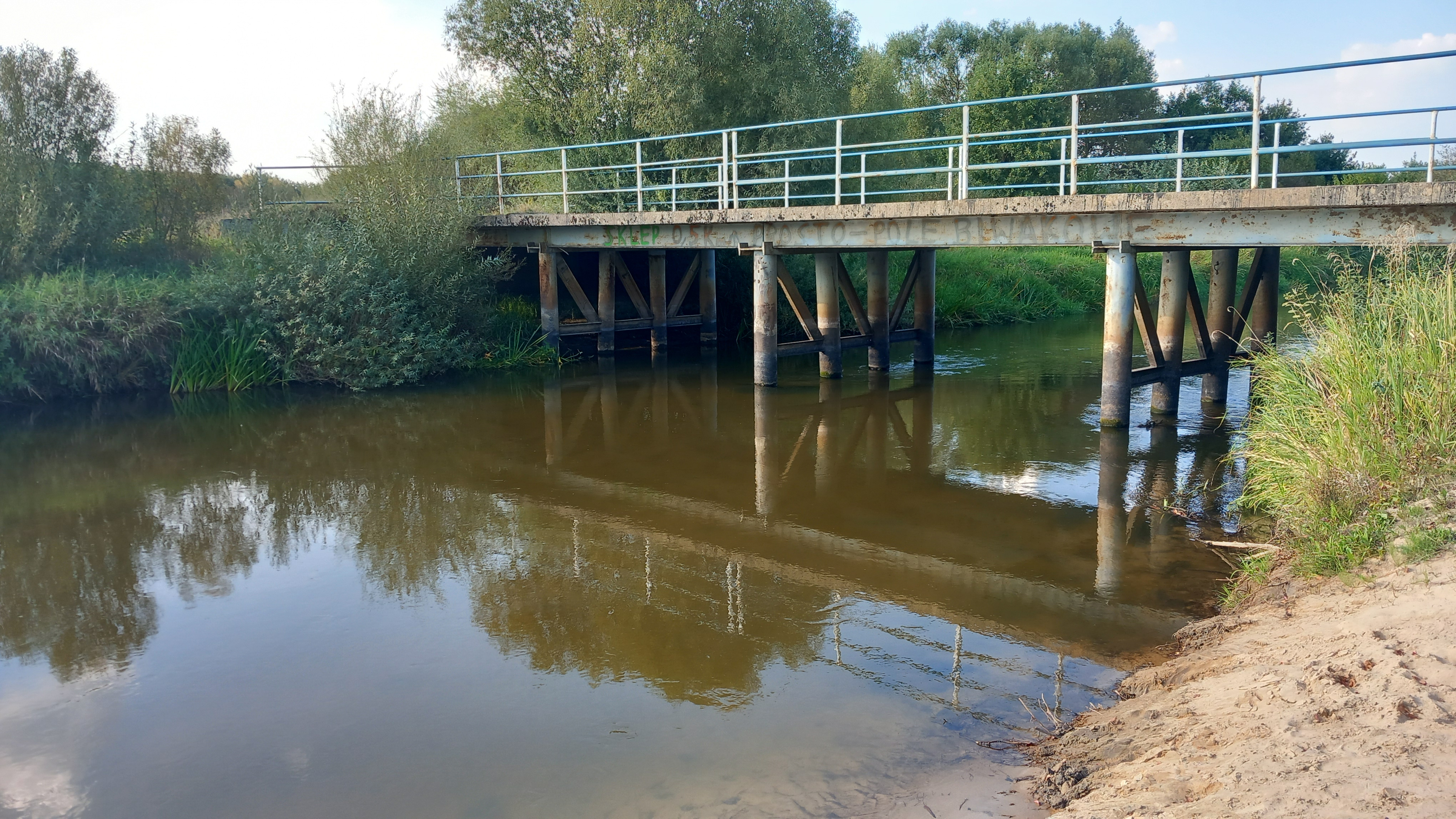

- Location within Poland
- Coordinates: 50°56′N 19°50′E
- Country: Poland
- Voivodeship: Łódź
- County: Radomsko
- Gmina: Żytno

Sudzinek [suˈd͡ʑinɛk] is a village in the administrative district of Gmina Żytno, within Radomsko County, Łódź Voivodeship, in central Poland.
