= Mała Wieś, Radomsko County =

Mała Wieś
- Village
- Location within Poland
- Coordinates: 50°56′52″N 19°36′30″E
- Country: Poland
- Voivodeship: Łódź
- County: Radomsko
- Gmina: Żytno
- Population: 330

Mała Wieś [ˈmawa ˈvjɛɕ] is a village in the administrative district of Gmina Żytno, within Radomsko County, Łódź Voivodeship, in central Poland.
