= Żaby =

Żaby may refer to:

- Żaby, Łódź Voivodeship, Poland
- Żaby, Masovian Voivodeship, Poland
