= Kolonia Czechowiec =

- Village
- Location within Poland
- Coordinates: 50°51′26″N 19°40′38″E
- Country: Poland
- Voivodeship: Łódź
- County: Radomsko
- Gmina: Żytno

Kolonia Czechowiec [kɔˈlɔɲa t͡ʂɛˈxɔvjɛt͡s] is a village in the administrative district of Gmina Żytno, within Radomsko County, Łódź Voivodeship, in central Poland.
