= Ewina =

- Village
- Location within Poland
- Coordinates: 50°57′N 19°34′E
- Country: Poland
- Voivodeship: Łódź
- County: Radomsko
- Gmina: Żytno

Ewina [ɛˈvina] is a village in the administrative district of Gmina Żytno, within Radomsko County, Łódź Voivodeship, in central Poland.
