= Sowin =

Sowin may refer to the following villages in Poland:

- Sowin, Lublin Voivodeship (east Poland)
- Sowin, Opole Voivodeship (south-west Poland)
- Sowin, Łódź Voivodeship (central Poland)
