= Adamów, Radomsko County =

Adamów
- Village
- Location within Poland
- Coordinates: 51°6′3″N 19°17′35″E
- Country: Poland
- Voivodeship: Łódź
- County: Radomsko
- Gmina: Ładzice

Adamów [aˈdamuf] is a village in the administrative district of Gmina Ładzice, within Radomsko County, Łódź Voivodeship, in central Poland.
