= Kąty, Radomsko County =

Kąty
- Village
- Location within Poland
- Coordinates: 50°54′56″N 19°48′57″E
- Country: Poland
- Voivodeship: Łódź
- County: Radomsko
- Gmina: Żytno
- Population: 63

Kąty [ˈkɔntɨ] is a village in the administrative district of Gmina Żytno, within Radomsko County, Łódź Voivodeship, in central Poland.
