= Krzywanice, Łódź Voivodeship =

Krzywanice
- Village
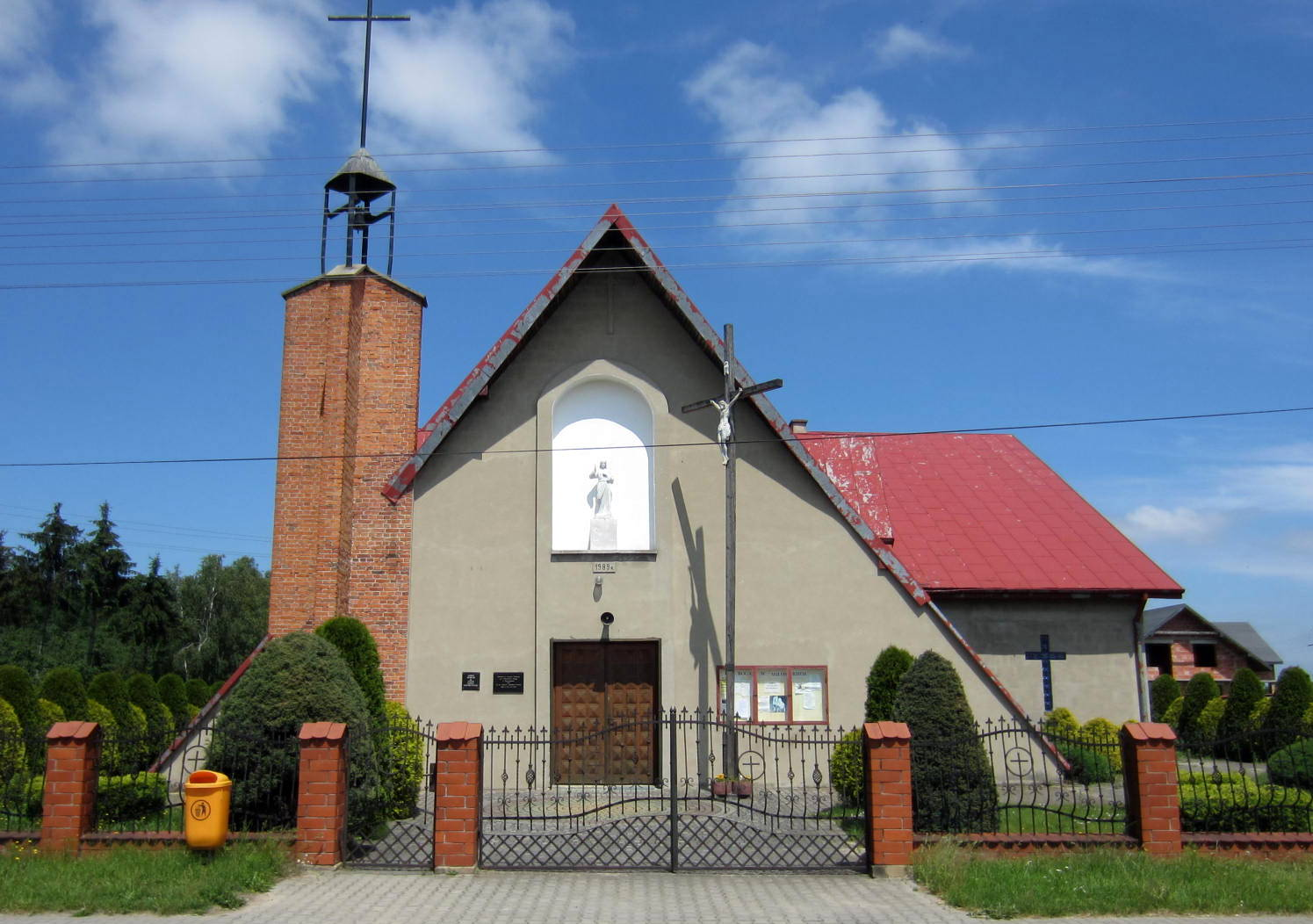
- Catholic church

- Location within Poland
- Coordinates: 51°9′47″N 19°15′2″E
- Country: Poland
- Voivodeship: Łódź
- County: Radomsko
- Gmina: Lgota Wielka
- Population: 550

Krzywanice [kʂɨvaˈnit͡sɛ] is a village in the administrative district of Gmina Lgota Wielka, within Radomsko County, Łódź Voivodeship, in central Poland.
