= Jacków, Radomsko County =

Jacków
- Village
- Location within Poland
- Coordinates: 50°58′35″N 19°41′47″E
- Country: Poland
- Voivodeship: Łódź
- County: Radomsko
- Gmina: Żytno

Jacków [ˈjat͡skuf] is a village in the administrative district of Gmina Żytno, within Radomsko County, Łódź Voivodeship, in central Poland.
