= Silnica, Łódź Voivodeship =

Silnica
- Village
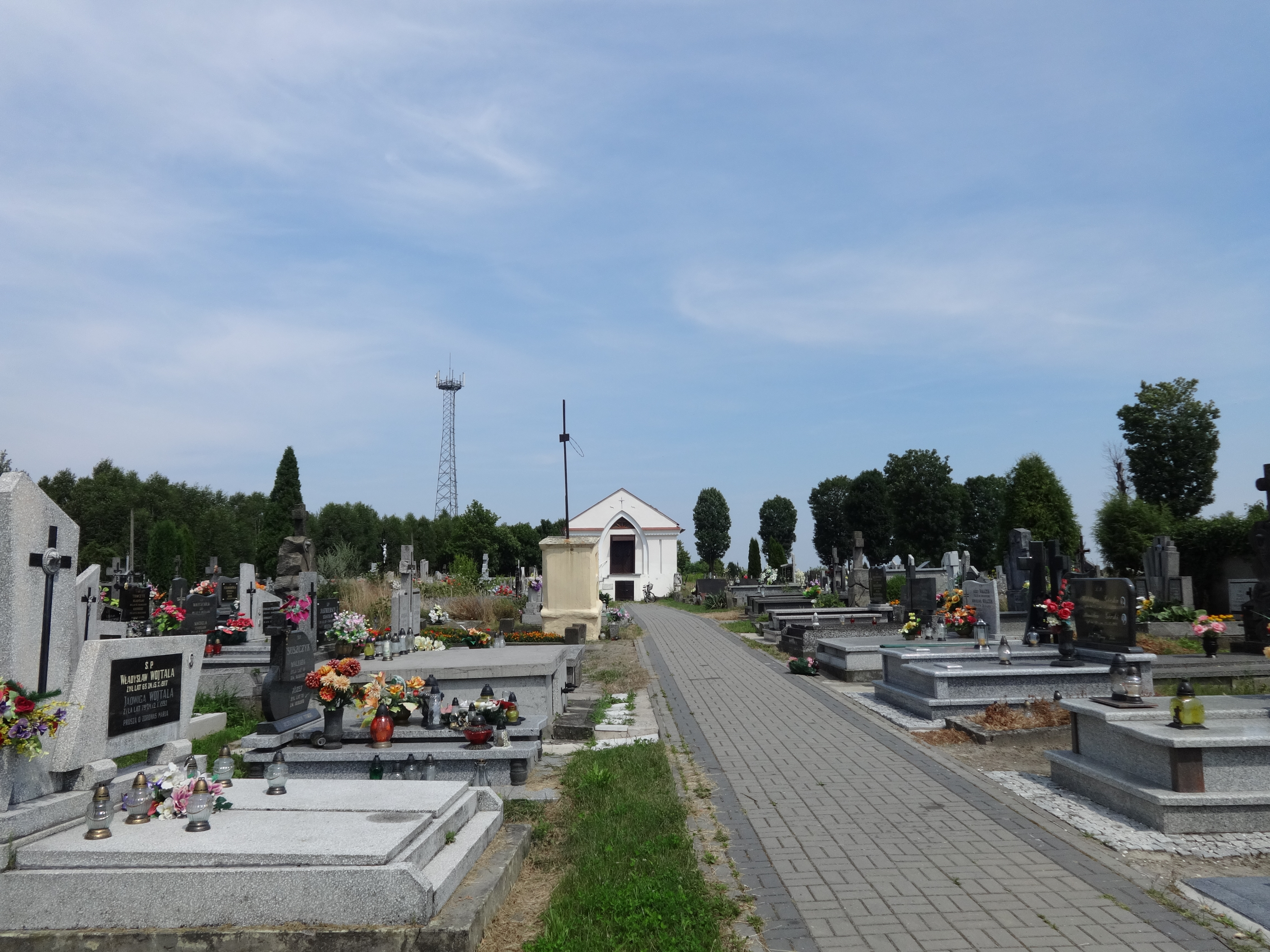
- Cemetery

- Location within Poland
- Coordinates: 50°56′N 19°41′E
- Country: Poland
- Voivodeship: Łódź
- County: Radomsko
- Gmina: Żytno

Silnica [ɕilˈnit͡sa] is a village in the administrative district of Gmina Żytno, within Radomsko County, Łódź Voivodeship, in central Poland.
