= Nurek =

Nurek can refer to:

- Nurak, a city in Tajikistan
- Nurek Dam, a dam in Tajikistan, or its reservoir
- Nurek, Łódź Voivodeship (central Poland)
