= Józefów, Gmina Ładzice =

Józefów
- Village
- Location within Poland
- Coordinates: 51°05′47″N 19°24′17″E
- Country: Poland
- Voivodeship: Łódź
- County: Radomsko
- Gmina: Ładzice

Józefów (Polish pronunciation: [juˈzɛfuf]) is a village in the administrative district of Gmina Ładzice, within Radomsko County, Łódź Voivodeship, in central Poland.
