= Wierzbica, Łódź Voivodeship =

Wierzbica
- Village
- Location within Poland
- Coordinates: 51°6′37″N 19°22′4″E
- Country: Poland
- Voivodeship: Łódź
- County: Radomsko
- Gmina: Ładzice
- Population: 530

Wierzbica [vjɛʐˈbit͡sa] is a village in the administrative district of Gmina Ładzice, within Radomsko County, Łódź Voivodeship, in central Poland.
