= Huta Porajska =

- Village
- Location within Poland
- Coordinates: 51°15′40″N 19°31′1″E
- Country: Poland
- Voivodeship: Łódź
- County: Radomsko
- Gmina: Kamieńsk

Huta Porajska [ˈxuta pɔˈrai̯ska] is a village in the administrative district of Gmina Kamieńsk, within Radomsko County, Łódź Voivodeship, in central Poland.
