= Wiewiórów, Gmina Dobryszyce =

Wiewiórów
- Village
- Location within Poland
- Coordinates: 51°10′01″N 19°22′26″E
- Country: Poland
- Voivodeship: Łódź
- County: Radomsko
- Gmina: Dobryszyce

Wiewiórów [vjɛˈvjuruf] is a village in the administrative district of Gmina Dobryszyce, within Radomsko County, Łódź Voivodeship, in central Poland.
