= Borowa, Gmina Dobryszyce =

Borowa
- Village
- Location within Poland
- Coordinates: 51°11′19″N 19°22′51″E
- Country: Poland
- Voivodeship: Łódź
- County: Radomsko
- Gmina: Dobryszyce
- Population: 150

Borowa [bɔˈrɔva] is a village in the administrative district of Gmina Dobryszyce, within Radomsko County, Łódź Voivodeship, in central Poland.
