= Bugaj, Radomsko County =

Bugaj
- Village
- Location within Poland
- Coordinates: 50°55′5″N 19°37′39″E
- Country: Poland
- Voivodeship: Łódź
- County: Radomsko
- Gmina: Żytno

Bugaj [ˈbuɡai̯] is a village in the administrative district of Gmina Żytno, within Radomsko County, Łódź Voivodeship, in central Poland.
