= Borzykowa =

Borzykowa may refer to:

- Borzykowa, Łódź Voivodeship, Poland
  - Synod of Borzykowa, a Roman Catholic council called by Henryk Kietlicz in 1210
- Borzykowa, Świętokrzyskie Voivodeship, Poland
