= Sady, Łódź Voivodeship =

Sady
- Village
- Location within Poland
- Coordinates: 50°53′24″N 19°41′0″E
- Country: Poland
- Voivodeship: Łódź
- County: Radomsko
- Gmina: Żytno

Sady [ˈsadɨ] is a village in the administrative district of Gmina Żytno, within Radomsko County, Łódź Voivodeship, in central Poland.
