= Magdalenki, Łódź Voivodeship =

Magdalenki
- Village
- Location within Poland
- Coordinates: 50°54′18″N 19°36′50″E
- Country: Poland
- Voivodeship: Łódź
- County: Radomsko
- Gmina: Żytno

Magdalenki [maɡdaˈlɛŋki] is a village in the administrative district of Gmina Żytno, within Radomsko County, Łódź Voivodeship, in central Poland.
