= Jedlno Drugie =

- Village
- Location within Poland
- Coordinates: 51°4′27″N 19°14′34″E
- Country: Poland
- Voivodeship: Łódź
- County: Radomsko
- Gmina: Ładzice

Jedlno Drugie [ˈjɛdlnɔ ˈdruɡʲɛ] is a village in the administrative district of Gmina Ładzice, within Radomsko County, Łódź Voivodeship, in central Poland.
