= Maluszyn, Łódź Voivodeship =

Maluszyn
- Village
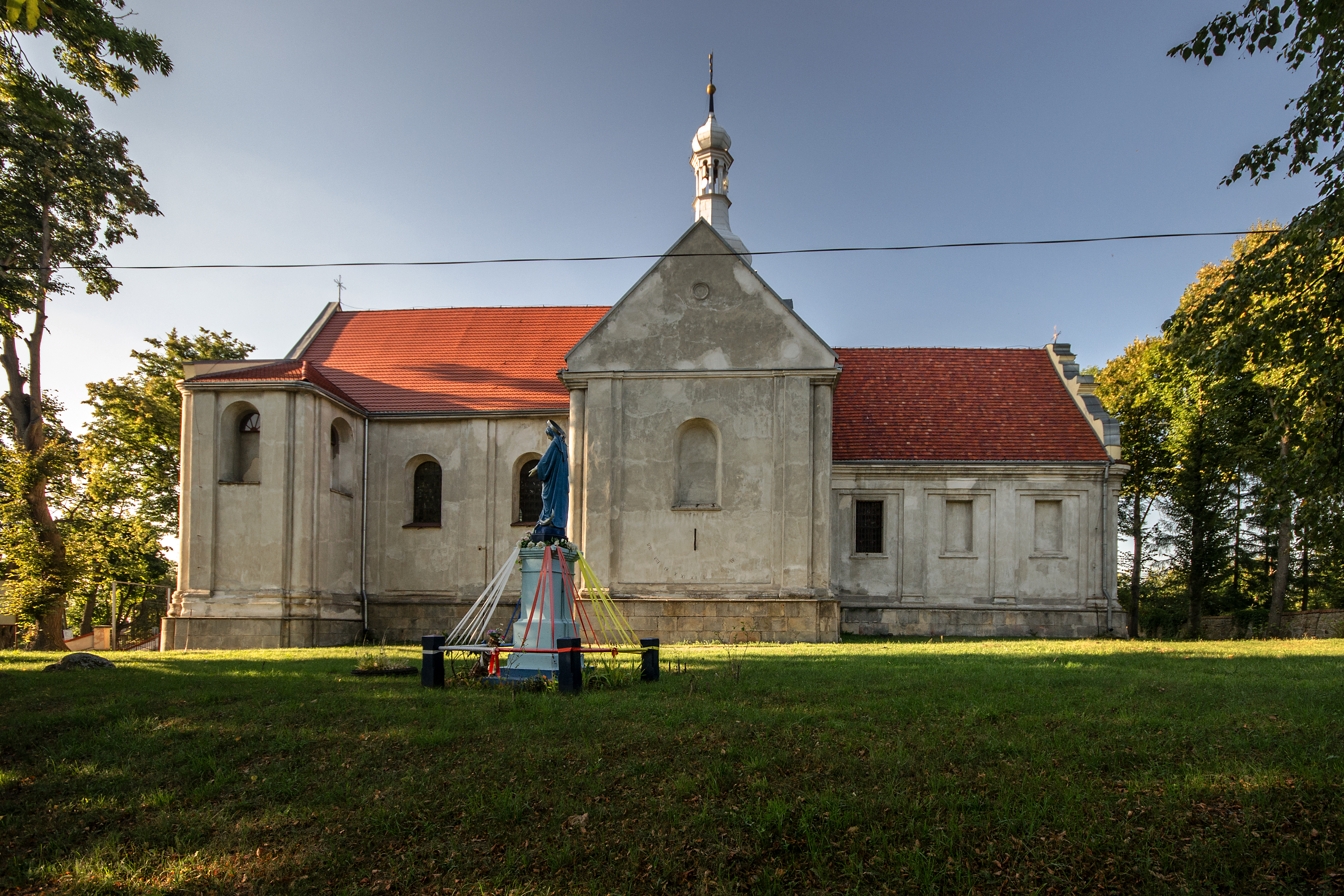
- Catholic church

- Location within Poland
- Coordinates: 50°54′48″N 19°47′40″E
- Country: Poland
- Voivodeship: Łódź
- County: Radomsko
- Gmina: Żytno
- Population (approx.): 280

Maluszyn [maˈluʂɨn] is a village in the administrative district of Gmina Żytno, within Radomsko County, Łódź Voivodeship, in central Poland.

The village has an approximate population of 280.
