= Borki, Gmina Ładzice =

Borki
- Settlement
- Location within Poland
- Coordinates: 51°03′49″N 19°14′04″E
- Country: Poland
- Voivodeship: Łódź
- County: Radomsko
- Gmina: Ładzice

Borki [ˈbɔrki] is a settlement in the administrative district of Gmina Ładzice, within Radomsko County, Łódź Voivodeship, in central Poland.
