= Rędziny-Kolonia =

- Village
- Location within Poland
- Coordinates: 50°57′45″N 19°37′2″E
- Country: Poland
- Voivodeship: Łódź
- County: Radomsko
- Gmina: Żytno
- Population: 110

Rędziny-Kolonia [rɛnˈd͡ʑinɨ kɔˈlɔɲa] is a village in the administrative district of Gmina Żytno, within Radomsko County, Łódź Voivodeship, in central Poland.
