= Ignaców, Radomsko County =

Ignaców
- Village
- Location within Poland
- Coordinates: 50°52′32″N 19°42′10″E
- Country: Poland
- Voivodeship: Łódź
- County: Radomsko
- Gmina: Żytno

Ignaców [iɡˈnat͡suf] is a village in the administrative district of Gmina Żytno, within Radomsko County, Łódź Voivodeship, in central Poland.
