= Rożny =

- Village
- Location within Poland
- Coordinates: 51°8′N 19°23′E
- Country: Poland
- Voivodeship: Łódź
- County: Radomsko
- Gmina: Dobryszyce

Rożny [ˈrɔʐnɨ] is a village in the administrative district of Gmina Dobryszyce, within Radomsko County, Łódź Voivodeship, in central Poland.
