= Czarny Las, Radomsko County =

Czarny Las
- Village
- Location within Poland
- Coordinates: 50°55′51″N 19°44′25″E
- Country: Poland
- Voivodeship: Łódź
- County: Radomsko
- Gmina: Żytno

Czarny Las [ˈt͡ʂarnɨ ˈlas] is a village in the administrative district of Gmina Żytno, within Radomsko County, Łódź Voivodeship, in central Poland.
