= Silniczka =

- Village
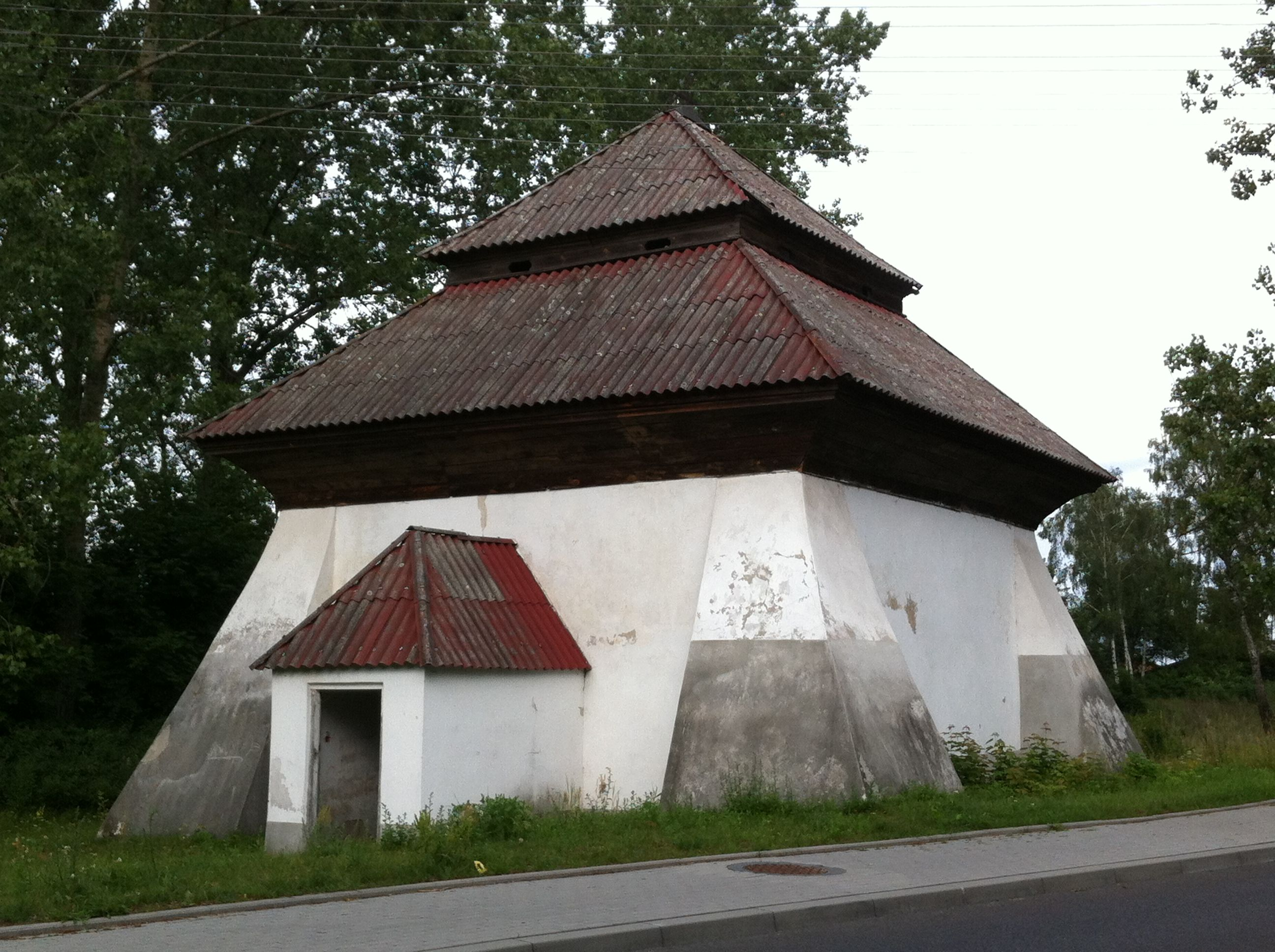

- Location within Poland
- Coordinates: 50°56′N 19°46′E
- Country: Poland
- Voivodeship: Łódź
- County: Radomsko
- Gmina: Żytno

Silniczka [ɕilˈnit͡ʂka] is a village in the administrative district of Gmina Żytno, within Radomsko County, Łódź Voivodeship, in central Poland. It has a population of approximately 60 people.
