= Brzeziny, Radomsko County =

Brzeziny
- Village
- Location within Poland
- Coordinates: 50°55′34″N 19°44′29″E
- Country: Poland
- Voivodeship: Łódź
- County: Radomsko
- Gmina: Żytno

Brzeziny [bʐɛˈʑinɨ] is a village in the administrative district of Gmina Żytno, within Radomsko County, Łódź Voivodeship, in central Poland.
