= Wymysłów, Gmina Żytno =

Wymysłów
- Village
- Location within Poland
- Coordinates: 50°56′21″N 19°41′34″E
- Country: Poland
- Voivodeship: Łódź
- County: Radomsko
- Gmina: Żytno

Wymysłów [vɨˈmɨswuf] is a village in the administrative district of Gmina Żytno, within Radomsko County, Łódź Voivodeship, in central Poland.
