= Pągów =

Pągów may refer to the following places:

- Pągów, Radomsko County in Łódź Voivodeship (central Poland)
- Pągów, Rawa County in Łódź Voivodeship (central Poland)
- Pągów, Opole Voivodeship (south-west Poland)
