= Gałkowice Nowe =

- Village
- Location within Poland
- Coordinates: 51°14′35″N 19°26′51″E
- Country: Poland
- Voivodeship: Łódź
- County: Radomsko
- Gmina: Kamieńsk

Gałkowice Nowe [ɡau̯kɔˈvit͡sɛ ˈnɔvɛ] is a village in the administrative district of Gmina Kamieńsk, within Radomsko County, Łódź Voivodeship, in central Poland.
