= Kozia Woda =

- Village
- Location within Poland
- Coordinates: 51°5′51″N 19°19′44″E
- Country: Poland
- Voivodeship: Łódź
- County: Radomsko
- Gmina: Ładzice
- Population: 50

Kozia Woda [ˈkɔʑa ˈvɔda] is a village in the administrative district of Gmina Ładzice, within Radomsko County, Łódź Voivodeship, in central Poland.
