= Szpinalów =

- Village
- Location within Poland
- Coordinates: 51°14′N 19°29′E
- Country: Poland
- Voivodeship: Łódź
- County: Radomsko
- Gmina: Kamieńsk
- Population: 100

Szpinalów [ʂpiˈnaluf] is a village in the administrative district of Gmina Kamieńsk, within Radomsko County, Łódź Voivodeship, in central Poland.
