= Kolonia Olszowiec =

- Village
- Location within Poland
- Coordinates: 51°11′38″N 19°31′26″E
- Country: Poland
- Voivodeship: Łódź
- County: Radomsko
- Gmina: Kamieńsk

Kolonia Olszowiec [kɔˈlɔɲa ɔlˈʂɔvjɛt͡s] is a village in the administrative district of Gmina Kamieńsk, within Radomsko County, Łódź Voivodeship, in central Poland.
