= Koźniewice =

- Village
- Location within Poland
- Coordinates: 51°12′14″N 19°28′14″E
- Country: Poland
- Voivodeship: Łódź
- County: Radomsko
- Gmina: Kamieńsk

Koźniewice [kɔʑɲɛˈvit͡sɛ] is a village in the administrative district of Gmina Kamieńsk, within Radomsko County, Łódź Voivodeship, in central Poland.
