= Długie, Radomsko County =

Długie
- Village
- Location within Poland
- Coordinates: 51°7′45″N 19°21′0″E
- Country: Poland
- Voivodeship: Łódź
- County: Radomsko
- Gmina: Lgota Wielka

Długie [ˈdwuɡʲɛ] is a village in the administrative district of Gmina Lgota Wielka, within Radomsko County, Łódź Voivodeship, in central Poland.
