= Włodzimierz, Radomsko County =

Włodzimierz
- Village
- Location within Poland
- Coordinates: 51°15′39″N 19°28′22″E
- Country: Poland
- Voivodeship: Łódź
- County: Radomsko
- Gmina: Kamieńsk

Włodzimierz [vwɔˈd͡ʑimjɛʂ] is a village in the administrative district of Gmina Kamieńsk, within Radomsko County, Łódź Voivodeship, in central Poland.
