= Sudzin =

- Village
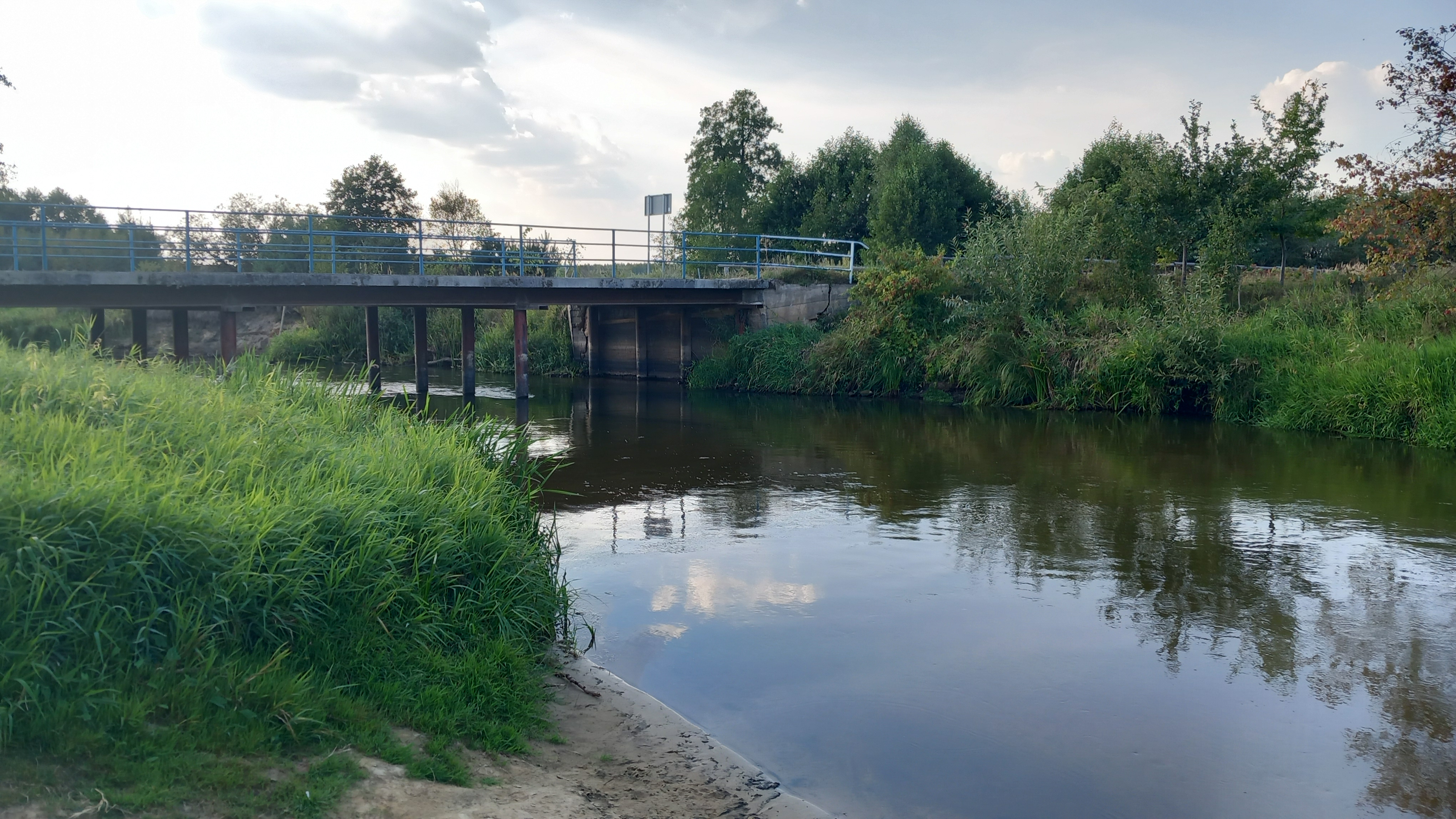

- Location within Poland
- Coordinates: 50°56′N 19°51′E
- Country: Poland
- Voivodeship: Łódź
- County: Radomsko
- Gmina: Żytno

Sudzin [ˈsud͡ʑin] is a village in the administrative district of Gmina Żytno, within Radomsko County, Łódź Voivodeship, in central Poland.
