= Jatno =

- Village
- Location within Poland
- Coordinates: 50°51′03″N 19°40′31″E
- Country: Poland
- Voivodeship: Łódź
- County: Radomsko
- Gmina: Żytno

Jatno [ˈjatnɔ] is a village in the administrative district of Gmina Żytno, within Radomsko County, Łódź Voivodeship, in central Poland.
