= Blok Dobryszyce =

- Village
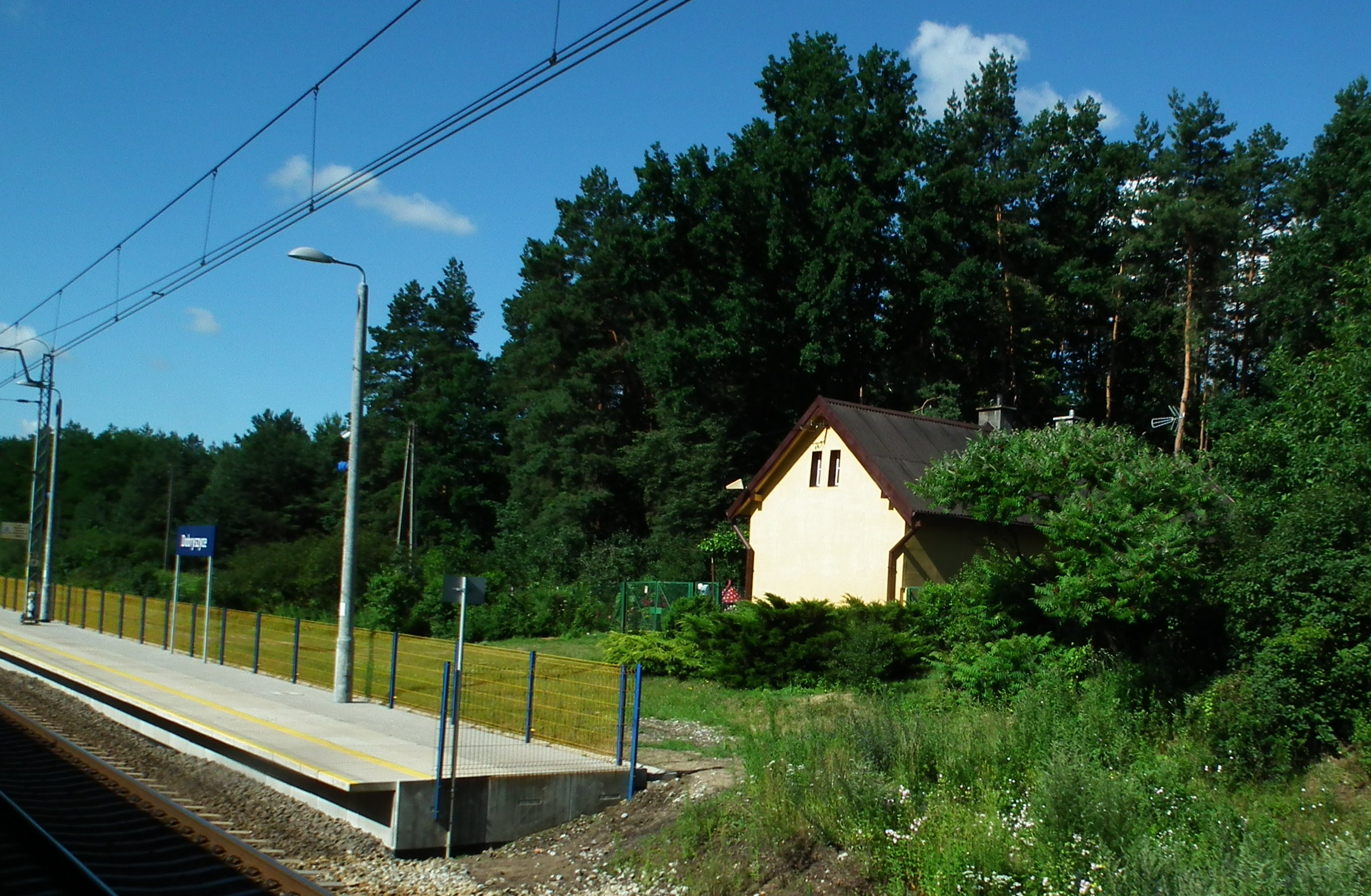

- Location within Poland
- Coordinates: 51°7′28″N 19°27′0″E
- Country: Poland
- Voivodeship: Łódź
- County: Radomsko
- Gmina: Dobryszyce
- Population (approx.): 1,250
- Website: http://www.dobryszyce.i-bip.pl/

Blok Dobryszyce [ˈblɔk dɔbrɨˈʂɨt͡sɛ] is a village in the administrative district of Gmina Dobryszyce, within Radomsko County, Łódź Voivodeship, in central Poland.

The village has an approximate population of 1,250.
