= Grodzisko, Radomsko County =

Grodzisko
- Village
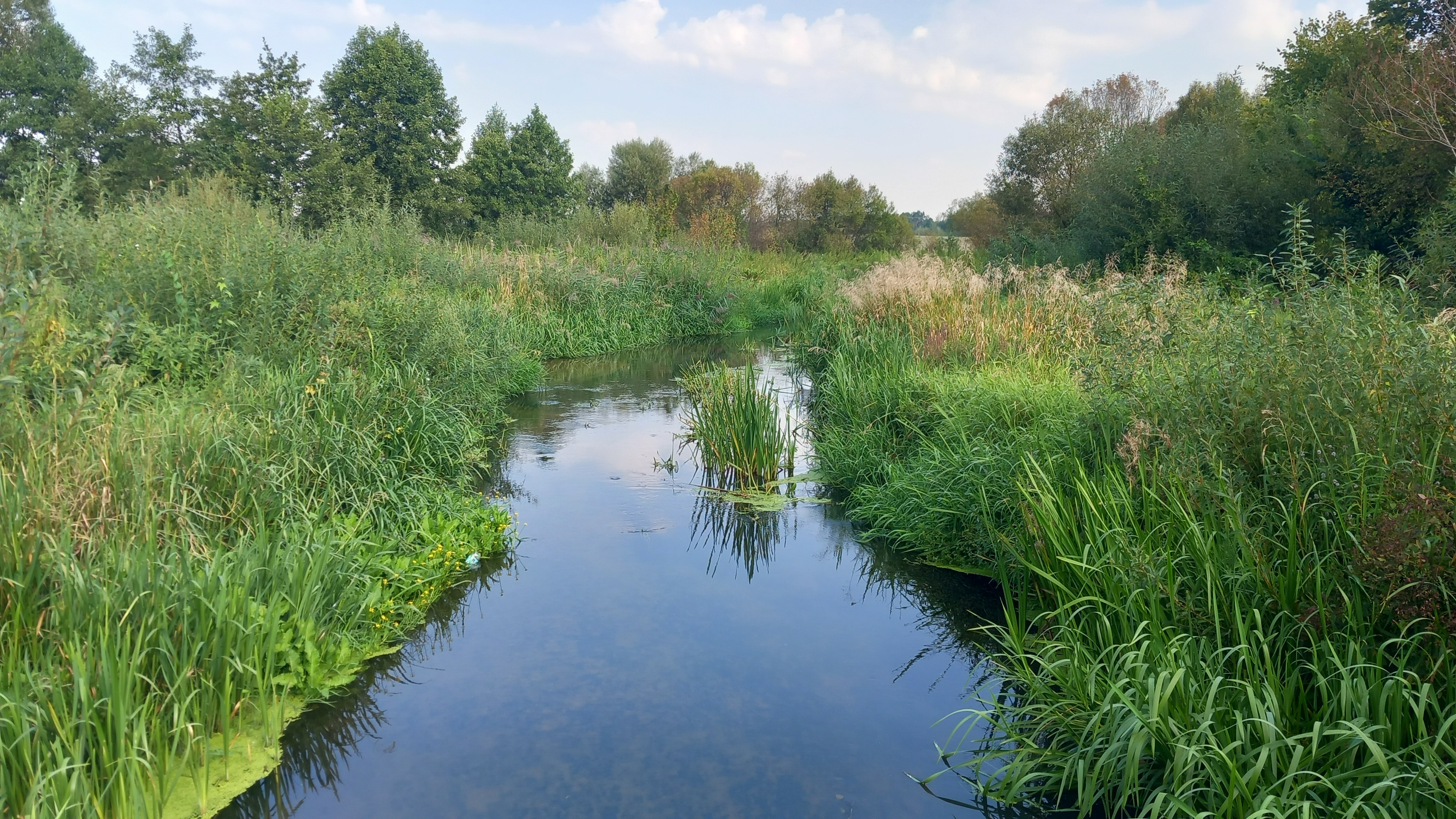

- Location within Poland
- Coordinates: 50°51′17″N 19°42′21″E
- Country: Poland
- Voivodeship: Łódź
- County: Radomsko
- Gmina: Żytno

Grodzisko [ɡrɔˈd͡ʑiskɔ] is a village in the administrative district of Gmina Żytno, within Radomsko County, Łódź Voivodeship, in central Poland.
