= Zalesiczki =

- Village
- Location within Poland
- Coordinates: 51°10′N 19°25′E
- Country: Poland
- Voivodeship: Łódź
- County: Radomsko
- Gmina: Dobryszyce

Zalesiczki [zalɛˈɕit͡ʂki] is a village in the administrative district of Gmina Dobryszyce, within Radomsko County, Łódź Voivodeship, in central Poland.
