= Jankowice, Radomsko County =

Jankowice
- Village
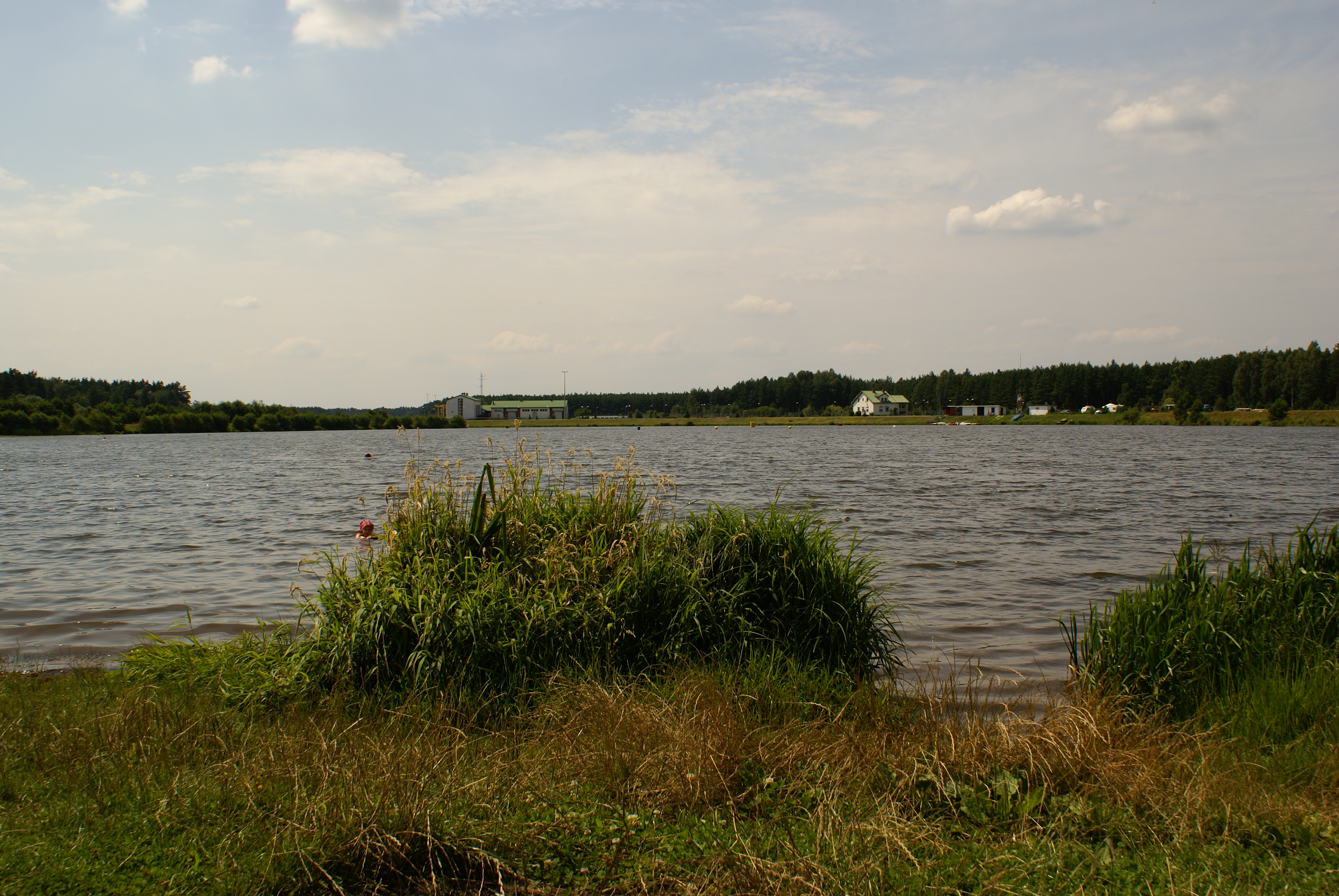

- Location within Poland
- Coordinates: 51°2′N 19°16′E
- Country: Poland
- Voivodeship: Łódź
- County: Radomsko
- Gmina: Ładzice

Jankowice [jankɔˈvit͡sɛ] is a village in the administrative district of Gmina Ładzice, within Radomsko County, Łódź Voivodeship, in central Poland.
