= Folwark (disambiguation) =

A folwark was a large Polish farm.

Folwark may also refer to the following villages in Poland:

- Folwark, Gniezno County in Greater Poland Voivodeship (west-central Poland)
- Folwark, Rawicz County in Greater Poland Voivodeship (west-central Poland)
- Folwark, Łódź Voivodeship (central Poland)
- Folwark, Otwock County in Masovian Voivodeship (east-central Poland)
- Folwark, Opole Voivodeship (south-west Poland)
- Folwark, Pomeranian Voivodeship (north Poland)
