= Ruda, Gmina Dobryszyce =

Ruda
- Village
- Location within Poland
- Coordinates: 51°8′49″N 19°27′26″E
- Country: Poland
- Voivodeship: Łódź
- County: Radomsko
- Gmina: Dobryszyce

Ruda [ˈruda] is a village in the administrative district of Gmina Dobryszyce, within Radomsko County, Łódź Voivodeship, in central Poland.
