= Polichno, Radomsko County =

Polichno
- Village
- Location within Poland
- Coordinates: 50°55′29″N 19°43′0″E
- Country: Poland
- Voivodeship: Łódź
- County: Radomsko
- Gmina: Żytno

Polichno [pɔˈlixnɔ] is a village in the administrative district of Gmina Żytno, within Radomsko County, Łódź Voivodeship, in central Poland.
