= Siódemka, Łódź Voivodeship =

Siódemka
- Village
- Location within Poland
- Coordinates: 51°16′24″N 19°29′12″E
- Country: Poland
- Voivodeship: Łódź
- County: Radomsko
- Gmina: Kamieńsk

Siódemka [ɕuˈdɛmka] is a village in the administrative district of Gmina Kamieńsk, within Radomsko County, Łódź Voivodeship, in central Poland.
