= Kępa, Łódź Voivodeship =

Kępa
- Village
- Location within Poland
- Coordinates: 50°54′47″N 19°41′45″E
- Country: Poland
- Voivodeship: Łódź
- County: Radomsko
- Gmina: Żytno

Kępa [ˈkɛmpa] is a village in the administrative district of Gmina Żytno, within Radomsko County, Łódź Voivodeship, in central Poland.
