= Woźniki, Radomsko County =

Woźniki
- Village
- Location within Poland
- Coordinates: 51°8′34″N 19°21′46″E
- Country: Poland
- Voivodeship: Łódź
- County: Radomsko
- Gmina: Lgota Wielka

Woźniki [vɔʑˈniki] is a village in the administrative district of Gmina Lgota Wielka, within Radomsko County, Łódź Voivodeship, in central Poland.
