= Brodowe =

- Village
- Location within Poland
- Coordinates: 51°3′7″N 19°21′33″E
- Country: Poland
- Voivodeship: Łódź
- County: Radomsko
- Gmina: Ładzice
- Population: 60

Brodowe [brɔˈdɔvɛ] is a village in the administrative district of Gmina Ładzice, within Radomsko County, Łódź Voivodeship, in central Poland.
