= Tomaszów, Radomsko County =

Settlement in Gmina Ładzice, Poland

Tomaszów
- Settlement
- Location within Poland
- Coordinates: 51°06′24″N 19°25′00″E
- Country: Poland
- Voivodeship: Łódź
- County: Radomsko
- Gmina: Ładzice

Tomaszów [tɔˈmaʂuf] is a settlement in the administrative district of Gmina Ładzice, within Radomsko County, Łódź Voivodeship, in central Poland.
