= Łazów, Radomsko County =

Łazów
- Village
- Location within Poland
- Coordinates: 50°56′34″N 19°45′3″E
- Country: Poland
- Voivodeship: Łódź
- County: Radomsko
- Gmina: Żytno

Łazów [ˈwazuf] is a village in the administrative district of Gmina Żytno, within Radomsko County, Łódź Voivodeship, in central Poland.
