= Jedlno Pierwsze =

- Village
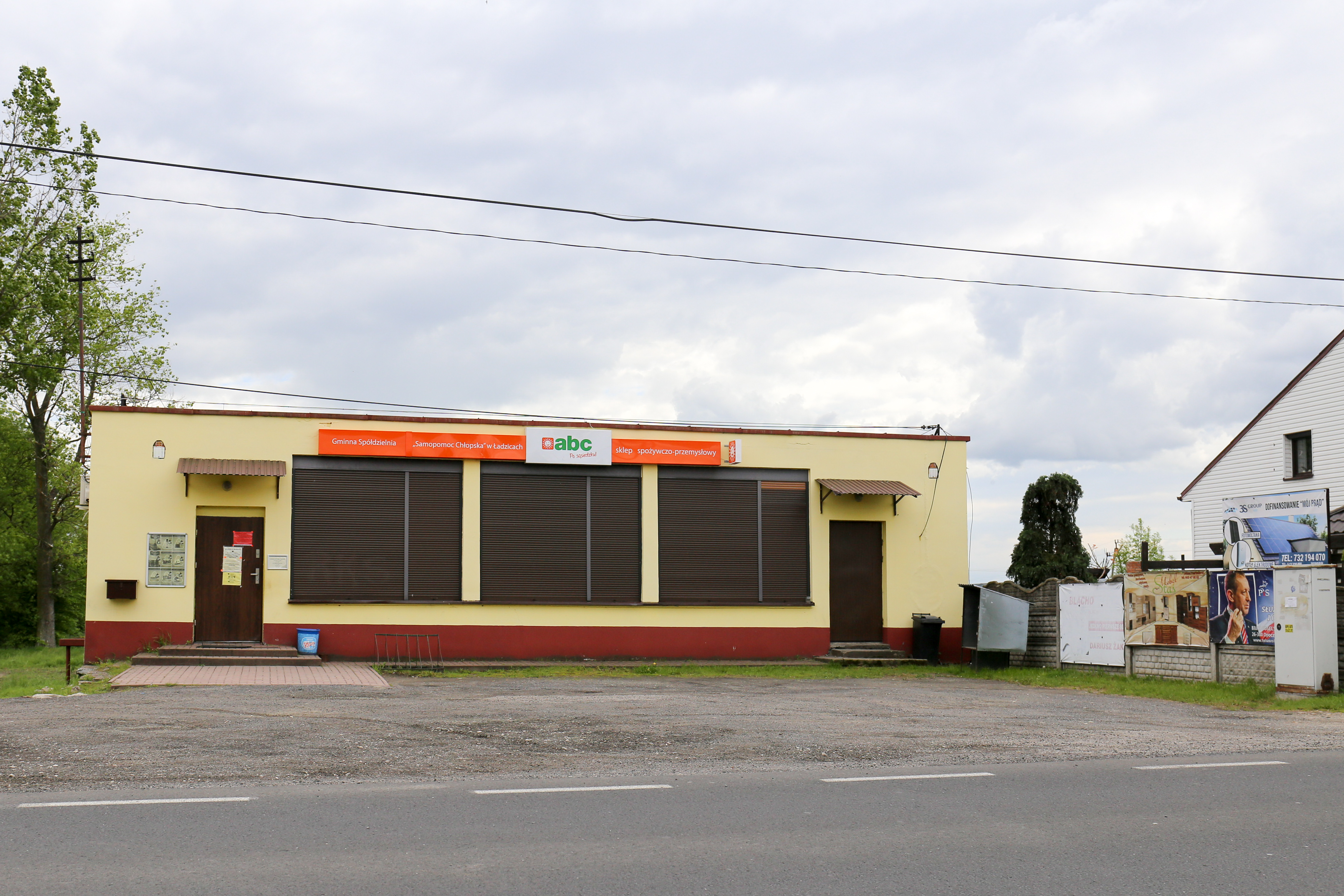

- Location within Poland
- Coordinates: 51°5′0″N 19°15′0″E
- Country: Poland
- Voivodeship: Łódź
- County: Radomsko
- Gmina: Ładzice
- Population: 410

Jedlno Pierwsze [ˈjɛdlnɔ ˈpjɛrfʂɛ] is a village in the administrative district of Gmina Ładzice, within Radomsko County, Łódź Voivodeship, in central Poland.
