= Galonki, Łódź Voivodeship =

Galonki
- Village
- Location within Poland
- Coordinates: 51°7′59″N 19°24′2″E
- Country: Poland
- Voivodeship: Łódź
- County: Radomsko
- Gmina: Dobryszyce

Galonki [ɡaˈlɔnki] is a village in the administrative district of Gmina Dobryszyce, within Radomsko County, Łódź Voivodeship, in central Poland.
