= Zakrzówek Szlachecki =

- Village
- Location within Poland
- Coordinates: 51°3′N 19°13′E
- Country: Poland
- Voivodeship: Łódź
- County: Radomsko
- Gmina: Ładzice

Zakrzówek Szlachecki (Polish pronunciation: [zaˈkʂuvɛk ʂlaˈxɛtskʲi]) is a village in the administrative district of Gmina Ładzice, within Radomsko County, Łódź Voivodeship, in central Poland.
