= Budzów, Łódź Voivodeship =

Budzów
- Village
- Location within Poland
- Coordinates: 50°54′14″N 19°44′27″E
- Country: Poland
- Voivodeship: Łódź
- County: Radomsko
- Gmina: Żytno

Budzów [ˈbud͡zuf] is a village in the administrative district of Gmina Żytno, within Radomsko County, Łódź Voivodeship, in central Poland.
