= Kolonia Lgota =

Kolonia Lgota, Poland
- Village
- Location within Poland
- Coordinates: 51°8′50″N 19°18′32″E
- Country: Poland
- Voivodeship: Łódź
- County: Radomsko
- Gmina: Lgota Wielka

Kolonia Lgota [kɔˈlɔɲa ˈlɡɔta] is a village in the administrative district of Gmina Lgota Wielka, within Radomsko County, Łódź Voivodeship, in central Poland.
