= Dąbrowa, Radomsko County =

Dąbrowa
- Village
- Location within Poland
- Coordinates: 51°14′10″N 19°31′07″E
- Country: Poland
- Voivodeship: Łódź
- County: Radomsko
- Gmina: Kamieńsk

Dąbrowa [dɔmˈbrɔva] is a village in the administrative district of Gmina Kamieńsk, within Radomsko County, Łódź Voivodeship, in central Poland.
