= Huby Ruszczyńskie =

- Village
- Location within Poland
- Coordinates: 51°14′9″N 19°26′4″E
- Country: Poland
- Voivodeship: Łódź
- County: Radomsko
- Gmina: Kamieńsk

Huby Ruszczyńskie [ˈxubɨ ruʂˈt͡ʂɨɲskʲɛ] is a village in the administrative district of Gmina Kamieńsk, within Radomsko County, Łódź Voivodeship, in central Poland.
