= Pławidła =

- Village
- Location within Poland
- Coordinates: 50°56′51″N 19°39′6″E
- Country: Poland
- Voivodeship: Łódź
- County: Radomsko
- Gmina: Żytno

Pławidła [pwaˈvidwa] is a village in the administrative district of Gmina Żytno, within Radomsko County, Łódź Voivodeship, in central Poland.
