= Czechowiec =

- Village
- Location within Poland
- Coordinates: 50°52′N 19°41′E
- Country: Poland
- Voivodeship: Łódź
- County: Radomsko
- Gmina: Żytno

Czechowiec [t͡ʂɛˈxɔvjɛt͡s] is a village in the administrative district of Gmina Żytno, within Radomsko County, Łódź Voivodeship, in central Poland.
