= Krępa, Radomsko County =

Krępa
- Village
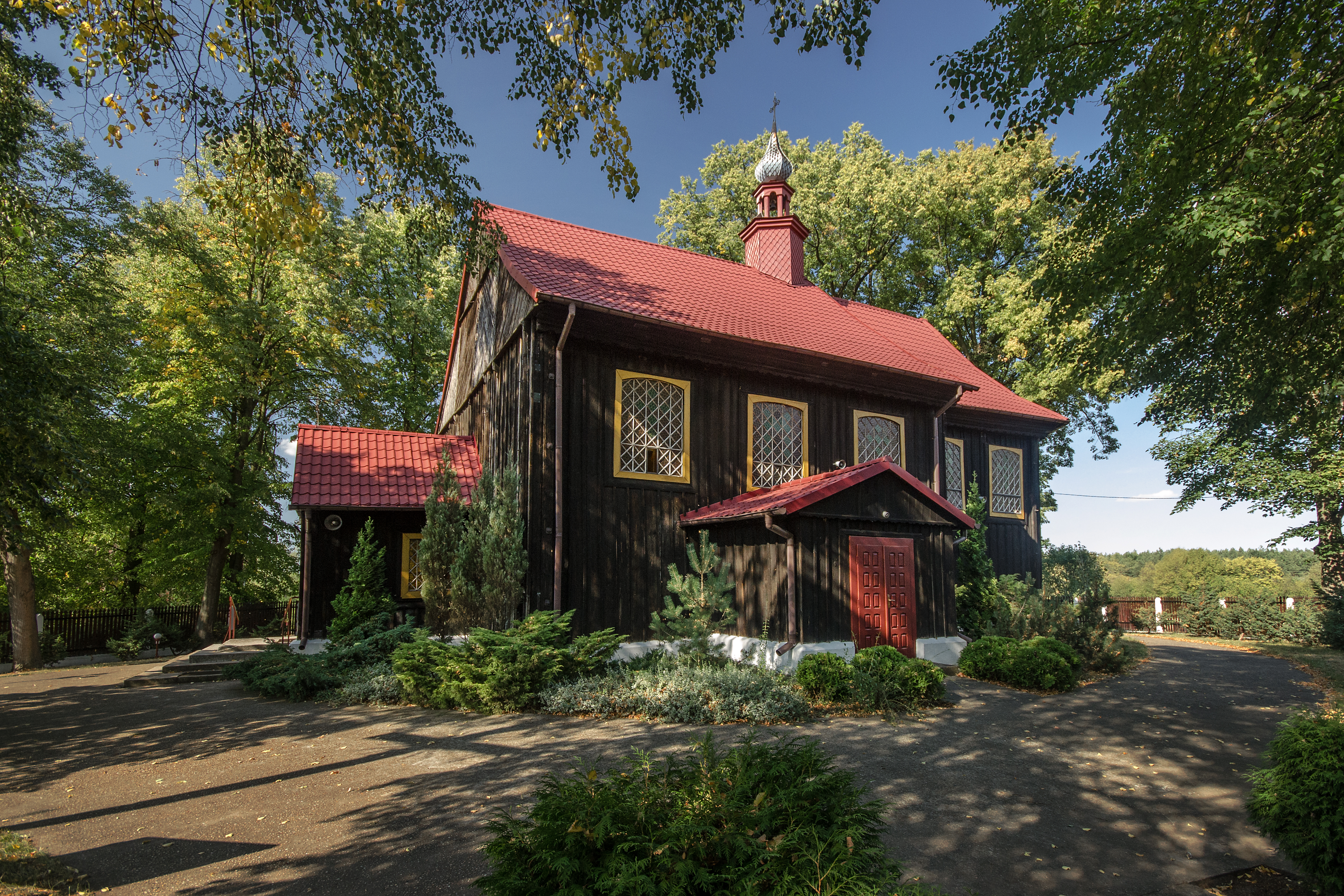
- Catholic church

- Location within Poland
- Coordinates: 51°6′49″N 19°20′11″E
- Country: Poland
- Voivodeship: Łódź
- County: Radomsko
- Gmina: Lgota Wielka

Krępa [ˈkrɛmpa] is a village in the administrative district of Gmina Lgota Wielka, within Radomsko County, Łódź Voivodeship, in central Poland.
