= Fryszerka, Radomsko County =

Fryszerka
- Settlement
- Location within Poland
- Coordinates: 50°55′43″N 19°42′23″E
- Country: Poland
- Voivodeship: Łódź
- County: Radomsko
- Gmina: Żytno

Fryszerka [frɨˈʂɛrka] is a settlement in the administrative district of Gmina Żytno, within Radomsko County, Łódź Voivodeship, in central Poland.
