= Czech, Łódź Voivodeship =

Czech
- Settlement
- Location within Poland
- Coordinates: 50°54′11″N 19°36′06″E
- Country: Poland
- Voivodeship: Łódź
- County: Radomsko
- Gmina: Żytno

Czech [t͡ʂɛx] is a settlement in the administrative district of Gmina Żytno, within Radomsko County, Łódź Voivodeship, in central Poland.
