= Borzykówka =

- Village
- Location within Poland
- Coordinates: 50°53′N 19°40′E
- Country: Poland
- Voivodeship: Łódź
- County: Radomsko
- Gmina: Żytno

Borzykówka [bɔʐɨˈkufka] is a village in the administrative district of Gmina Żytno, within Radomsko County, Łódź Voivodeship, in central Poland.
