= Aleksandrów, Radomsko County =

Aleksandrów
- Village
- Location within Poland
- Coordinates: 51°13′41″N 19°29′29″E
- Country: Poland
- Voivodeship: Łódź
- County: Radomsko
- Gmina: Kamieńsk

Aleksandrów [alɛkˈsandruf] is a village in the administrative district of Gmina Kamieńsk, within Radomsko County, Łódź Voivodeship, in central Poland.
