= Rędziny, Łódź Voivodeship =

Rędziny
- Village
- Location within Poland
- Coordinates: 50°58′21″N 19°37′40″E
- Country: Poland
- Voivodeship: Łódź
- County: Radomsko
- Gmina: Żytno

Rędziny [rɛnˈd͡ʑinɨ] is a village in the administrative district of Gmina Żytno, within Radomsko County, Łódź Voivodeship, in central Poland.
