= Stobiecko Szlacheckie =

- Village
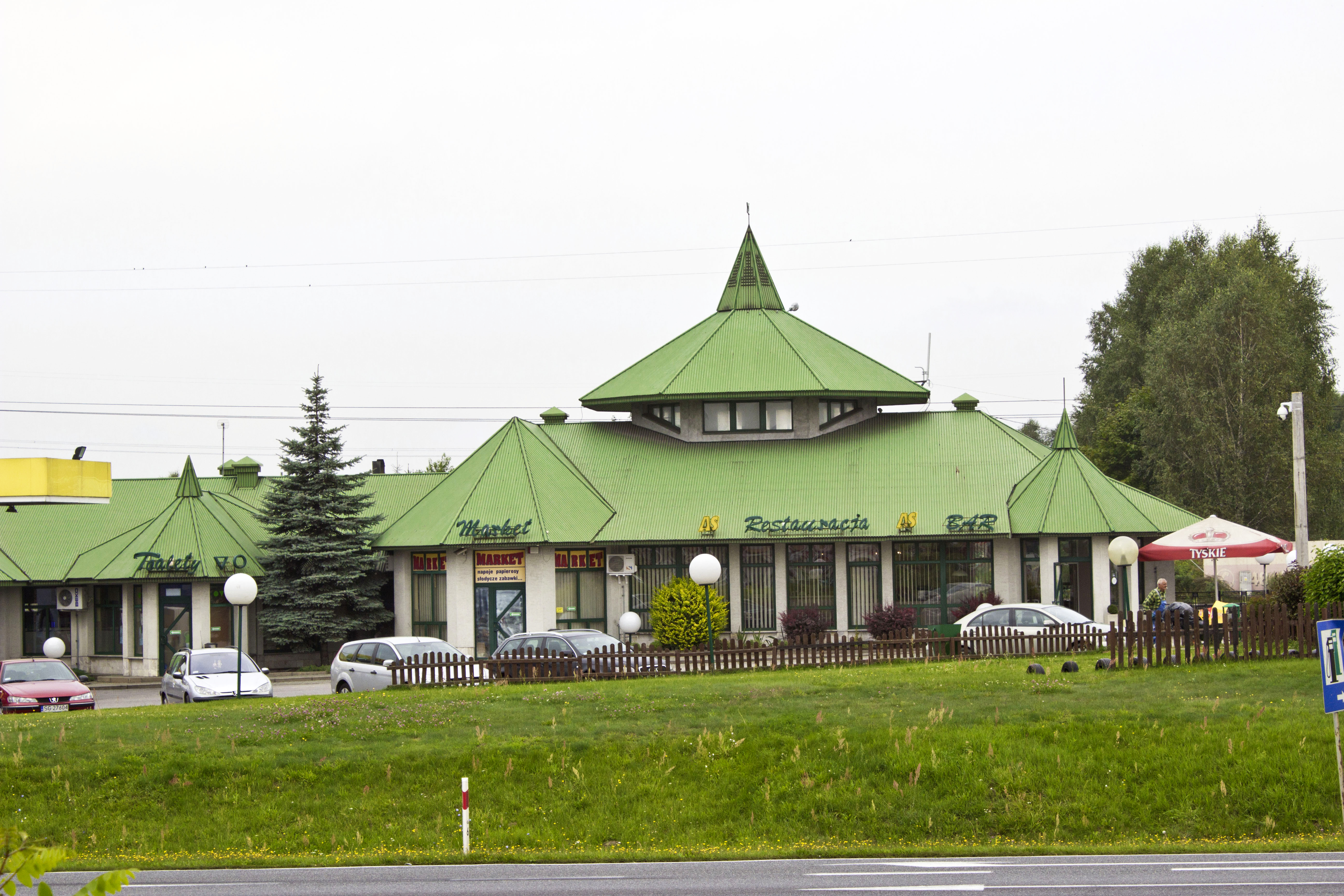

- Location within Poland
- Coordinates: 51°6′N 19°24′E
- Country: Poland
- Voivodeship: Łódź
- County: Radomsko
- Gmina: Ładzice

Stobiecko Szlacheckie [stɔˈbjɛt͡skɔ ʂlaˈxɛt͡skʲɛ] is a village in the administrative district of Gmina Ładzice, within Radomsko County, Łódź Voivodeship, in central Poland.
