= Kozie Pole =

- Village
- Location within Poland
- Coordinates: 50°57′10″N 19°43′8″E
- Country: Poland
- Voivodeship: Łódź
- County: Radomsko
- Gmina: Żytno

Kozie Pole [ˈkɔʑɛ ˈpɔlɛ] is a village in the administrative district of Gmina Żytno, within Radomsko County, Łódź Voivodeship, in central Poland.
