= Ruszczyn =

- Village
- Location within Poland
- Coordinates: 51°13′25″N 19°24′08″E
- Country: Poland
- Voivodeship: Łódź
- County: Radomsko
- Gmina: Kamieńsk

Ruszczyn [ˈruʂt͡ʂɨn] is a village in the administrative district of Gmina Kamieńsk, within Radomsko County, Łódź Voivodeship, in central Poland.
