= Radziechowice Drugie =

- Village
- Location within Poland
- Coordinates: 51°4′N 19°21′E
- Country: Poland
- Voivodeship: Łódź
- County: Radomsko
- Gmina: Ładzice

Radziechowice Drugie [rad͡ʑɛxɔˈvit͡sɛ ˈdruɡʲɛ] is a village in the administrative district of Gmina Ładzice, within Radomsko County, Łódź Voivodeship, in central Poland.
