= Rogaczówek =

- Village
- Location within Poland
- Coordinates: 50°55′N 19°39′E
- Country: Poland
- Voivodeship: Łódź
- County: Radomsko
- Gmina: Żytno
- Website: http://www.zytno.rsko.net/

Rogaczówek [rɔɡaˈt͡ʂuvɛk] is a village in the administrative district of Gmina Żytno, within Radomsko County, Łódź Voivodeship, in central Poland.
