= Gorzędów =

- Village
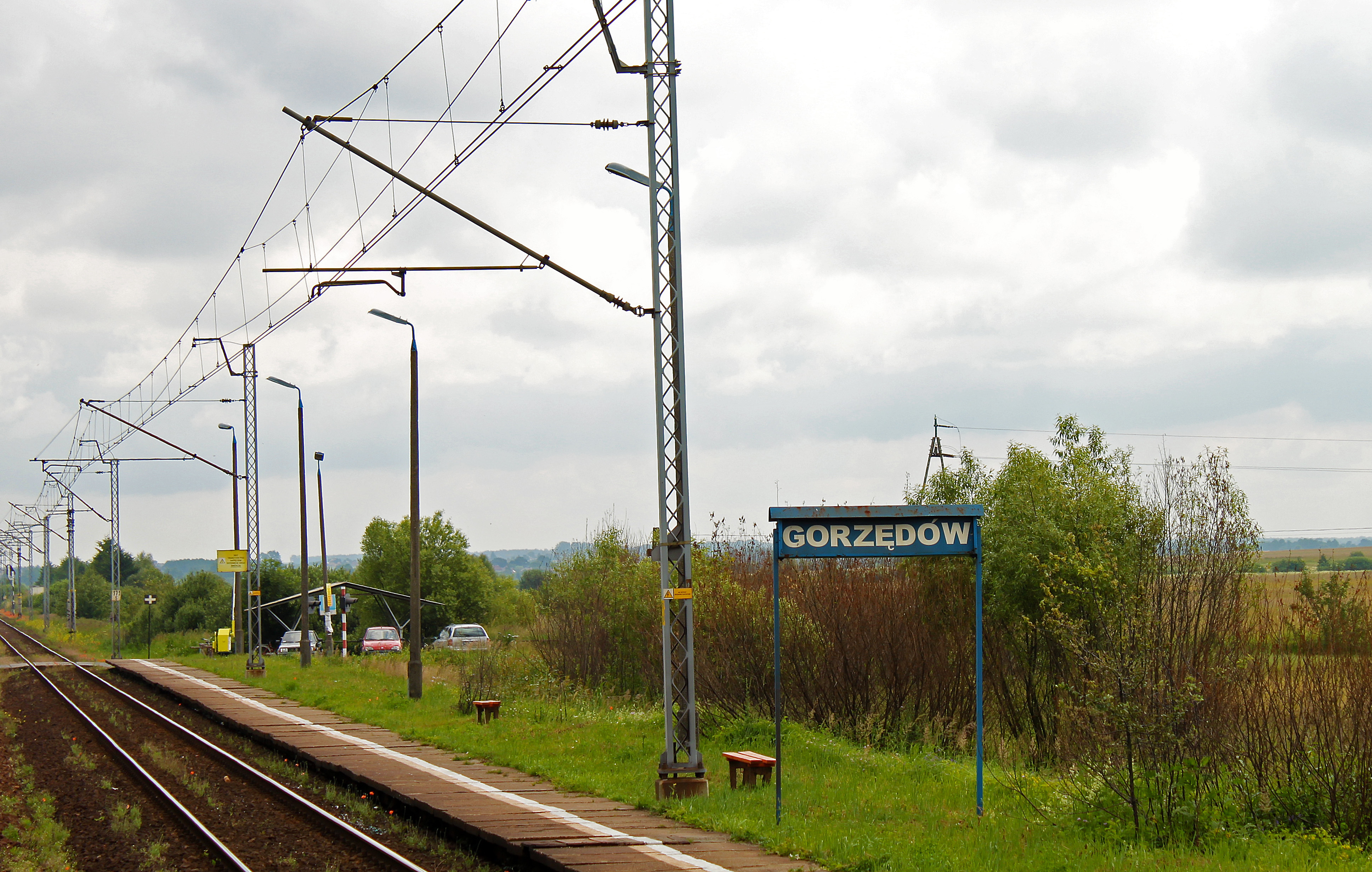
- Railway stop

- Location within Poland
- Coordinates: 51°12′35″N 19°32′51″E
- Country: Poland
- Voivodeship: Łódź
- County: Radomsko
- Gmina: Kamieńsk
- Population: 832

Gorzędów [ɡɔˈʐɛnduf] is a village in the administrative district of Gmina Kamieńsk, within Radomsko County, Łódź Voivodeship, in central Poland.
