= Wiewiórów, Gmina Lgota Wielka =

Wiewiórów
- Village
- Location within Poland
- Coordinates: 51°9′38″N 19°20′4″E
- Country: Poland
- Voivodeship: Łódź
- County: Radomsko
- Gmina: Lgota Wielka

Wiewiórów [vjɛˈvjuruf] is a village in the administrative district of Gmina Lgota Wielka, within Radomsko County, Łódź Voivodeship, in central Poland.
