= Brudzice =

- Village
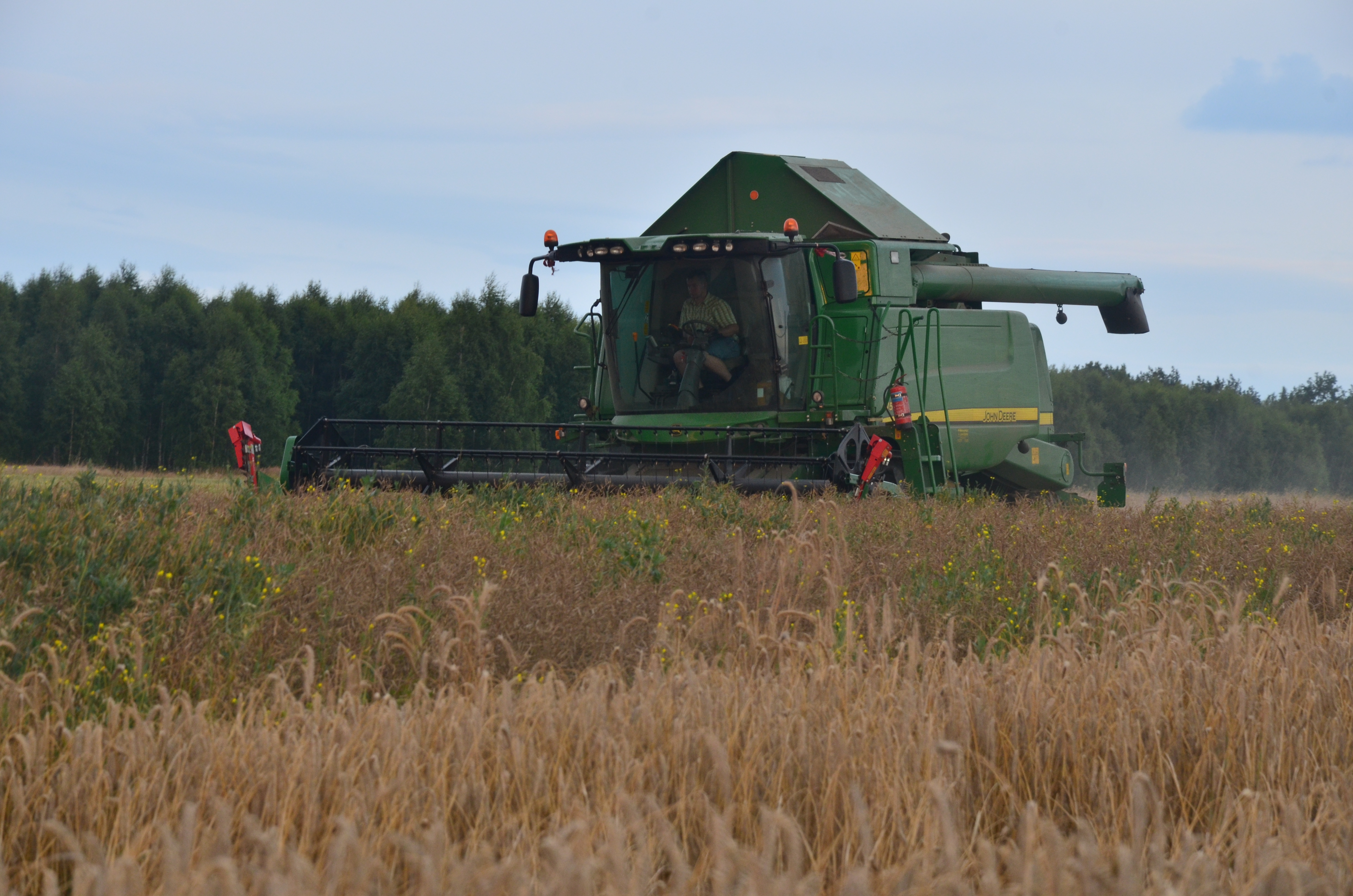

- Location within Poland
- Coordinates: 51°10′N 19°20′E
- Country: Poland
- Voivodeship: Łódź
- County: Radomsko
- Gmina: Lgota Wielka
- Population: 874

Brudzice [bruˈd͡ʑit͡sɛ] is a village in the administrative district of Gmina Lgota Wielka, within Radomsko County, Łódź Voivodeship, in central Poland.
