= Ferdynandów, Radomsko County =

Ferdynandów
- Village
- Location within Poland
- Coordinates: 50°57′38″N 19°44′6″E
- Country: Poland
- Voivodeship: Łódź
- County: Radomsko
- Gmina: Żytno
- Population: 36

Ferdynandów [fɛrdɨˈnanduf] is a village in the administrative district of Gmina Żytno, within Radomsko County, Łódź Voivodeship, in central Poland.
