= Gmina Dobryszyce =

Gmina Dobryszyce Dobryszyce Commune
- Gmina
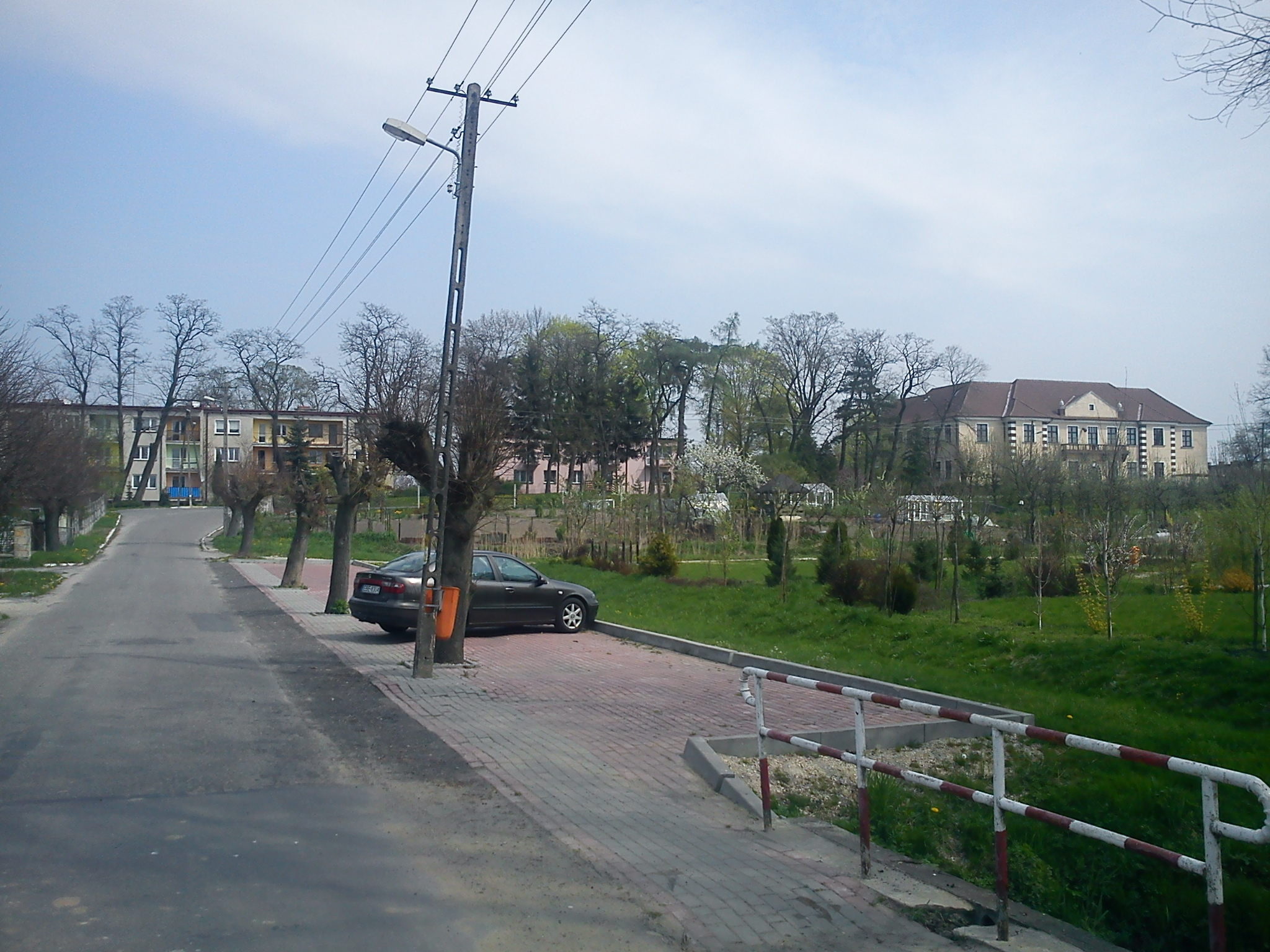

- Coat of arms
- Interactive map of Gmina Dobryszyce
- Coordinates (Dobryszyce): 51°8′43″N 19°24′22″E
- Country: Poland
- Voivodeship: Łódź
- County: Radomsko
- Seat: Dobryszyce

Area
  - Total: 51.1 km^{2} (19.7 sq mi)

Population (2006)
  - Total: 4,184
  - Density: 81.9/km^{2} (212/sq mi)
- Time zone: UTC+1 (CET)
  - Summer (DST): UTC+2 (CEST)
- Website: www.dobryszyce.pl

Gmina Dobryszyce is a rural gmina (administrative district) in Radomsko County, Łódź Voivodeship, in central Poland. Its seat is the village of Dobryszyce, which lies approximately 10 kilometres (6 mi) north of Radomsko and 71 km (44 mi) south of the regional capital Łódź.

The gmina covers an area of 51.1 square kilometres (19.7 sq mi), and as of 2006 its total population is 4,184.

== Villages ==
Gmina Dobryszyce contains the villages and settlements of:

- Blok Dobryszyce
- Borowa
- Borowiecko
- Dobryszyce
- Galonki
- Rożny
- Ruda
- Wiewiórów
- Żaby
- Zalesiczki

== Neighbouring gminas ==
Gmina Dobryszyce is bordered by the town of Radomsko and by the gminas of Gomunice, Kamieńsk, Kleszczów, Ładzice, Lgota Wielka and Radomsko.
