= Borzykowa, Łódź Voivodeship =

Borzykowa
- Village
- Location within Poland
- Country: Poland
- Voivodeship: Łódź
- County: Radomsko
- Gmina: Żytno

Borzykowa [bɔʐɨˈkɔva] is a village in the administrative district of Gmina Żytno, within Radomsko County, Łódź Voivodeship, in central Poland.
