= Lgota Wielka, Łódź Voivodeship =

Lgota Wielka
- Village
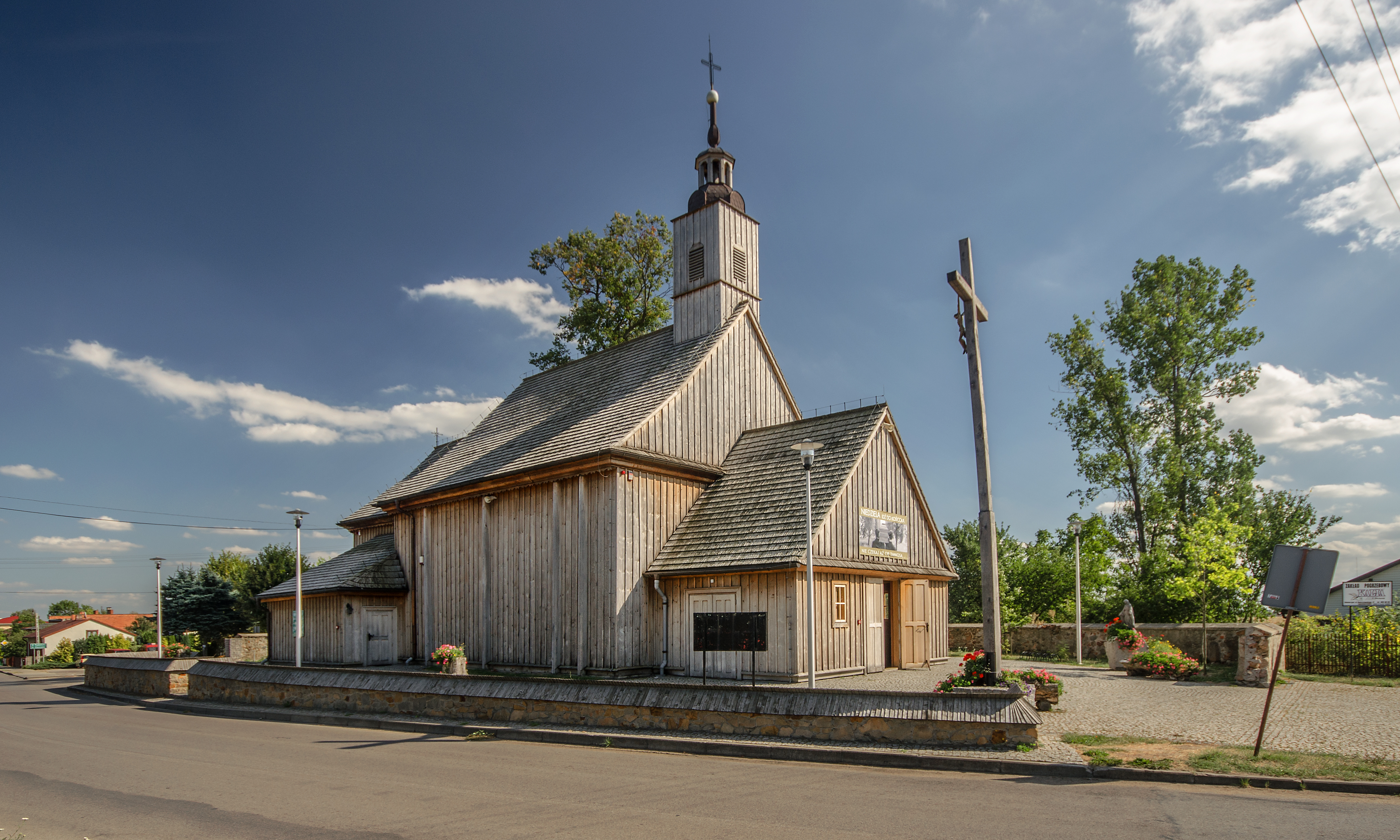
- Catholic church

- Location within Poland
- Coordinates: 51°8′56″N 19°19′54″E
- Country: Poland
- Voivodeship: Łódź
- County: Radomsko
- Gmina: Lgota Wielka
- Population: 636

Lgota Wielka [ˈlɡɔta ˈvjɛlka] is a village in Radomsko County, Łódź Voivodeship, in central Poland. It is the seat of the gmina (administrative district) called Gmina Lgota Wielka.
