= Gmina Kamieńsk =

Gmina Kamieńsk Kamieńsk Commune
- Gmina

- Coat of arms
- Interactive map of Gmina Kamieńsk
- Coordinates (Kamieńsk): 51°12′N 19°30′E
- Country: Poland
- Voivodeship: Łódź
- County: Radomsko
- Seat: Kamieńsk

Area
  - Total: 95.81 km^{2} (36.99 sq mi)

Population (2006)
  - Total: 6,094
  - Density: 63.61/km^{2} (164.7/sq mi)
  - Urban: 2,858
  - Rural: 3,236
- Time zone: UTC+1 (CET)
  - Summer (DST): UTC+2 (CEST)
- Website: www.kamiensk.com.pl/gmina/

Gmina Kamieńsk is an urban-rural gmina (administrative district) in Radomsko County, Łódź Voivodeship, in central Poland. Its seat is the town of Kamieńsk, which lies approximately 16 kilometres (10 mi) north of Radomsko and 65 km (40 mi) south of the regional capital Łódź.

The gmina covers an area of 95.81 square kilometres (37.0 sq mi), and as of 2006 its total population is 6,094 (out of which the population of Kamieńsk amounts to 2,858, and the population of the rural part of the gmina is 3,236).

== Villages ==
Apart from the town of Kamieńsk, Gmina Kamieńsk contains the villages and settlements of:

- Aleksandrów
- Barczkowice
- Dąbrowa
- Danielów
- Gałkowice Nowe
- Gałkowice Stare
- Gorzędów
- Huby Ruszczyńskie
- Huta Porajska
- Kolonia Olszowiec
- Koźniewice
- Michałów
- Napoleonów
- Ochocice
- Ozga
- Podjezioro
- Pytowice
- Ruszczyn
- Siódemka
- Szpinalów
- Włodzimierz

== Neighbouring gminas ==
Gmina Kamieńsk is bordered by the gminas of Bełchatów, Dobryszyce, Gomunice, Gorzkowice, Kleszczów, Rozprza and Wola Krzysztoporska.
