= Folwark, Łódź Voivodeship =

Settlement in Gmina Żytno, Poland

Folwark
- Settlement
- Location within Poland
- Coordinates: 50°53′35″N 19°36′22″E
- Country: Poland
- Voivodeship: Łódź
- County: Radomsko
- Gmina: Żytno

Folwark [ˈfɔlvark] is a settlement in the administrative district of Gmina Żytno, within Radomsko County, Łódź Voivodeship, in central Poland.
