= Sowin, Łódź Voivodeship =

Sowin
- Settlement
- Location within Poland
- Coordinates: 50°54′54″N 19°37′22″E
- Country: Poland
- Voivodeship: Łódź
- County: Radomsko
- Gmina: Żytno

Sowin [ˈsɔvin] is a settlement in the administrative district of Gmina Żytno, within Radomsko County, Łódź Voivodeship, in central Poland.
