= Gmina Żytno =

Gmina Żytno Żytno Commune
- Gmina
- Interactive map of Gmina Żytno
- Coordinates (Żytno): 50°56′N 19°38′E
- Country: Poland
- Voivodeship: Łódź
- County: Radomsko
- Seat: Żytno

Area
  - Total: 197.54 km^{2} (76.27 sq mi)

Population (2006)
  - Total: 5,716
  - Density: 28.94/km^{2} (74.94/sq mi)
- Website: http://www.zytno.pl

Gmina Żytno is a rural gmina (administrative district) in Radomsko County, Łódź Voivodeship, in central Poland. Its seat is the village of Żytno, which lies approximately 20 kilometres (12 mi) south-east of Radomsko and 96 km (60 mi) south of the regional capital Łódź.

The gmina covers an area of 197.54 square kilometres (76.3 sq mi), and as of 2006 its total population is 5,716.

== Villages ==
Gmina Żytno contains the villages and settlements of Barycz, Borzykowa, Borzykówka, Brzeziny, Budzów, Bugaj, Ciężkowiczki, Czarny Las, Czech, Czechowiec, Ewina, Ferdynandów, Folwark, Fryszerka, Grodzisko, Ignaców, Jacków, Jatno, Kąty, Kępa, Kolonia Czechowiec, Kozie Pole, Łazów, Magdalenki, Mała Wieś, Maluszyn, Mosty, Nurek, Pągów, Pierzaki, Pławidła, Polichno, Pukarzów, Rędziny, Rędziny-Kolonia, Rogaczówek, Sady, Sekursko, Silnica, Silniczka, Sowin, Sudzin, Sudzinek, Turznia, Wymysłów, Załawie and Żytno.

== Neighbouring gminas ==
Gmina Żytno is bordered by the gminas of Dąbrowa Zielona, Gidle, Kluczewsko, Kobiele Wielkie, Koniecpol, Wielgomłyny and Włoszczowa.
