= Gmina Lgota Wielka =

Gmina Lgota Wielka Lgota Wielka Commune
- Gmina
- Interactive map of Gmina Lgota Wielka
- Coordinates (Lgota Wielka): 51°8′56″N 19°19′54″E
- Country: Poland
- Voivodeship: Łódź
- County: Radomsko
- Seat: Lgota Wielka

Area
  - Total: 63.08 km^{2} (24.36 sq mi)

Population (2006)
  - Total: 4,472
  - Density: 70.89/km^{2} (183.6/sq mi)

Gmina Lgota Wielka is a rural gmina (administrative district) in Radomsko County, Łódź Voivodeship, in central Poland. Its seat is the village of Lgota Wielka, which lies approximately 13 kilometres (8 mi) north-west of Radomsko and 72 km (45 mi) south of the regional capital Łódź.

The gmina covers an area of 63.08 square kilometres (24.4 sq mi), and as of 2006 its total population is 4,472.

== Villages ==
Gmina Lgota Wielka contains the villages and settlements of Brudzice, Długie, Kolonia Lgota, Krępa, Krzywanice, Lgota Wielka, Wiewiórów, Wola Blakowa and Woźniki.

== Neighbouring gminas ==
Gmina Lgota Wielka is bordered by the gminas of Dobryszyce, Kleszczów, Ładzice, Strzelce Wielkie and Sulmierzyce.
