= Nurek, Łódź Voivodeship =

Nurek
- Settlement
- Location within Poland
- Coordinates: 50°57′8″N 19°39′29″E
- Country: Poland
- Voivodeship: Łódź
- County: Radomsko
- Gmina: Żytno

Nurek [ˈnurɛk] is a settlement in the administrative district of Gmina Żytno, within Radomsko County, Łódź Voivodeship, in central Poland.
