= Żaby, Łódź Voivodeship =

Żaby
- Village
- Location within Poland
- Coordinates: 51°10′20″N 19°24′34″E
- Country: Poland
- Voivodeship: Łódź
- County: Radomsko
- Gmina: Dobryszyce

Żaby [ˈʐabɨ] is a village in the administrative district of Gmina Dobryszyce, within Radomsko County, Łódź Voivodeship, in central Poland.
