= Pągów, Radomsko County =

Pągów
- Village
- Location within Poland
- Coordinates: 50°54′15″N 19°42′2″E
- Country: Poland
- Voivodeship: Łódź
- County: Radomsko
- Gmina: Żytno

Pągów [ˈpɔŋɡuf] is a village in the administrative district of Gmina Żytno, within Radomsko County, Łódź Voivodeship, in central Poland.
