= Żytno =

- Village
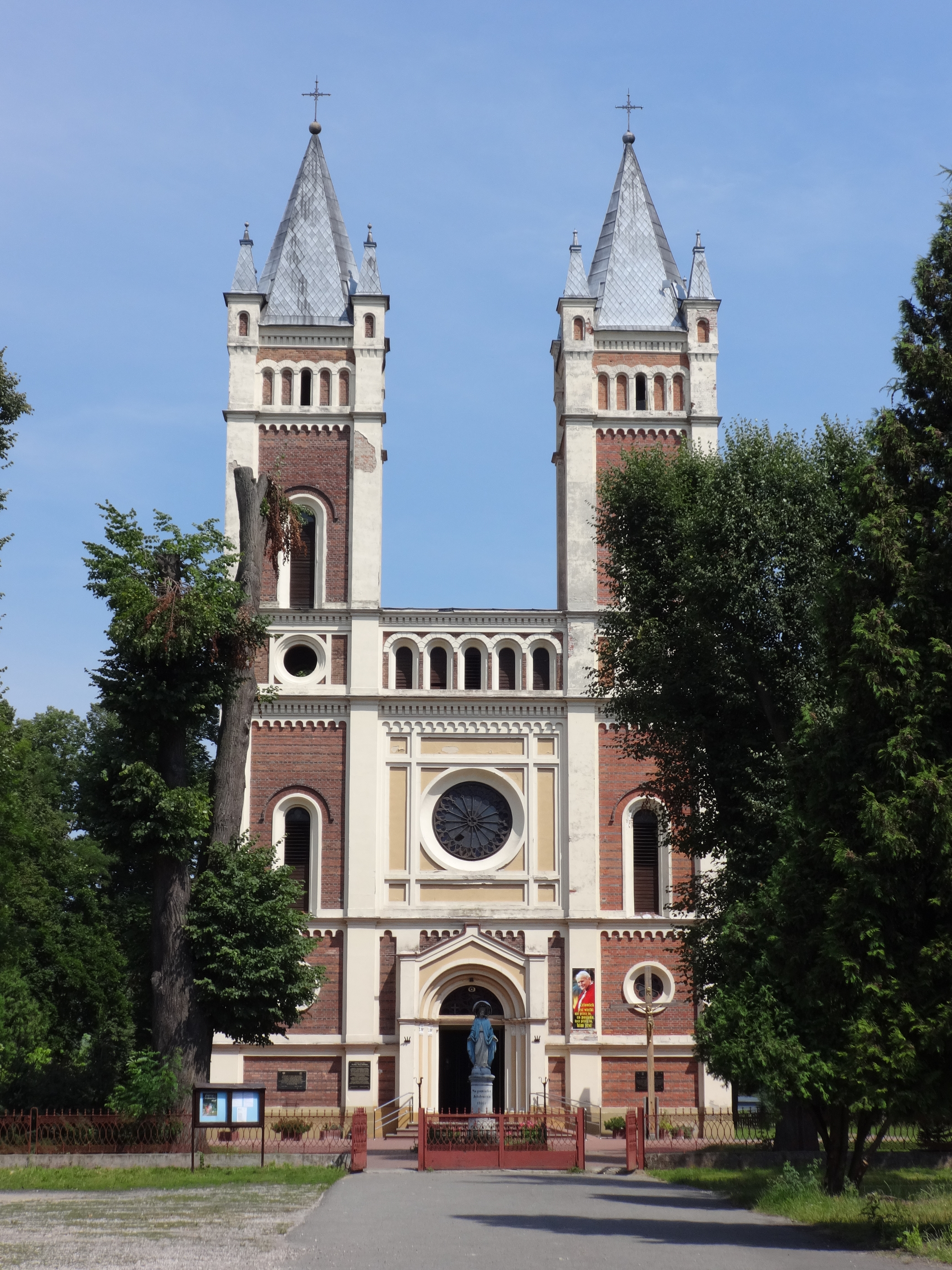
- Church of the Immaculate Conception of the Virgin Mary

- Location within Poland
- Coordinates: 50°56′N 19°38′E
- Country: Poland
- Voivodeship: Łódź
- County: Radomsko
- Gmina: Żytno

Population
  - Total: 710
- Time zone: UTC+1 (CET)
  - Summer (DST): UTC+2 (CEST)
- Vehicle registration: ERA

Żytno [ˈʐɨtnɔ] is a village in Radomsko County, Łódź Voivodeship, in central Poland. It is the seat of the Gmina (administrative district) called Gmina Żytno. It is located in the historic Sieradz Land.

It was a private town, administratively located in the Radomsko County in the Sieradz Voivodeship in the Greater Poland Province of the Kingdom of Poland.
