= Gmina Ładzice =

Gmina Ładzice Ładzice Commune
- Gmina
- Interactive map of Gmina Ładzice
- Coordinates (Ładzice): 51°4′51″N 19°21′4″E
- Country: Poland
- Voivodeship: Łódź
- County: Radomsko
- Seat: Ładzice

Area
  - Total: 82.72 km^{2} (31.94 sq mi)

Population (2006)
  - Total: 4,928
  - Density: 59.57/km^{2} (154.3/sq mi)

Gmina Ładzice is a rural gmina (administrative district) in Radomsko County, Łódź Voivodeship, in central Poland. Its seat is the village of Ładzice, which lies approximately 8 kilometres (5 mi) west of Radomsko and 79 km (49 mi) south of the regional capital Łódź.

The gmina covers an area of 82.72 square kilometres (31.9 sq mi), and as of 2006 its total population is 4,928.

== Villages ==
Gmina Ładzice contains the villages and settlements of Adamów, Borki, Brodowe, Jankowice, Jedlno Drugie, Jedlno Pierwsze, Józefów, Kozia Woda, Ładzice, Radziechowice Drugie, Radziechowice Pierwsze, Stobiecko Szlacheckie, Tomaszów, Wierzbica, Wola Jedlińska and Zakrzówek Szlachecki.

== Neighbouring gminas ==
Gmina Ładzice is bordered by the town of Radomsko and by the gminas of Dobryszyce, Kruszyna, Lgota Wielka, Nowa Brzeźnica, Radomsko and Strzelce Wielkie.
