= Ładzice =

- Village
- Location within Poland
- Coordinates: 51°4′51″N 19°21′4″E
- Country: Poland
- Voivodeship: Łódź
- County: Radomsko
- Gmina: Ładzice
- Population: 470

Ładzice [waˈd͡ʑit͡sɛ] is a village in Radomsko County, Łódź Voivodeship, in central Poland. It is the seat of the gmina (administrative district) called Gmina Ładzice.
