= Symbols of Radomsko County =

Coat of arms of Radomsko County
- Adopted: 2000
- Shield: Blue Iberian style escutcheon
- Compartment: Red wall with two towers, a knight in silver armour and helmet, and a shield divided horizontally onto red and white stripes, with a white (silver) half-lion, and a black half-eagle, and yellow (golden) crown
- Use: Radomsko County

Flag of Radomsko County
- Use: Radomsko County
- Proportion: 5:8
- Adopted: 2000
- Design: Rectangle divided vertically into three stripes: red, white, and red, with the middle stripe three times bigger and the side ones, and with the coat of arms of the county in the middle

The coat of arms and the flag that serve as the symbols of the Radomsko County, Łódź Voivodeship in Poland. They were established in 2000.

== Design ==
The coat of arms is an Iberian style escutcheon with a blue background. In it, is located a red wall with a visible brick pattern, and two towers, between which is a shield partitioned in two, vertically. On the right red field is a silver half-lion, on the left silver field a black half-eagle, both of these share a golden crown. In each tower a rectangular opening is present. In the gate there stands a knight in silver armour, propped on his spear; he wears a silver helmet without any decorations.

The flag is a rectangle with the aspect ratio of height to width ratio of 5:8. It is divided vertically into 3 stripes that are, from left to right, red, white, and red. The middle stripe, is three times bigger that the stripes on the sides. In the middle of the flag is placed the coat of arms of the county.

== History ==
The coat of arms and the flag of Radomsko County were established in 2000. They were established without the approval of the Heraldic Commission of Poland. The county applied the coat of arms for the approval in 2006, however, the design had been rejected by the commission, which stated, that it was not relevant to the history and culture of the area. Despite that, the commission did not have powers to forbid the county from using the design. In 2018, the county council had announced that it had begun the process of replacing the design of its coat of arms and flag.
