= Dobryszyce =

- Village
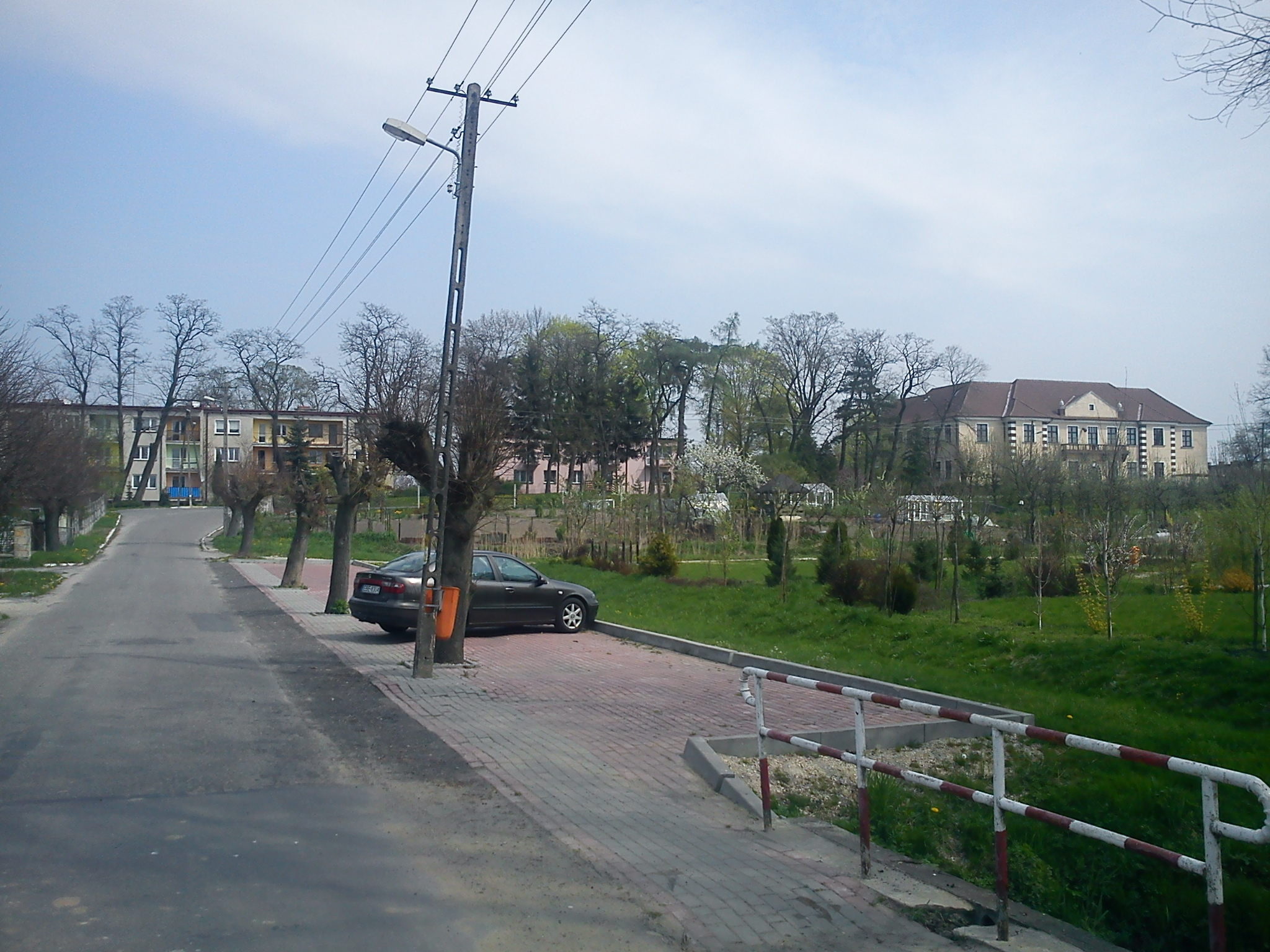

- Location within Poland
- Coordinates: 51°8′43″N 19°24′22″E
- Country: Poland
- Voivodeship: Łódź
- County: Radomsko
- Gmina: Dobryszyce
- Population: 1,020

Dobryszyce [dɔbrɨˈʂɨt͡sɛ] is a village in Radomsko County, Łódź Voivodeship, in central Poland. It is the seat of the gmina (administrative district) called Gmina Dobryszyce.
