= Radomsko County =

Radomsko County Powiat radomszczański
- County
- Flag Coat of arms

- Location within the voivodeship

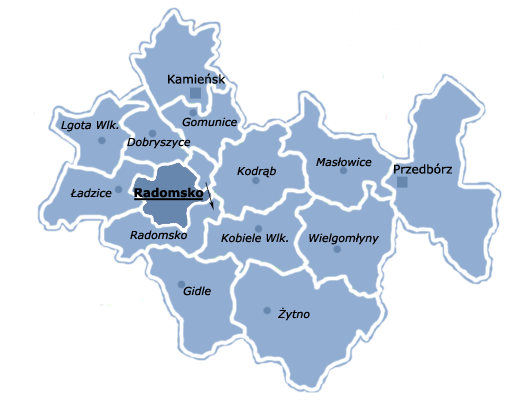
- Division into gminas
- Coordinates (Radomsko): 51°4′N 19°27′E
- Country: Poland
- Voivodeship: Łódź
- Seat: Radomsko
- Gminas: Total 14 (incl. 1 urban): Radomsko; Gmina Dobryszyce; Gmina Gidle; Gmina Gomunice; Gmina Kamieńsk; Gmina Kobiele Wielkie; Gmina Kodrąb; Gmina Ładzice; Gmina Lgota Wielka; Gmina Masłowice; Gmina Przedbórz; Gmina Radomsko; Gmina Wielgomłyny; Gmina Żytno

Area
  - Total: 1,442.78 km^{2} (557.06 sq mi)

Population (2006)
  - Total: 118,856
  - Density: 82.3799/km^{2} (213.363/sq mi)
  - Urban: 55,768
  - Rural: 63,088
- Car plates: ERA
- Website: www.radomszczanski.pl

Radomsko County (Polish: powiat radomszczański) is a unit of territorial administration and local government (powiat) in Łódź Voivodeship, central Poland. It came into being on 1 January 1999 as a result of the Polish local government reforms passed in 1998. Its administrative seat and largest town is Radomsko, which lies 80 kilometres (50 mi) south of the regional capital Łódź. The county also contains the towns of Przedbórz, lying 31 km (19 mi) east of Radomsko, and Kamieńsk, 16 km (10 mi) north of Radomsko.

The county covers an area of 1,442.78 square kilometres (557.1 sq mi). As of 2006, it had a population of 118,856, out of which the population of Radomsko was 49,152, that of Przedbórz was 3,758, that of Kamieńsk was 2,858, and the rural population was 63,088.

== Neighboring counties ==
Radomsko County is bordered by Bełchatów County and Piotrków County to the north, Końskie County and Włoszczowa County to the east, Częstochowa County to the south-west, and Pajęczno County to the west.

== Administrative divisions ==
The county is subdivided into 14 gminas (one urban, two urban-rural and 11 rural). These are listed in the following table, in descending order of population.

| Gmina | Type | Area (km^{2}) | Population (2006) | Seat |
|---|---|---|---|---|
| Radomsko | urban | 62.0 | 49,152 | |
| Gmina Przedbórz | urban-rural | 189.9 | 7,595 | Przedbórz |
| Gmina Gidle | rural | 116.3 | 6,610 | Gidle |
| Gmina Kamieńsk | urban-rural | 95.8 | 6,094 | Kamieńsk |
| Gmina Gomunice | rural | 62.6 | 5,966 | Gomunice |
| Gmina Żytno | rural | 197.5 | 5,716 | Żytno |
| Gmina Radomsko | rural | 85.3 | 5,653 | Radomsko * |
| Gmina Wielgomłyny | rural | 123.1 | 4,951 | Wielgomłyny |
| Gmina Ładzice | rural | 82.7 | 4,928 | Ładzice |
| Gmina Kodrąb | rural | 105.8 | 4,732 | Kodrąb |
| Gmina Lgota Wielka | rural | 63.1 | 4,472 | Lgota Wielka |
| Gmina Kobiele Wielkie | rural | 101.9 | 4,434 | Kobiele Wielkie |
| Gmina Masłowice | rural | 116.2 | 4,369 | Masłowice |
| Gmina Dobryszyce | rural | 51.1 | 4,184 | Dobryszyce |
* seat not part of the gmina
