= Henryk Siemiradzki =

Polish painter (1843–1902)

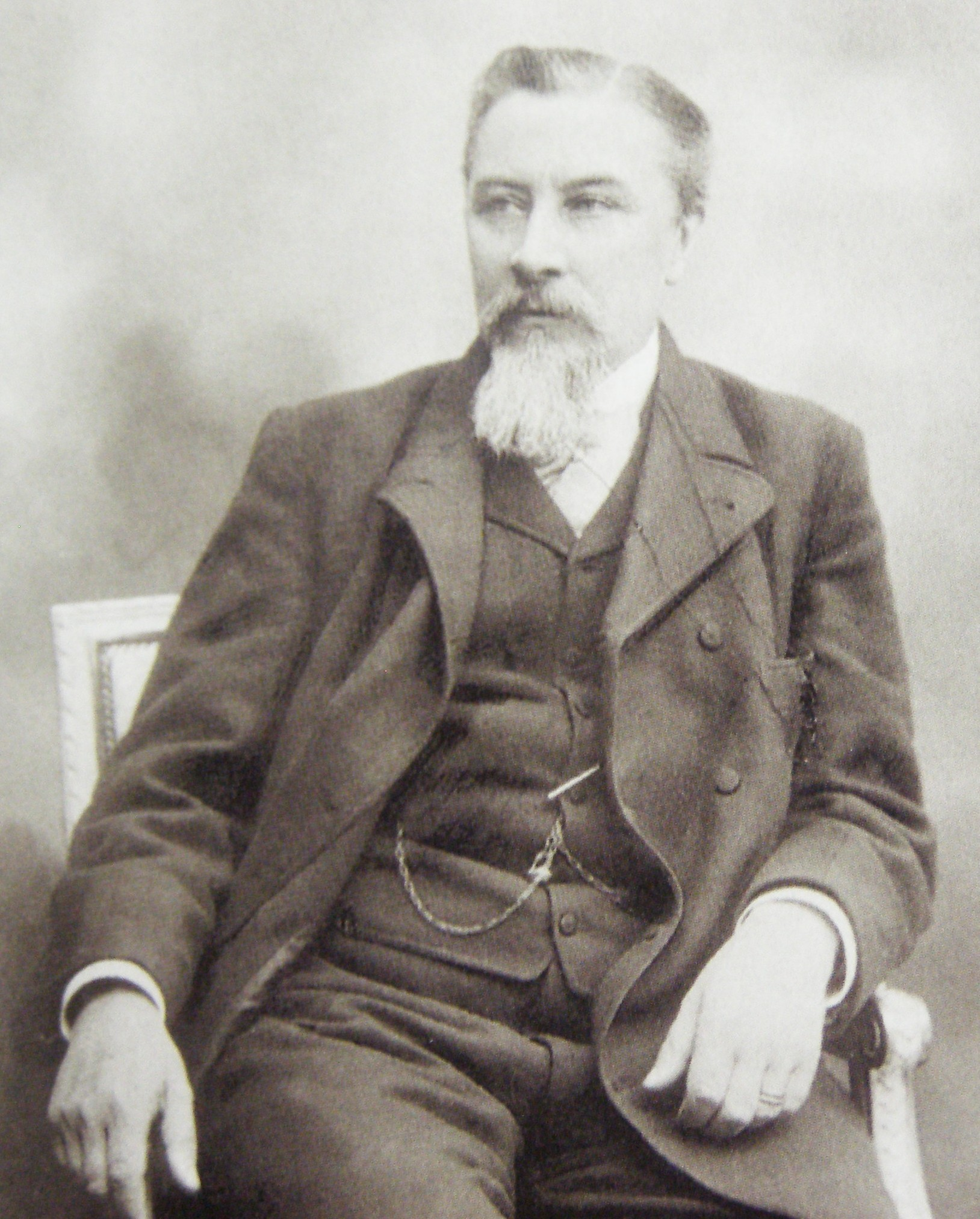
- Henryk Siemiradzki in later life
- Born: Henryk Siemiradzki; 24 October 1843; Novo-Belgorod, Kharkov Governorate, Russian Empire
- Died: 23 August 1902 (aged 58); Strzałków, Congress Poland
- Resting place: Skałka, Kraków
- Education: Member Academy of Arts (1873); Professor by rank (1877)
- Alma mater: V. N. Karazin Kharkiv National University, Imperial Academy of Arts (1871)
- Known for: Painting
- Notable work: Nero's Torches, curtain for the Juliusz Słowacki Theatre in Kraków, curtain for the Lwów Theatre
- Movement: Academism
- Awards: Big Gold Medal of the Imperial Academy of Arts (1870)

Henryk Hektor Siemiradzki (24 October 1843 – 23 August 1902) was a Polish painter. He spent most of his active creative life in Rome. Best remembered for his large history paintings in the academic style, he is particularly known for his depictions of scenes from the ancient Greco-Roman world and the New Testament, owned by many national galleries of Europe.

== Early life and education ==
Siemiradzki was born to Hipolit Siemiradzki, a Polish noble and an officer of the Imperial Russian Army (made general in 1871) and Michalina (née Prószyńska) in Novo-Belgorod (now Pechenihy, Chuhuiv Raion, Kharkiv oblast, Ukraine), near the city of Kharkiv, where his father's regiment was stationed. The family had origins in Radom land and derived its name from the village of Siemiradz. One of the branches settled near Navahrudak (Nowogródek) in the late 17th century.

Henryk's grandfather held the post of podkomorzy in Nowogródek powiat. His parents were close friends with Adam Mickiewicz's family. He studied at Kharkiv Gymnasium where he first learned painting under the local schoolteacher, Dmytro Bezperchy, a former student of Karl Briullov. He entered the physics-mathematics school of Kharkiv University and studied natural sciences there. He continued to paint.

== Adult Life ==
(Note: The source for this section is from the Polish Wikipedia entry: https://pl.wikipedia.org/wiki/Henryk_Siemiradzki)

In 1873 he married his 18-year-old cousin, Maria Pruszyńska, who was from the village of Koroleszczewicze, now Koraliszczewicze, by the Svislach river, in modern day Belarus. They had four children. In 1876, the Siemiradzki family moved into their own villa. In 1884 he bought a manor house in village of Strzałków situated in the Radomsko district, where he and his family spent summer holidays for many years.

In 1901, he fell ill and lost his speech. In that autumn he met with Henryk Sienkiewicz in Łódź. Shortly before his death, with the consent of his doctors, he traveled back to his manor house in Strzałkowo where he died in 1902. He was initially buried in the Powązki Cemetery (plot 67-6-1/2), Warsaw. His remains were moved in 1903 to the national Pantheon on Skałka in Kraków.

== Artistic career ==
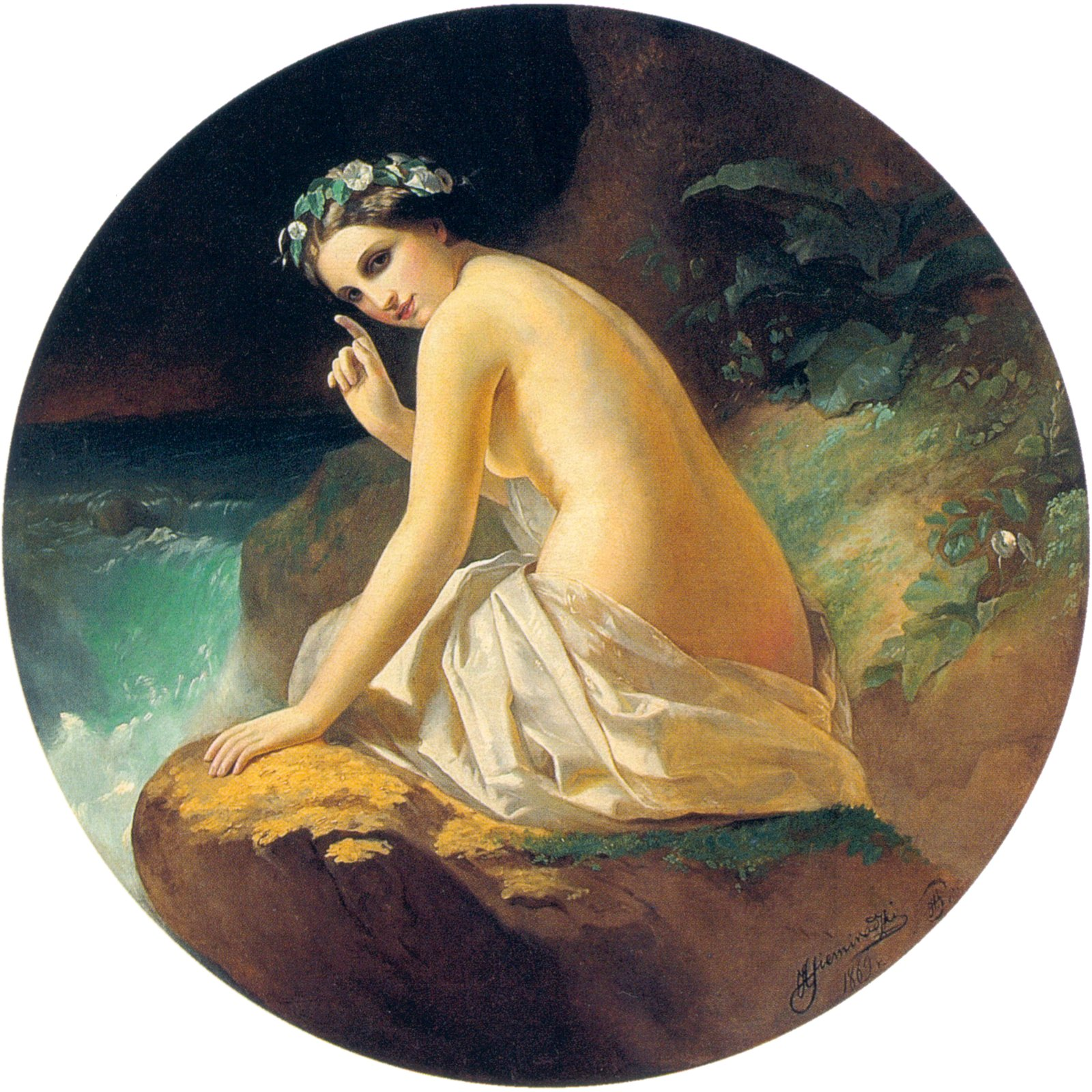
Nymph, 1869 (Lviv Art Gallery)

After graduating from university with a Kandidat degree he abandoned his scientific career and moved to Saint Petersburg to study painting at the Imperial Academy of Arts from 1864 to 1870. Upon his graduation he was awarded a gold medal. In 1870–1871 he studied under Karl von Piloty in Munich on a grant from the Academy. In 1872 he moved to Rome and later built a studio there on Via Gaeta, while spending summers at his estate in Strzałków near Częstochowa.

In 1873 he received the title of Academician of the Imperial Academy of Arts for his painting Christ and a Sinner, based on a verse Sinner written by Aleksey Tolstoy. In 1878 he received the French National Order of the Legion of Honour and a gold medal at the Paris World's Fair for the painting Flower Vase. In 1876–1879 Siemiradzki worked on frescoes for the Cathedral of Christ the Saviour (Moscow) among his other large-scale projects.

In 1879, he offered one of his best-known works, the enormous Pochodnie Nerona (Nero's torches), painted around 1876, to the newly formed Polish National Museum. The artwork is on display at the Siemiradzki Room of the Sukiennice Museum in the Kraków Old Town, the most popular branch of the museum. Around 1893 Siemiradzki worked on two large paintings for the State Historical Museum (Moscow). In 1894, he produced his monumental curtain for the Juliusz Słowacki Theatre in Kraków.

== Commemoration ==
The modern arts gallery at National University in Kharkiv where he studied, is named after Siemiradzki. In January 2025, on the occasion of the 220th anniversary of the V. N. Karazin Kharkiv National University, a monument to Henryk Siemiradsky was unveiled at the entrance to the gallery in the northern building of the university. The monument was created back in 2021, but its installation and opening were postponed due to quarantine restrictions and a Russian invasion of Ukraine.

in 1910, a street in Lviv connecting the modern streets of Gipsova and Konovalets was named after Henryk Siemiradsky.

== Monumental paintings ==
Siemiradzki's large-scale canvasses, including The Sword Dance influenced by the French Académie des Beaux-Arts, are on display at the national museums of Poland, Russia, and Ukraine; notably, at the Sukiennice Museum, the National Museum, Poznań, Lviv National Art Gallery, Tretyakov Gallery, and others.

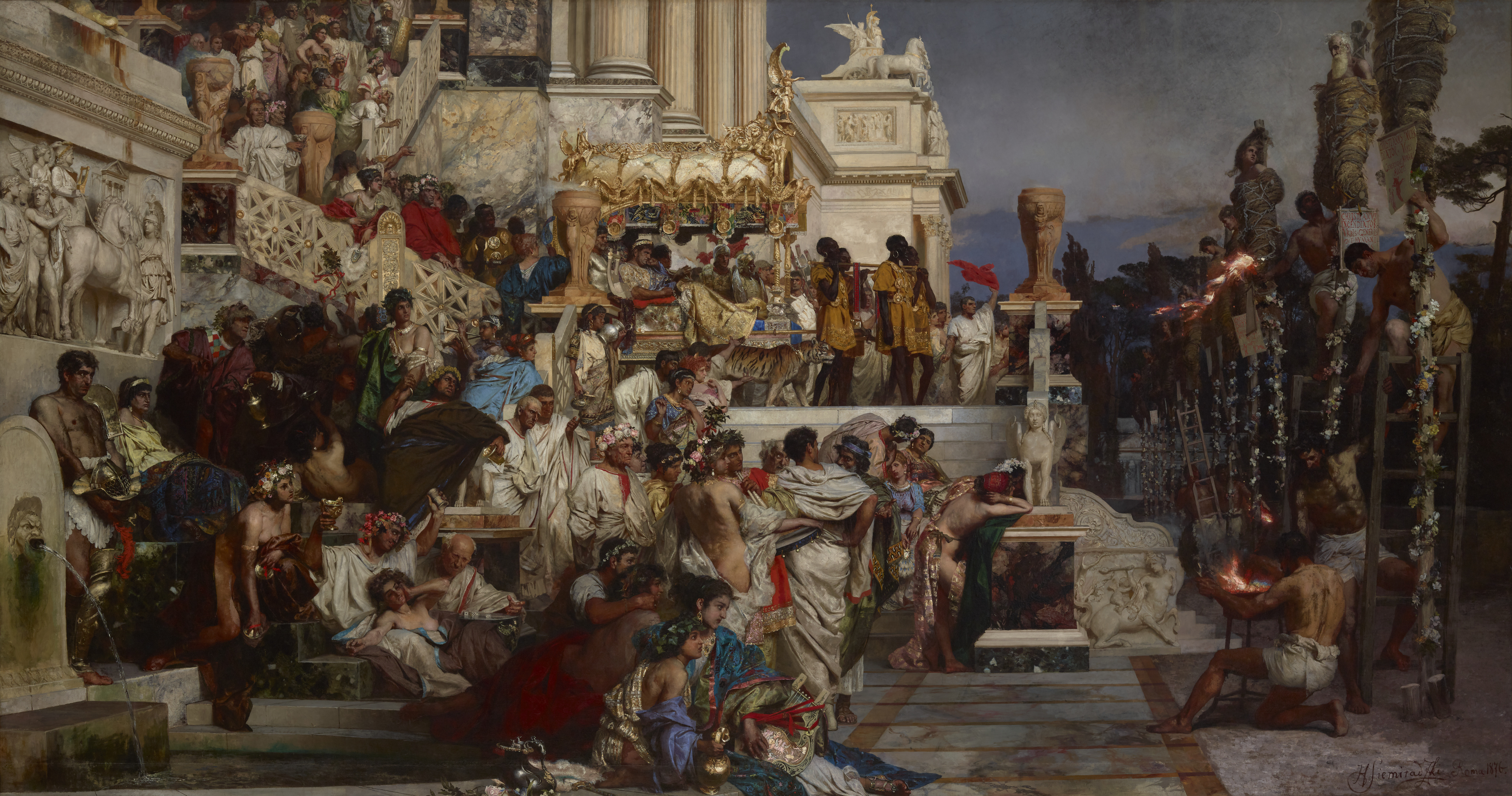
Nero's Torches, 1876, National Museum, Kraków

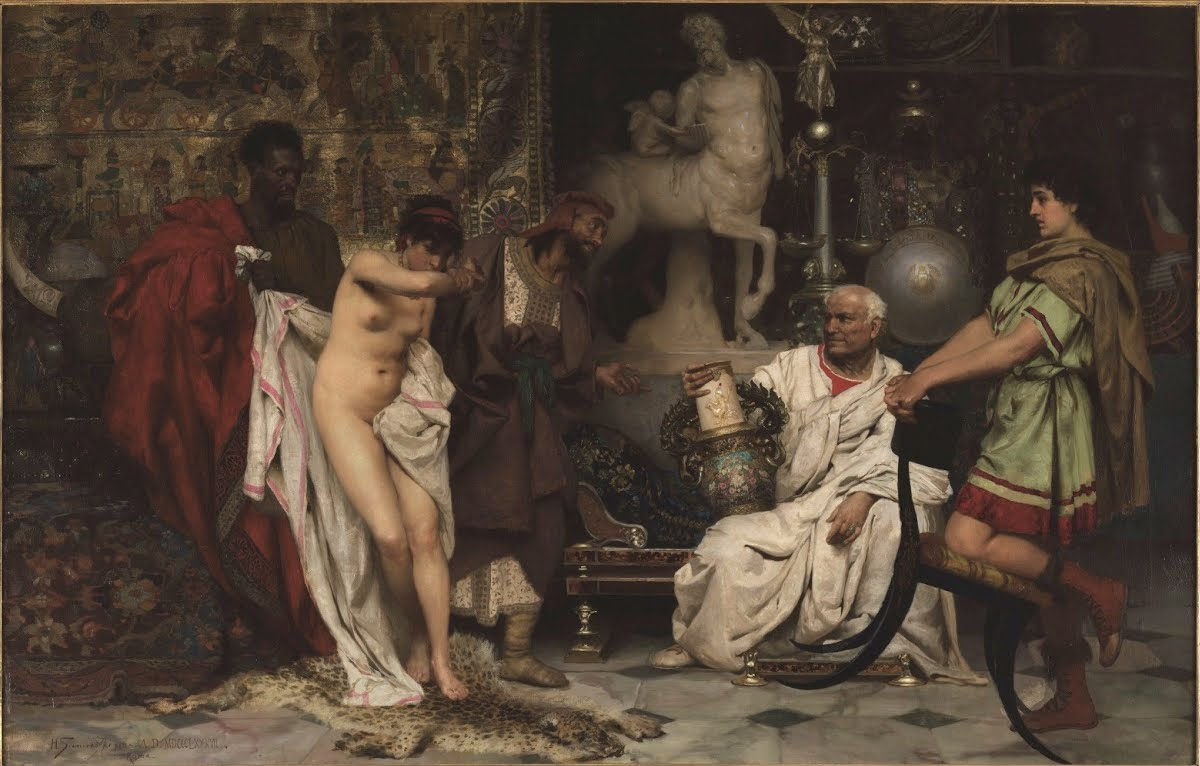
The Girl or the Vase, 1878 Private collection

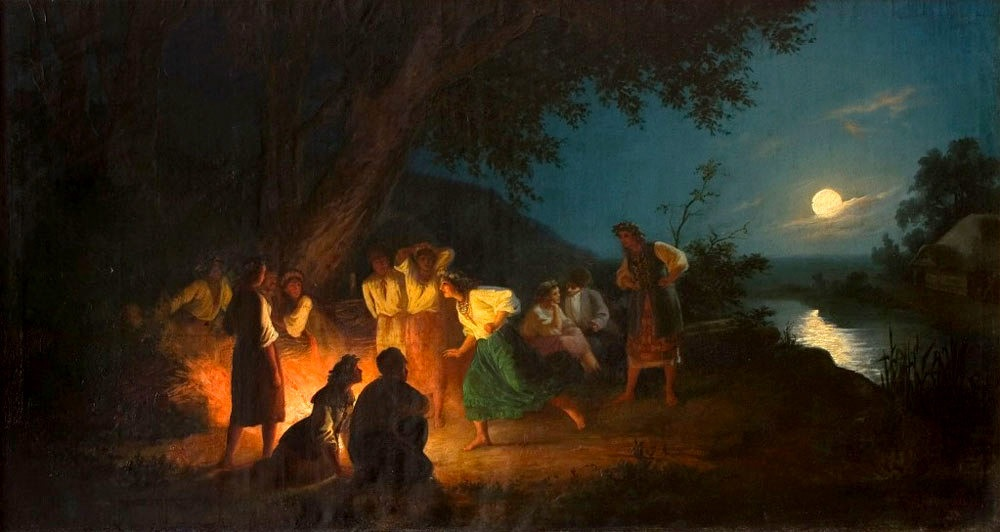
Night on the eve of Ivan Kupala, 1880s, Lviv National Art Gallery

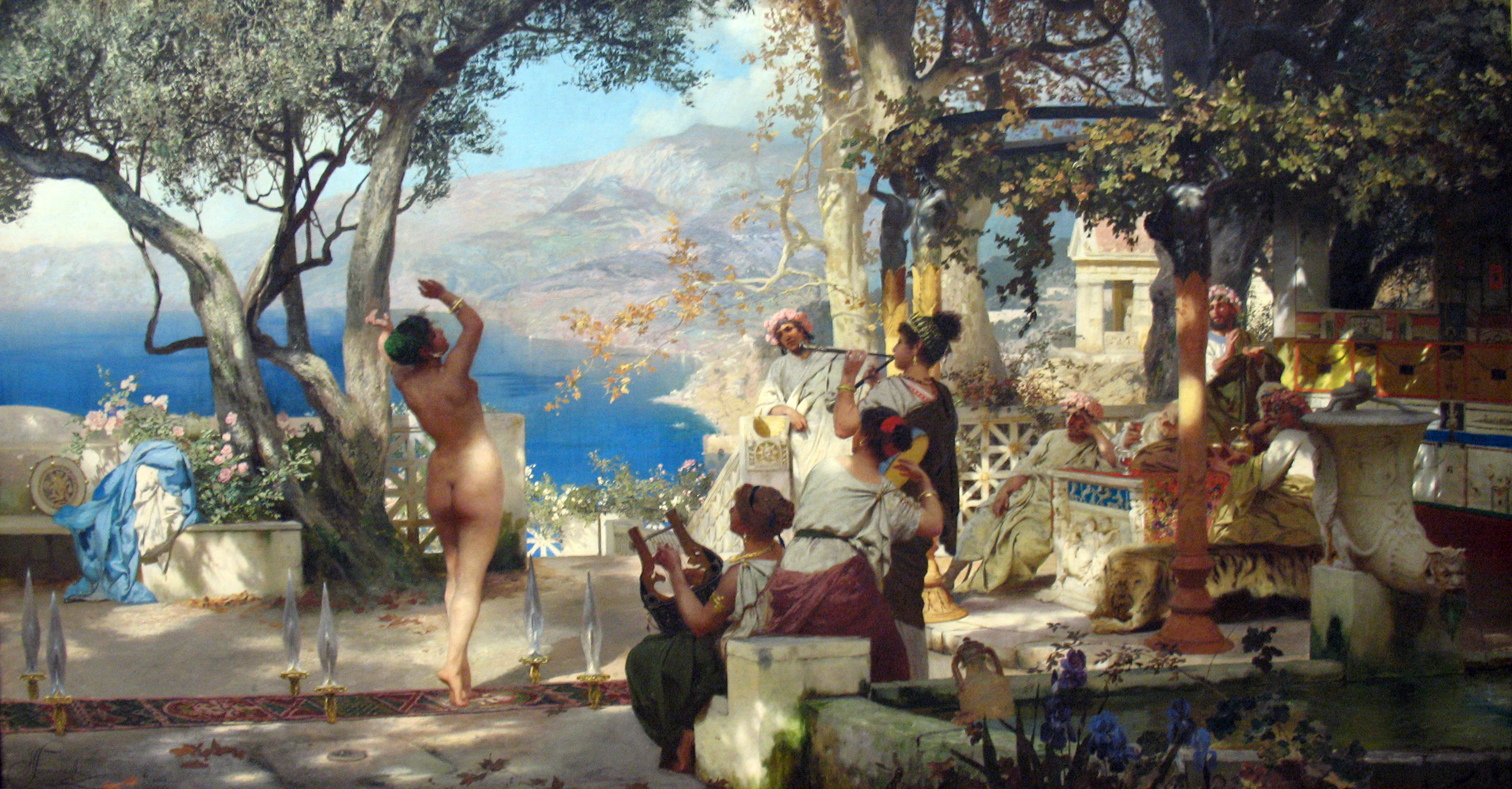
The Sword Dance, 1881, Tretyakov Gallery

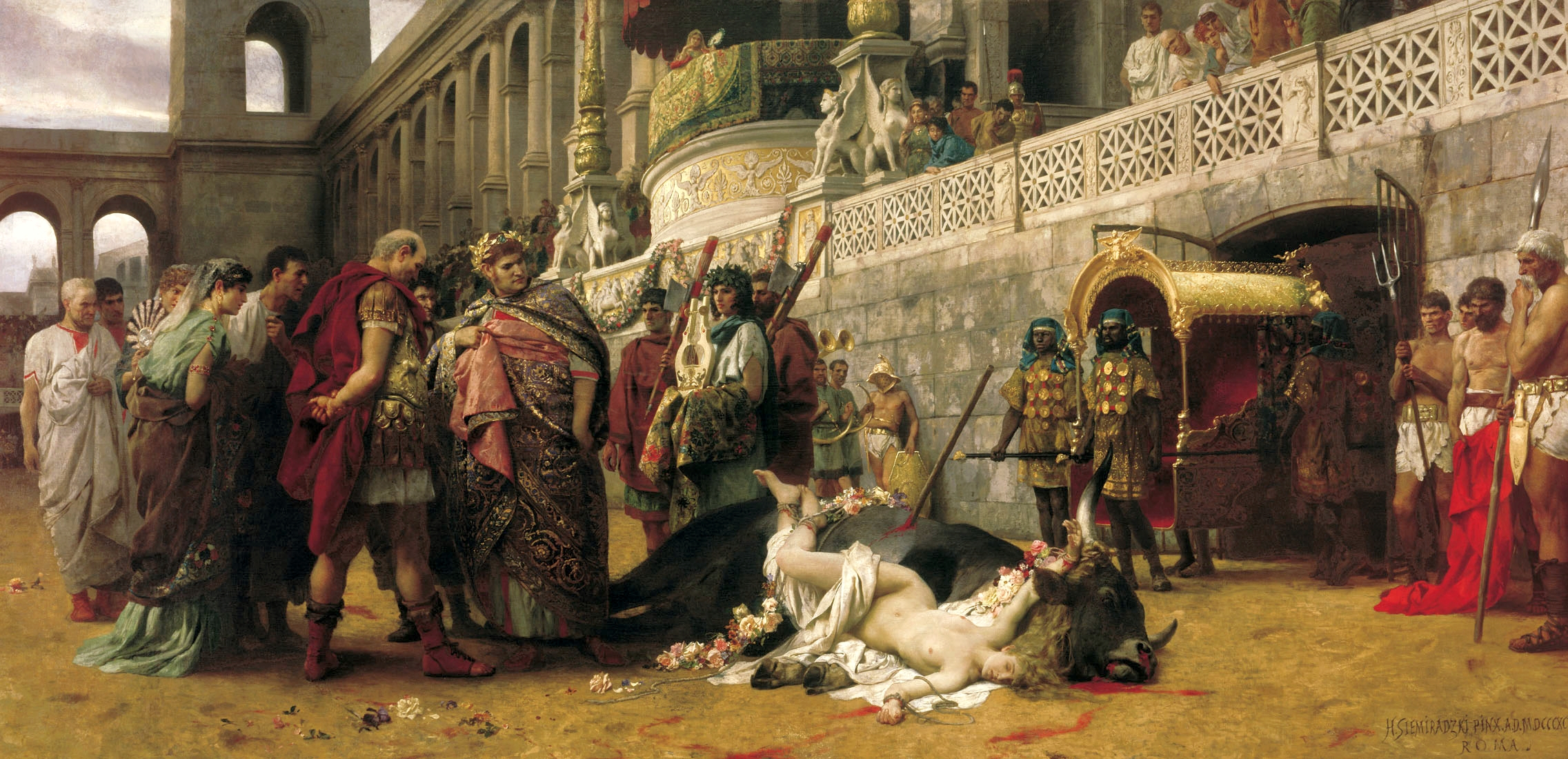
Christian Dirce, 1897, National Museum, Warsaw

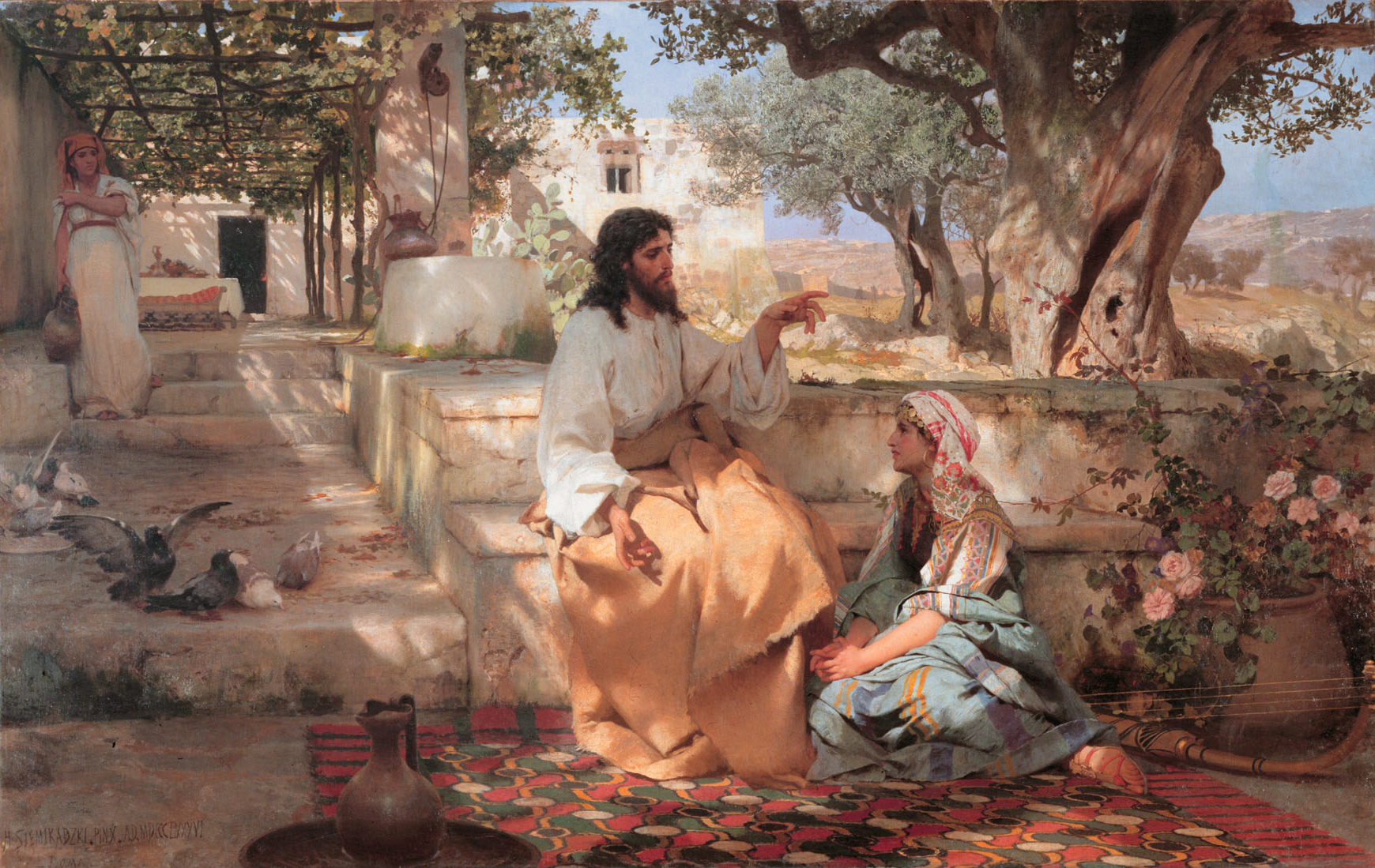
Christ with Martha and Maria, 1886, Russian Museum

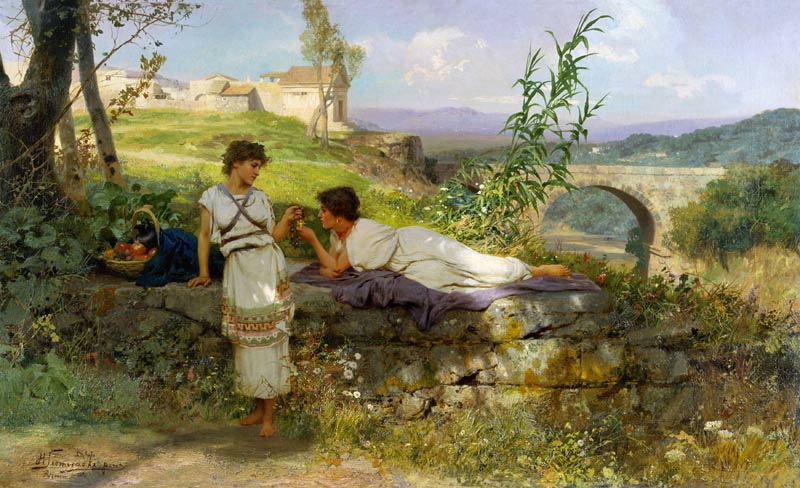
The Talisman, 1880s, Art Museum of Nizhny Novgorod

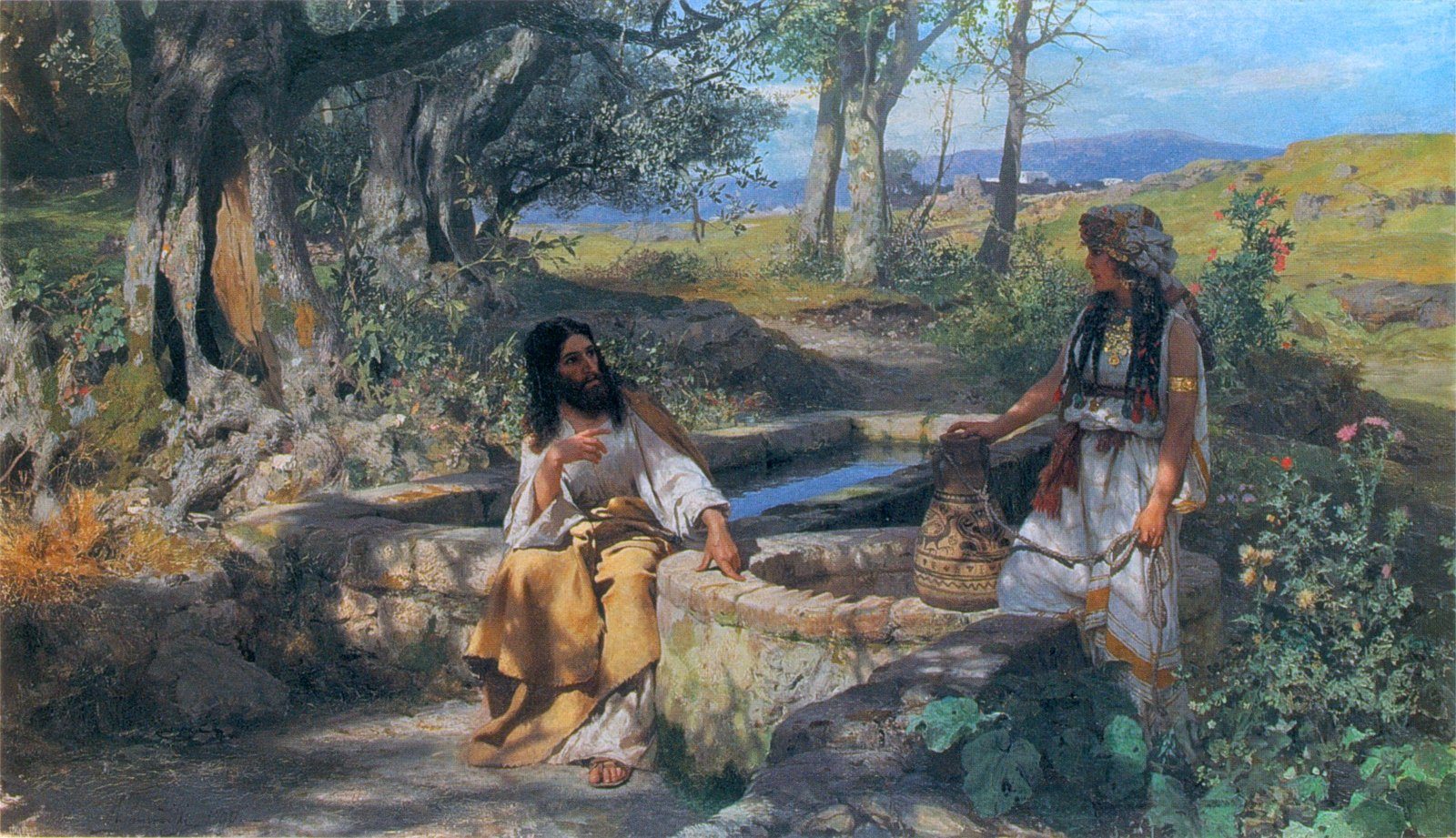
Christ and Samaritan, 1890, Lviv National Art Gallery

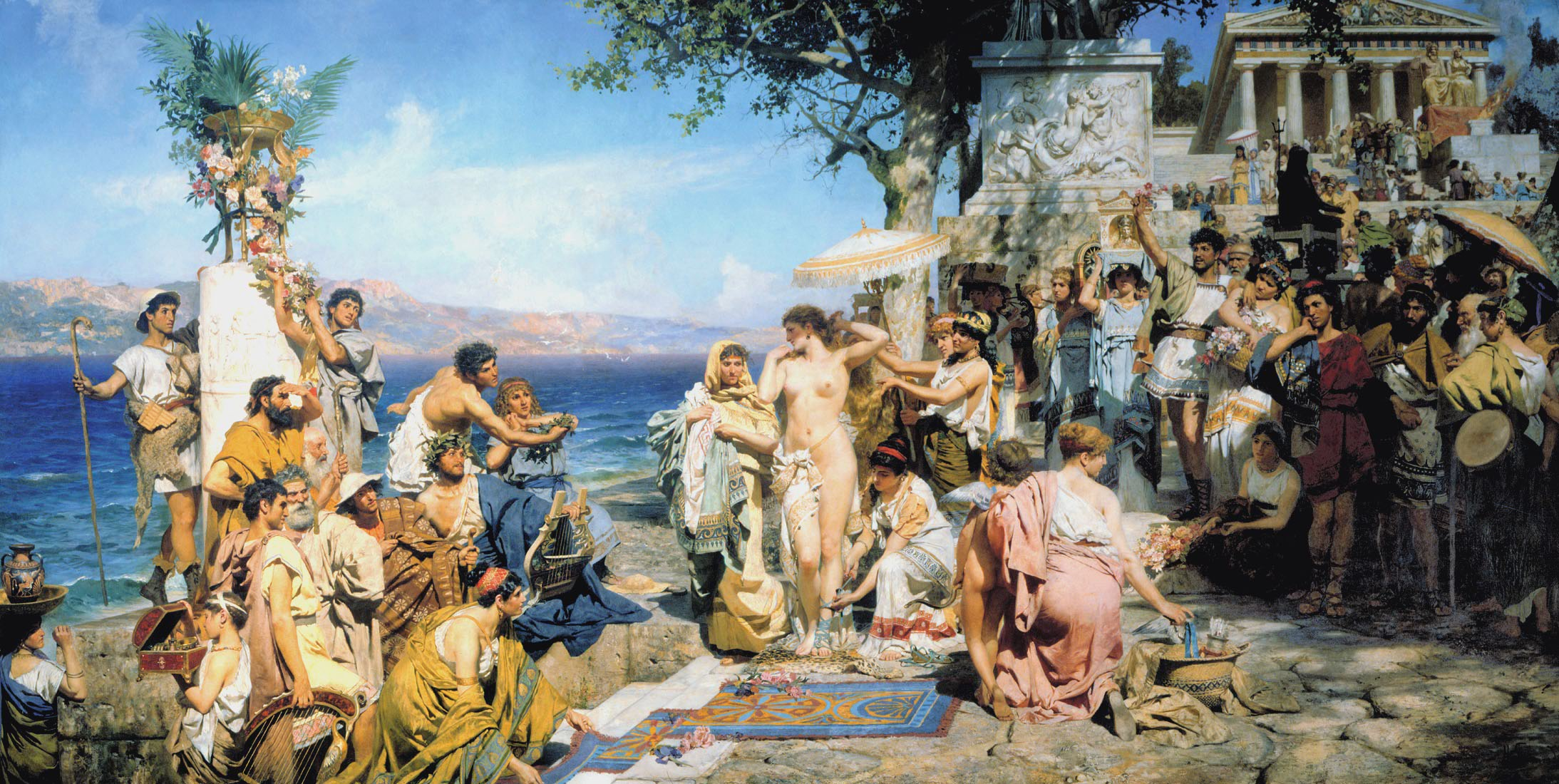
Phryne at the Poseidonia in Eleusis, 1889, Russian Museum
National theatres

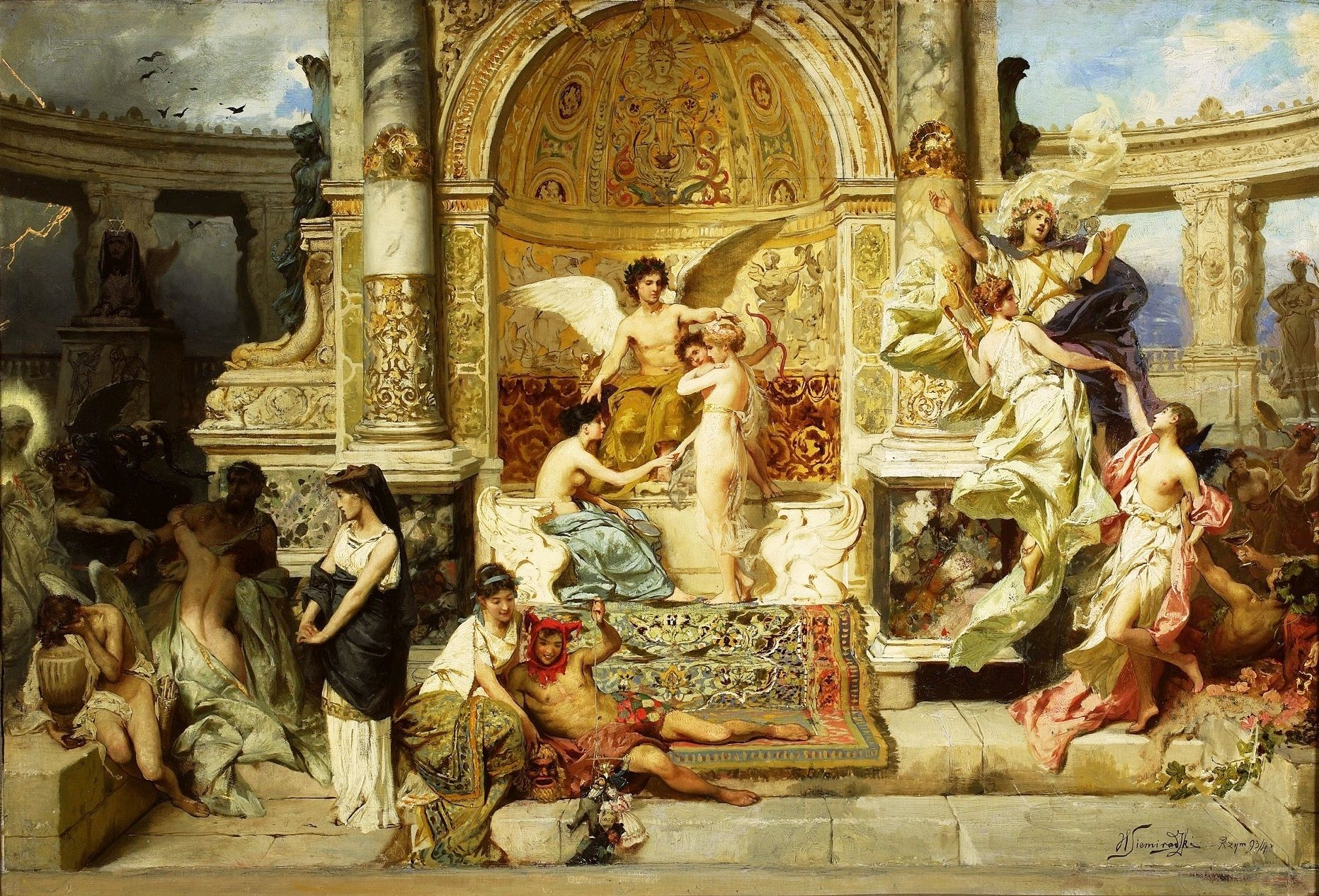
Curtain for the Juliusz Słowacki Theatre in Kraków

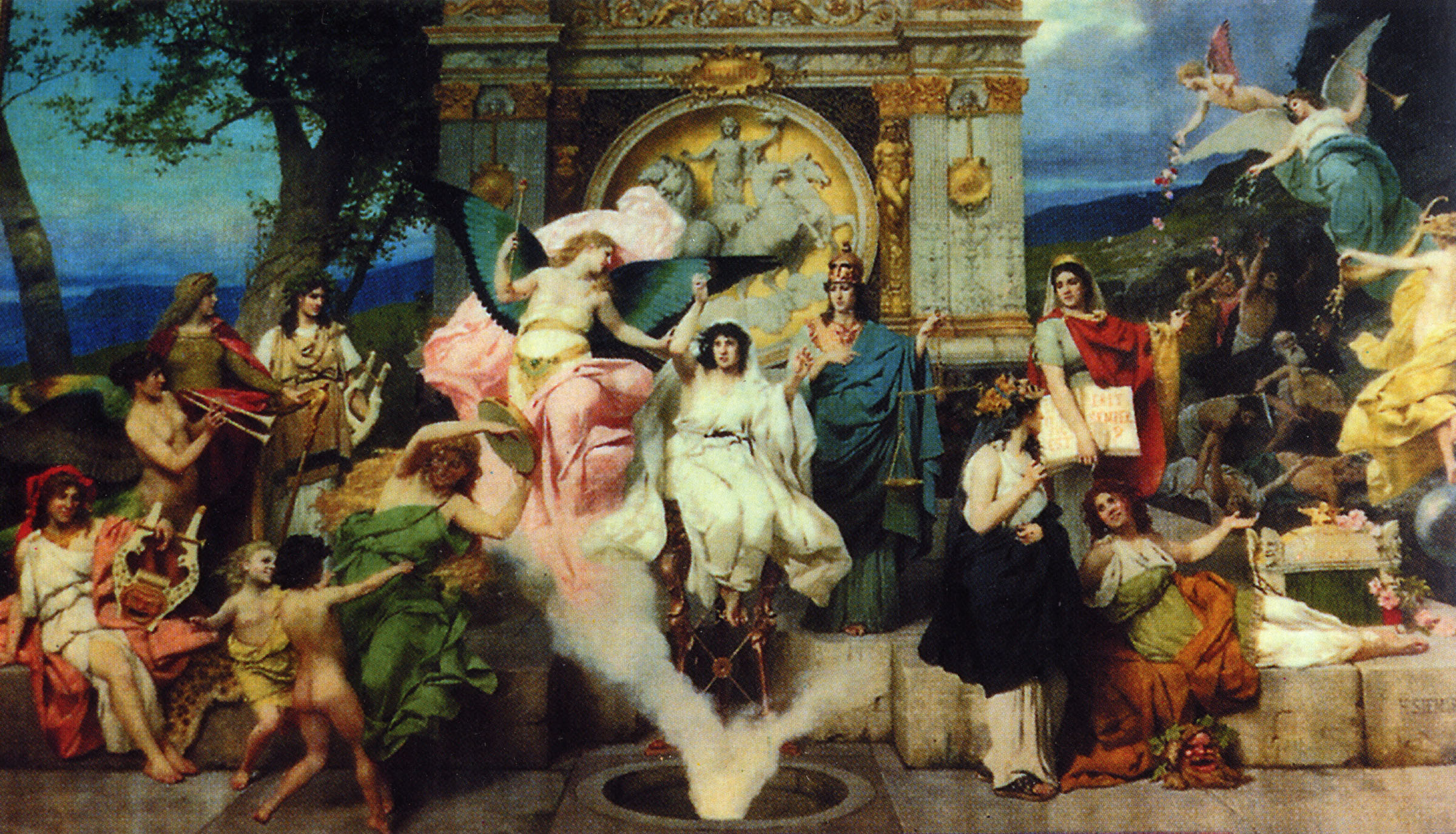
Curtain for the Lviv Theatre of Opera and Ballet

== Other paintings ==
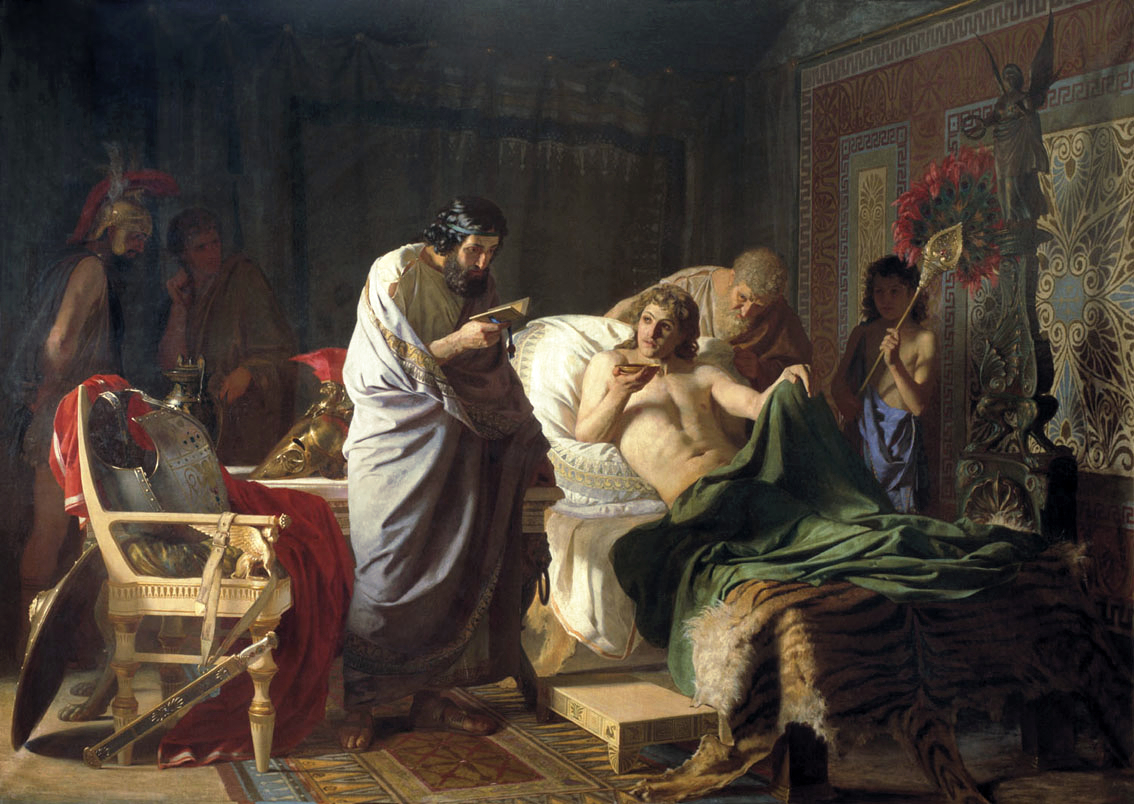
Alexander the Great's trust in Doctor Philip, 1870

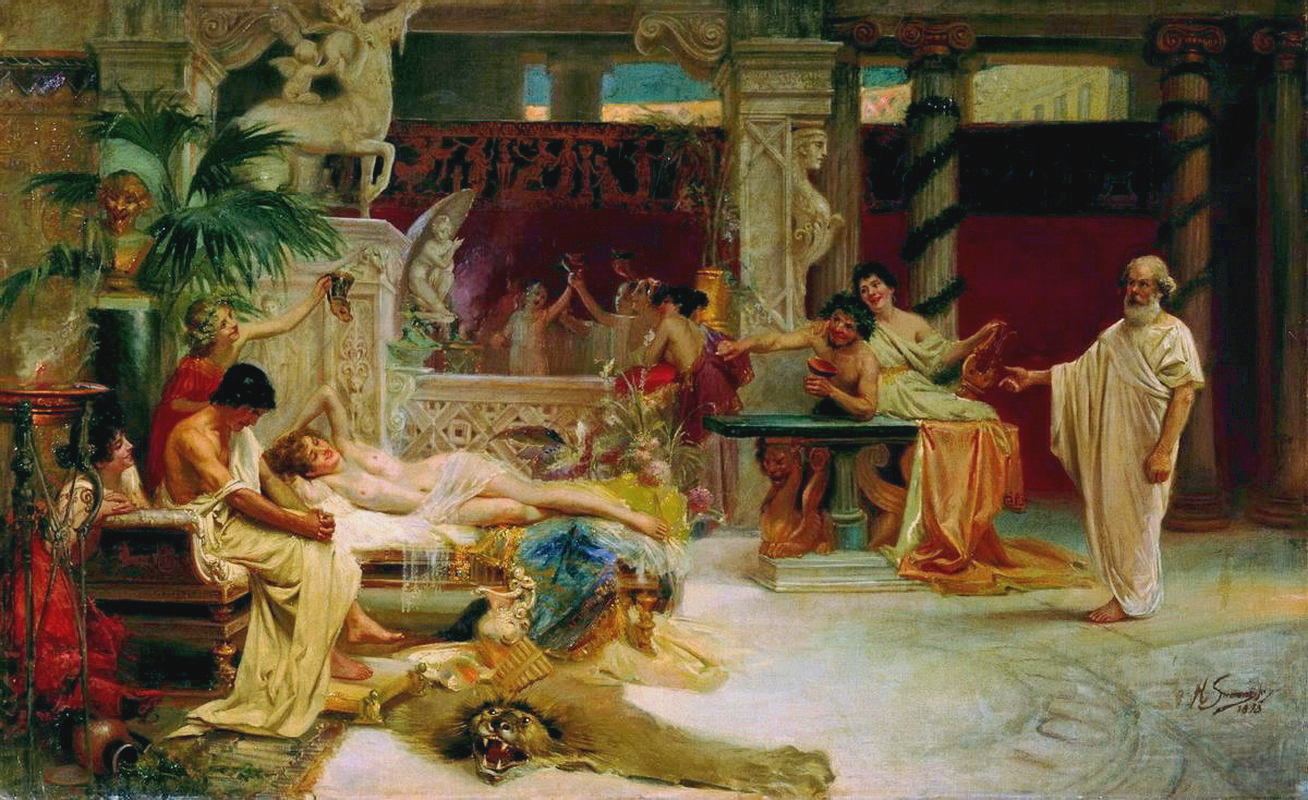
Socrates Finds his Student Alcibiades at Heterai, 1873

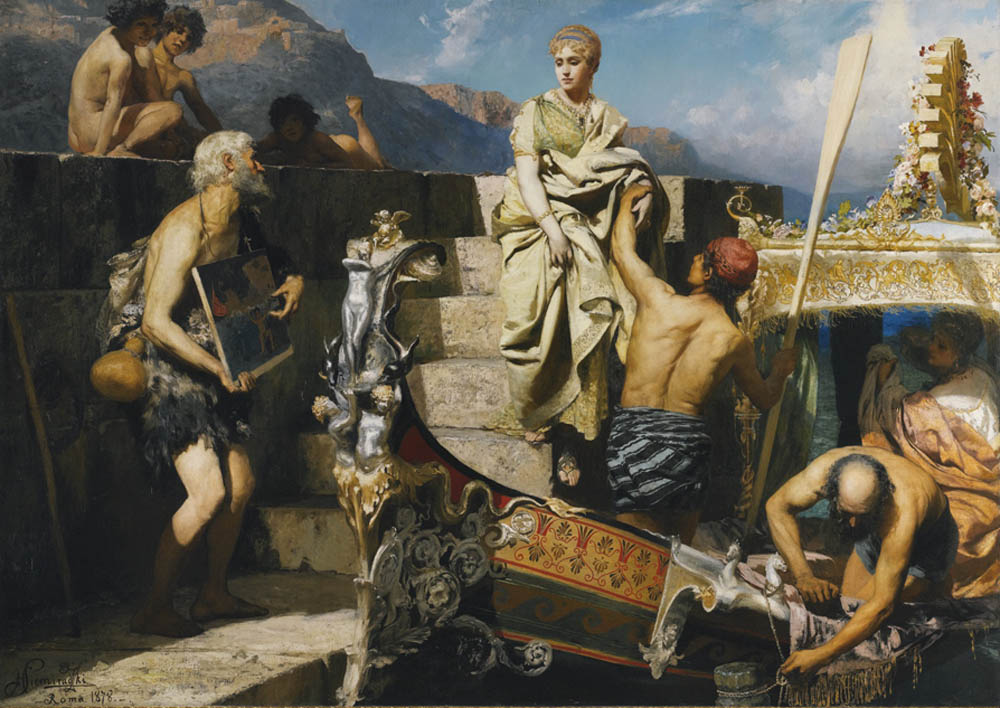
Begging Castaway, 1878

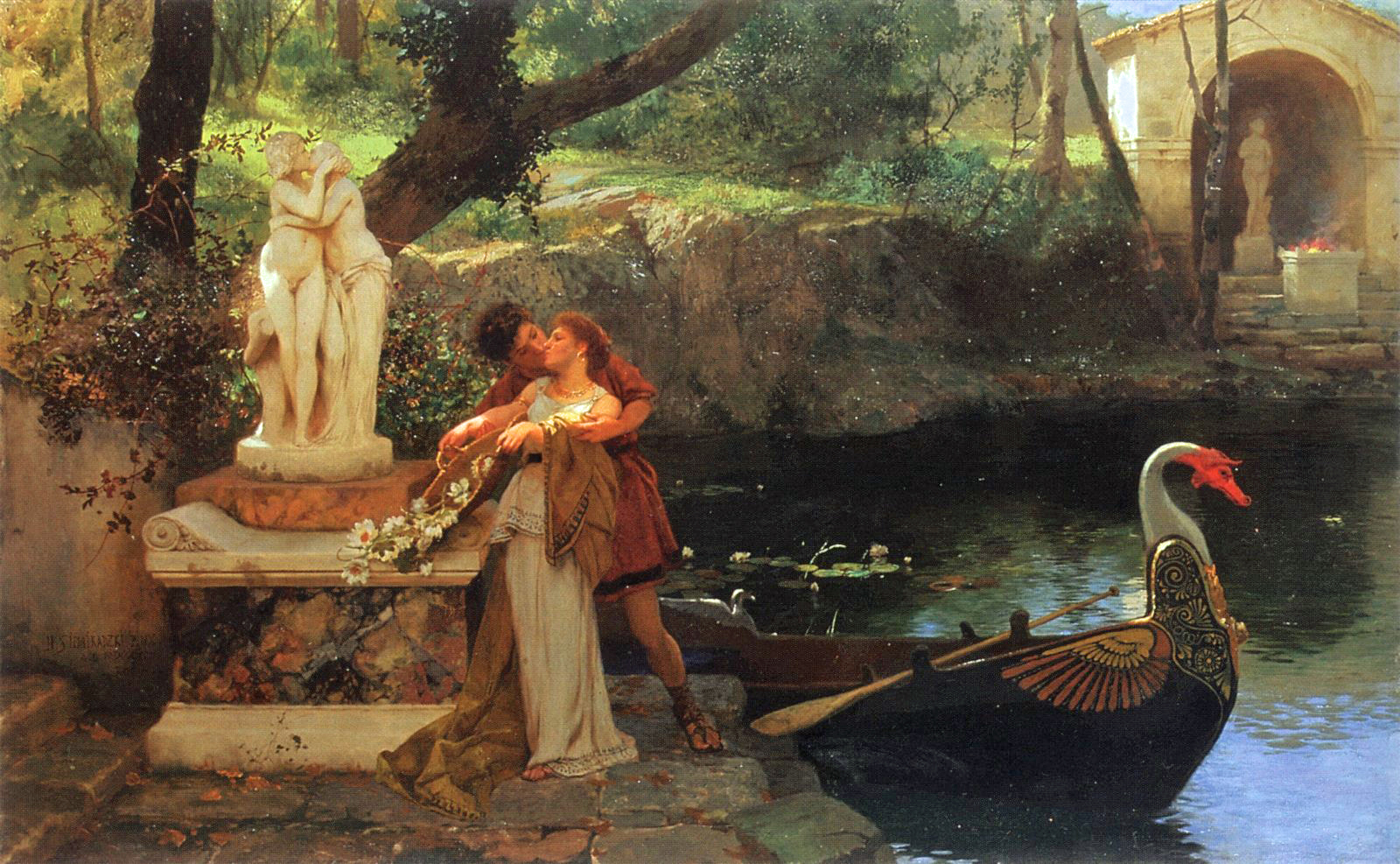
Following the Gods, 1899

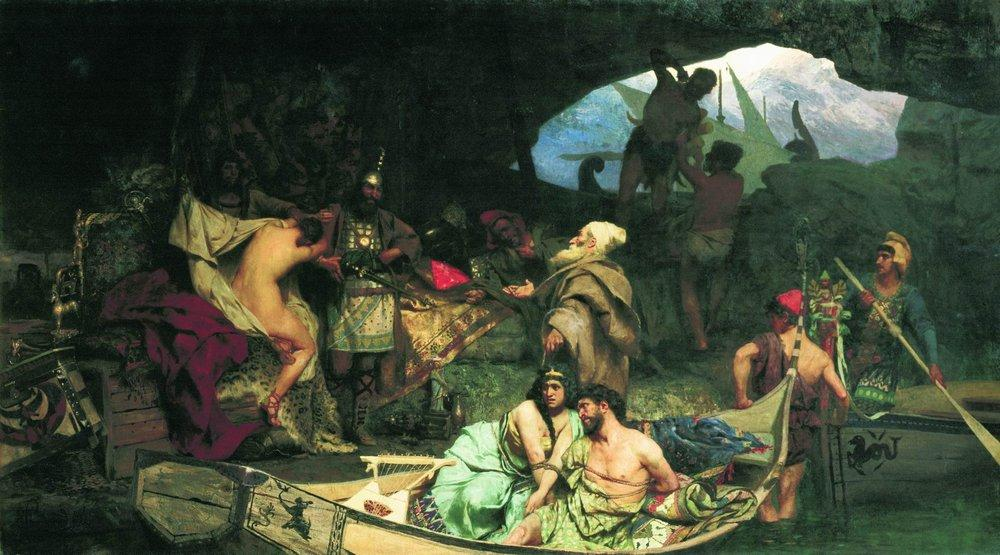
Corsars, 1880

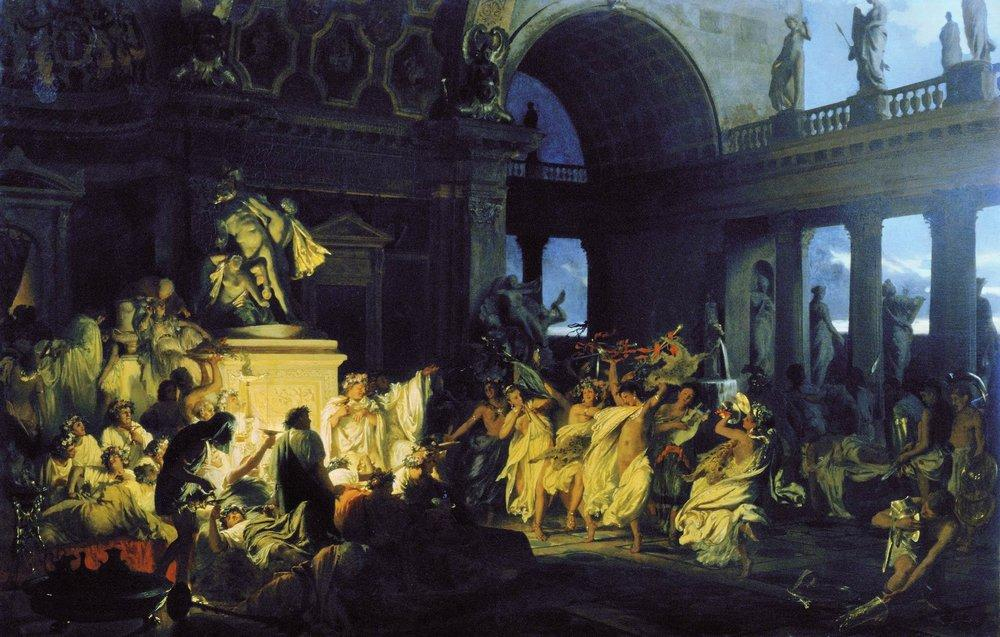
Roman Orgy at Caesar's Time, 1872

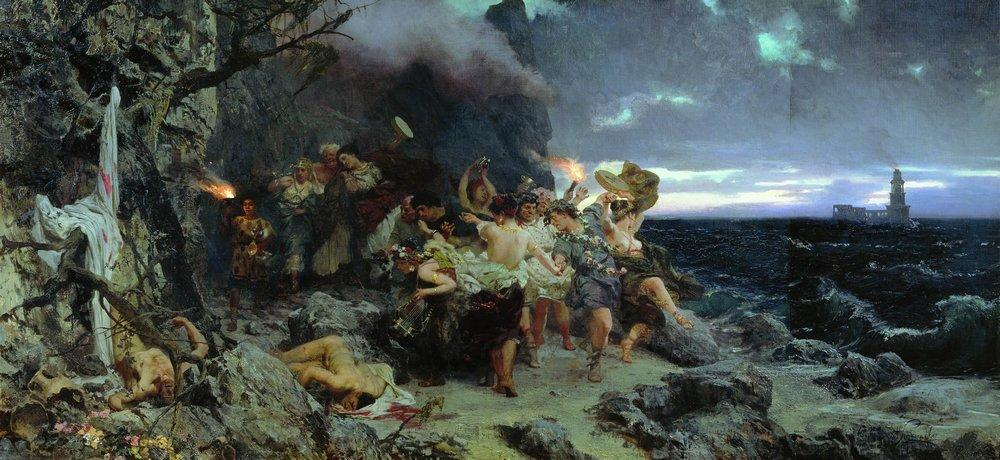
Roman Orgy at Tiberius' Time, 1881

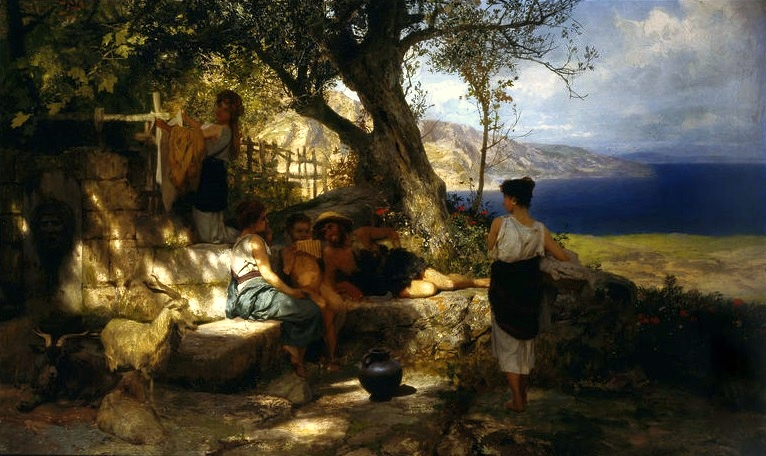
Merry Company by the Spring, 1885

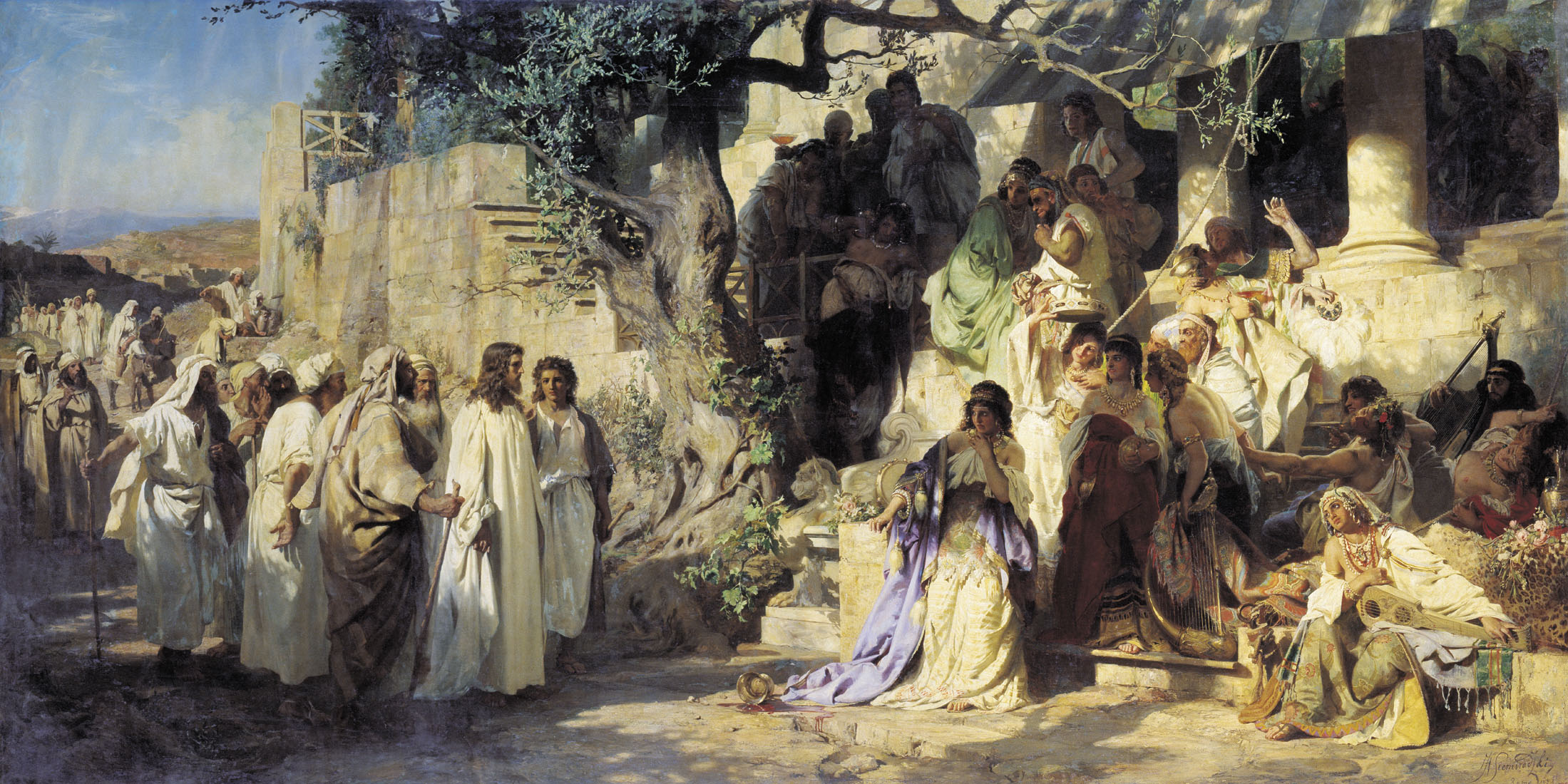
Christ and Sinner, 1873

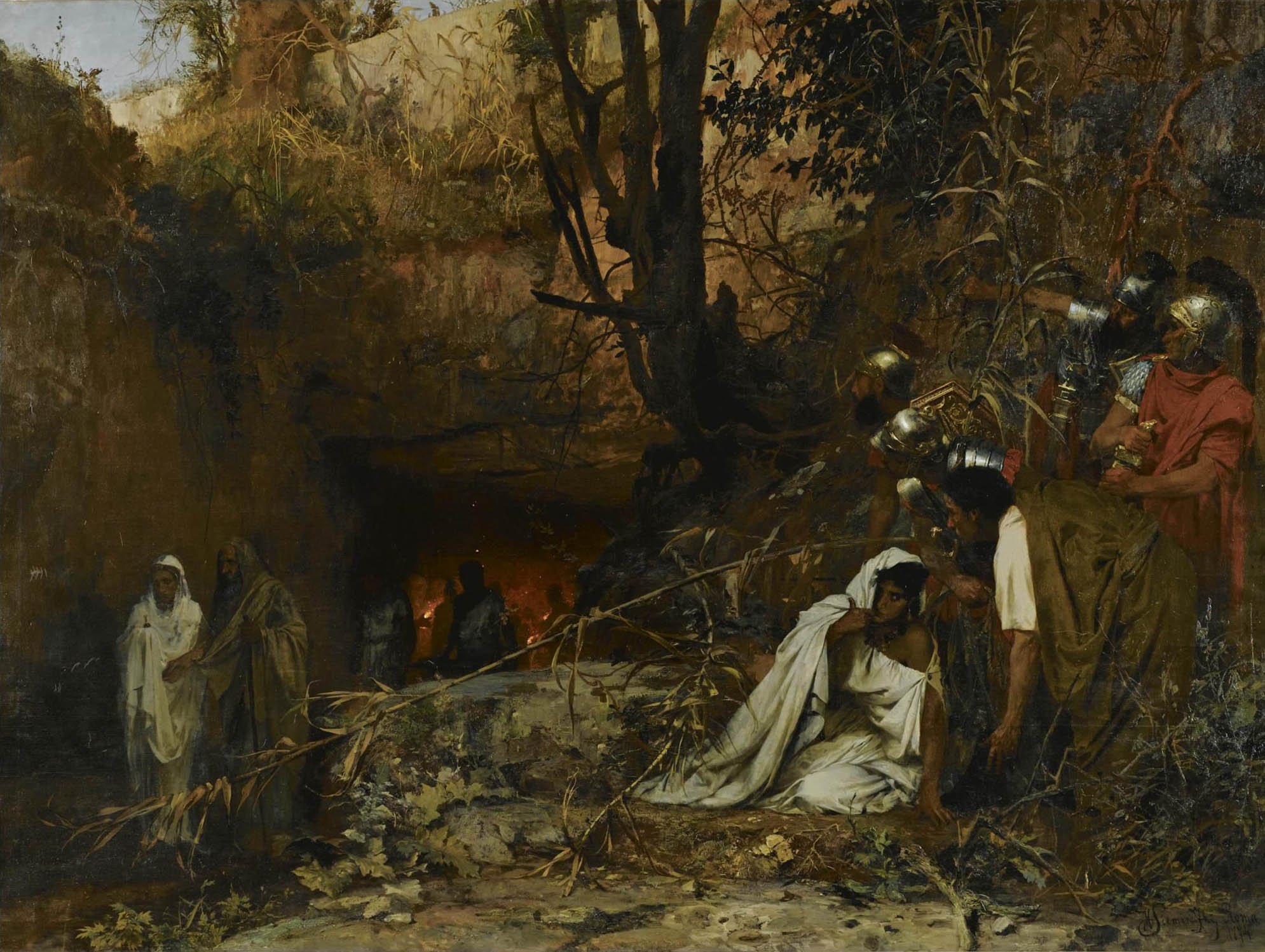
Persecutors of Christians at the Entrance to the Catacombs, 1874
