= Bobry, Łódź Voivodeship =

Bobry
- Village
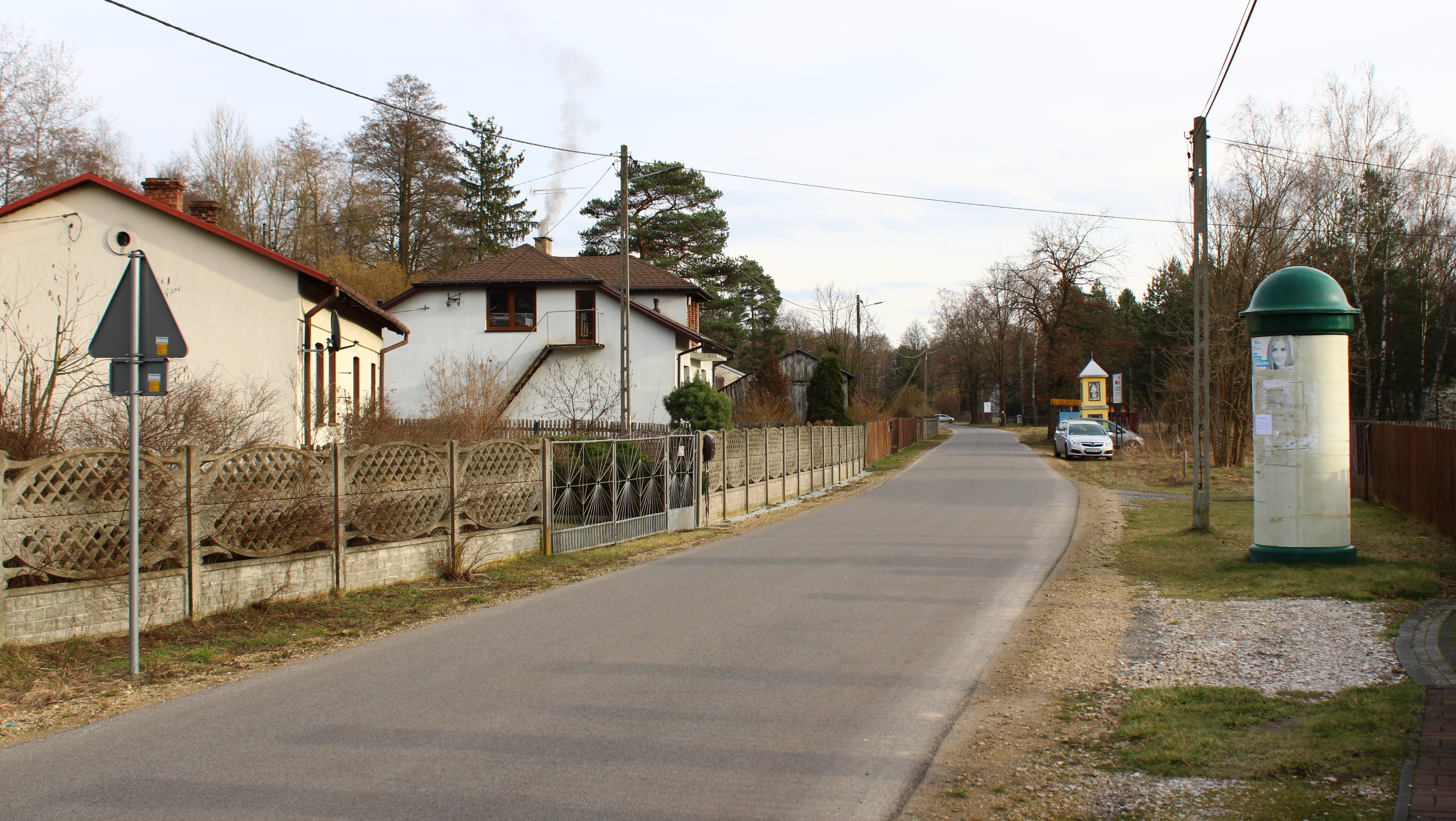

- Location within Poland
- Coordinates: 51°1′21″N 19°24′22″E
- Country: Poland
- Voivodeship: Łódź
- County: Radomsko
- Gmina: Radomsko

Bobry [ˈbɔbrɨ] is a village in the administrative district of Gmina Radomsko, within Radomsko County, Łódź Voivodeship, in central Poland.
