= Dąbrówka, Radomsko County =

Dąbrówka
- Village
- Location within Poland
- Coordinates: 51°2′N 19°23′E
- Country: Poland
- Voivodeship: Łódź
- County: Radomsko
- Gmina: Radomsko
- Population: 100

Dąbrówka [dɔmˈbrufka] is a village in the administrative district of Gmina Radomsko, within Radomsko County, Łódź Voivodeship, in central Poland.
