= Grzebień, Łódź Voivodeship =

Grzebień
- Village
- Location within Poland
- Coordinates: 51°1′47″N 19°29′47″E
- Country: Poland
- Voivodeship: Łódź
- County: Radomsko
- Gmina: Radomsko
- Population (approx.): 100

Grzebień [ˈɡʐɛbjɛɲ] is a village in the administrative district of Gmina Radomsko, within Radomsko County, Łódź Voivodeship, in central Poland.

The village has an approximate population of 100.
