= Pechenihy Raion =

Former subdivision of Kharkiv Oblast, Ukraine

Pechenihy Raion Печенізький район
- Raion
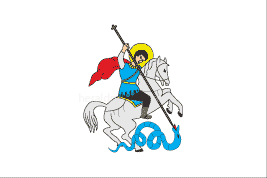
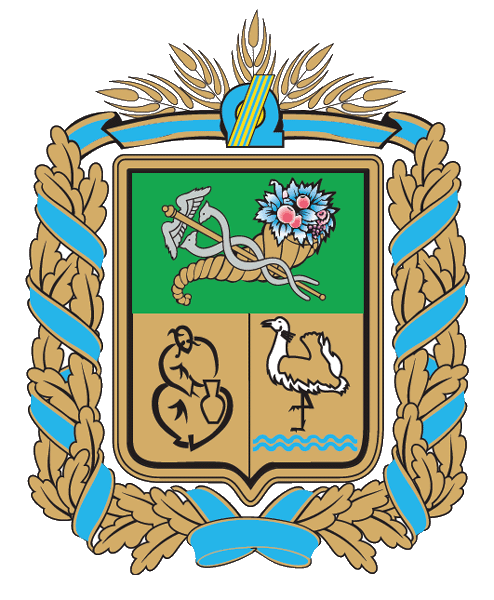
- Flag Coat of arms

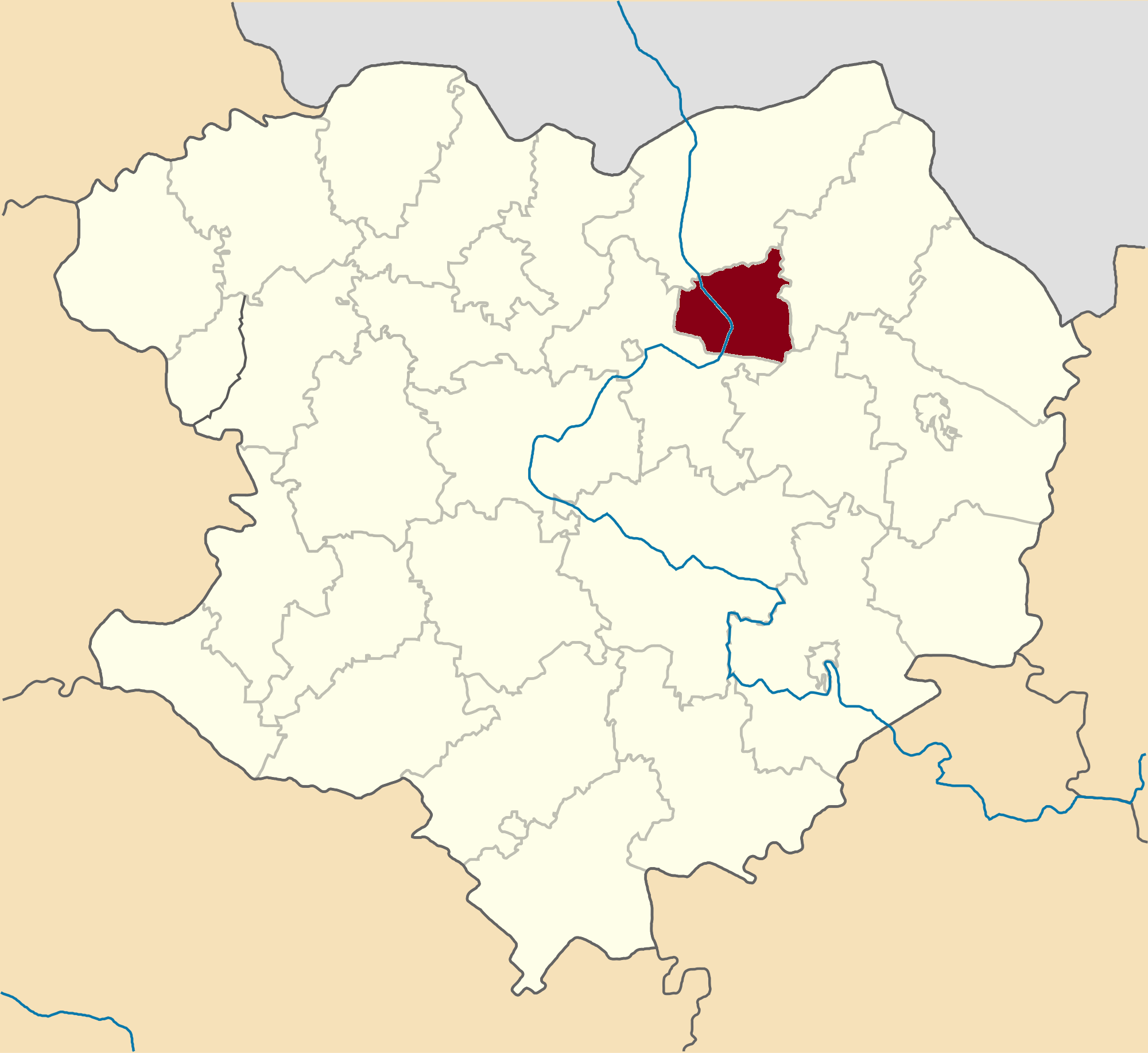
- Raion location in Kharkiv Oblast
- Coordinates: 49°55′17.49″N 37°0′30.9096″E
- Country: Ukraine
- Oblast: Kharkiv Oblast
- Disestablished: 18 July 2020
- Admin. center: Pechenihy

Area
  - Total: 467.5 km^{2} (180.5 sq mi)

Population (2020)
  - Total: 9,617
  - Density: 20.57/km^{2} (53.28/sq mi)
- Time zone: UTC+2 (EET)
  - Summer (DST): UTC+3 (EEST)
- Website: www.kharkivoda.gov.ua

Pechenihy Raion (Ukrainian: Печенізький район) was a raion (district) in Kharkiv Oblast of Ukraine. Its administrative center was the urban-type settlement of Pechenihy. The raion was abolished on 18 July 2020 as part of the administrative reform of Ukraine, which reduced the number of raions of Kharkiv Oblast to seven. The last estimate of the raion population was 9,617 (2020 est.).

After the reform in 2020 Pechenihy raion was substituted by Pechenihy settlement hromada (community) of approximately the same size, and as such it became a part of an enlarged Chuhuiv Raion, with a total population of 202,200

At the time of disestablishment, the raion consisted of one hromada, Pechenihy settlement hromada with the administration in Pechenihy.
