= Amelin, Łódź Voivodeship =

Amelin
- Village
- Location within Poland
- Coordinates: 51°3′32″N 19°30′58″E
- Country: Poland
- Voivodeship: Łódź
- County: Radomsko
- Gmina: Radomsko
- Population: 240

Amelin [aˈmɛlin] is a village in the administrative district of Gmina Radomsko, within Radomsko County, Łódź Voivodeship, in central Poland.
