= Dziepółć =

- Village
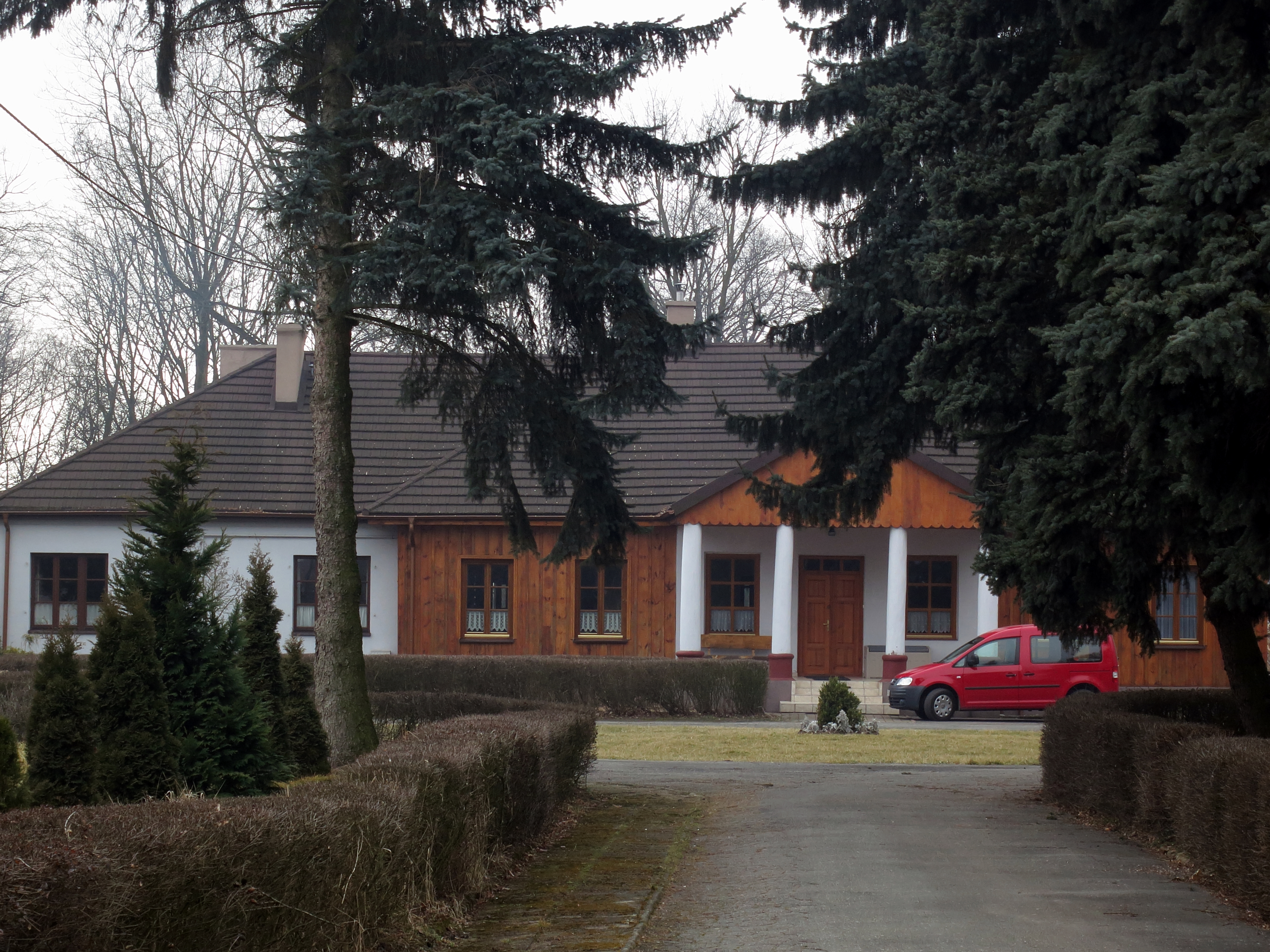
- Manor

- Location within Poland
- Coordinates: 51°3′33″N 19°32′2″E
- Country: Poland
- Voivodeship: Łódź
- County: Radomsko
- Gmina: Radomsko

Dziepółć [ˈd͡ʑɛpuu̯t͡ɕ] is a village in the administrative district of Gmina Radomsko, within Radomsko County, Łódź Voivodeship, in central Poland.
