= Szczepocice Prywatne =

- Village
- Location within Poland
- Coordinates: 51°1′9″N 19°20′35″E
- Country: Poland
- Voivodeship: Łódź
- County: Radomsko
- Gmina: Radomsko

Szczepocice Prywatne [ʂt͡ʂɛpɔˈt͡ɕit͡sɛ prɨˈvatnɛ] is a village in the administrative district of Gmina Radomsko, within Radomsko County, Łódź Voivodeship, in central Poland.
