= Klekowiec =

- Village
- Location within Poland
- Coordinates: 51°0′58″N 19°26′16″E
- Country: Poland
- Voivodeship: Łódź
- County: Radomsko
- Gmina: Radomsko

Klekowiec [klɛˈkɔvjɛt͡s] is a village in the administrative district of Gmina Radomsko, within Radomsko County, Łódź Voivodeship, in central Poland.
