= The Girl or the Vase =

1878 painting by Henryk Siemiradzki

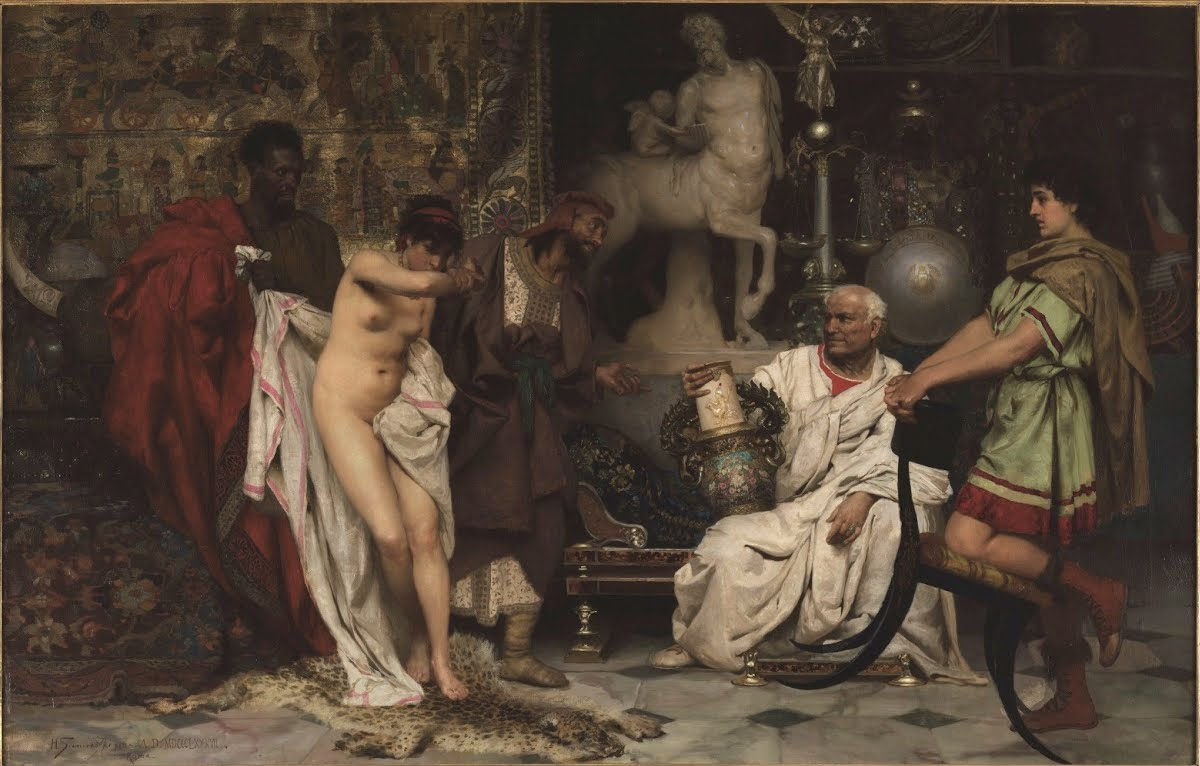
- Artist: Henryk Siemiradzki
- Year: 1878
- Medium: Oil on canvas
- Dimensions: 99 cm × 155.6 cm (39 in × 61.3 in)
- Location: Private collection

The Girl or the Vase (Polish: Wazon czy kobieta), also known as The Presentation of the Slave, is an 1878 painting by the Russian-born Polish artist Henryk Siemiradzki. The subject is from ancient Rome and shows a patrician who contemplates on whether he should buy an East Asian vase or a slave girl. The painting earned Siemiradzki the gold medal at the 1878 World's Fair in Paris and the French Legion of Honour.

The painting last changed owner in 2005, when it was sold through Sotheby's in New York for 1,426,000 dollars.

The painting is referenced in Boris Pasternak's 1957 novel, Doctor Zhivago, described as depicting "[t]he fat Roman making up his mind between the woman and the vase."
