= Brylisko =

- Settlement
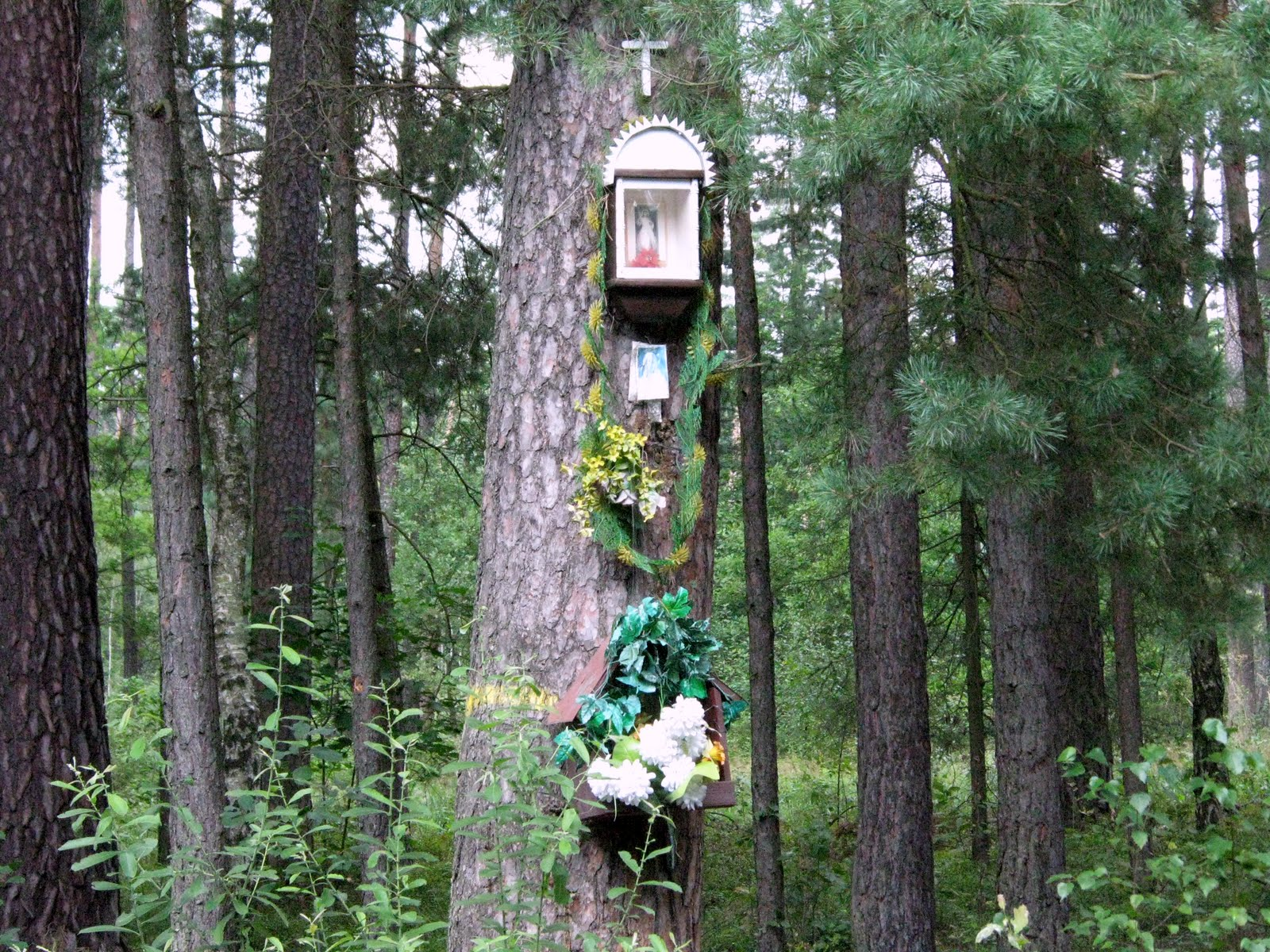

- Location within Poland
- Coordinates: 51°1′21″N 19°27′31″E
- Country: Poland
- Voivodeship: Łódź
- County: Radomsko
- Gmina: Radomsko

Brylisko [brɨˈliskɔ] is a settlement in the administrative district of Gmina Radomsko, within Radomsko County, Łódź Voivodeship, in central Poland.
