= Kietlin, Łódź Voivodeship =

Kietlin
- Village
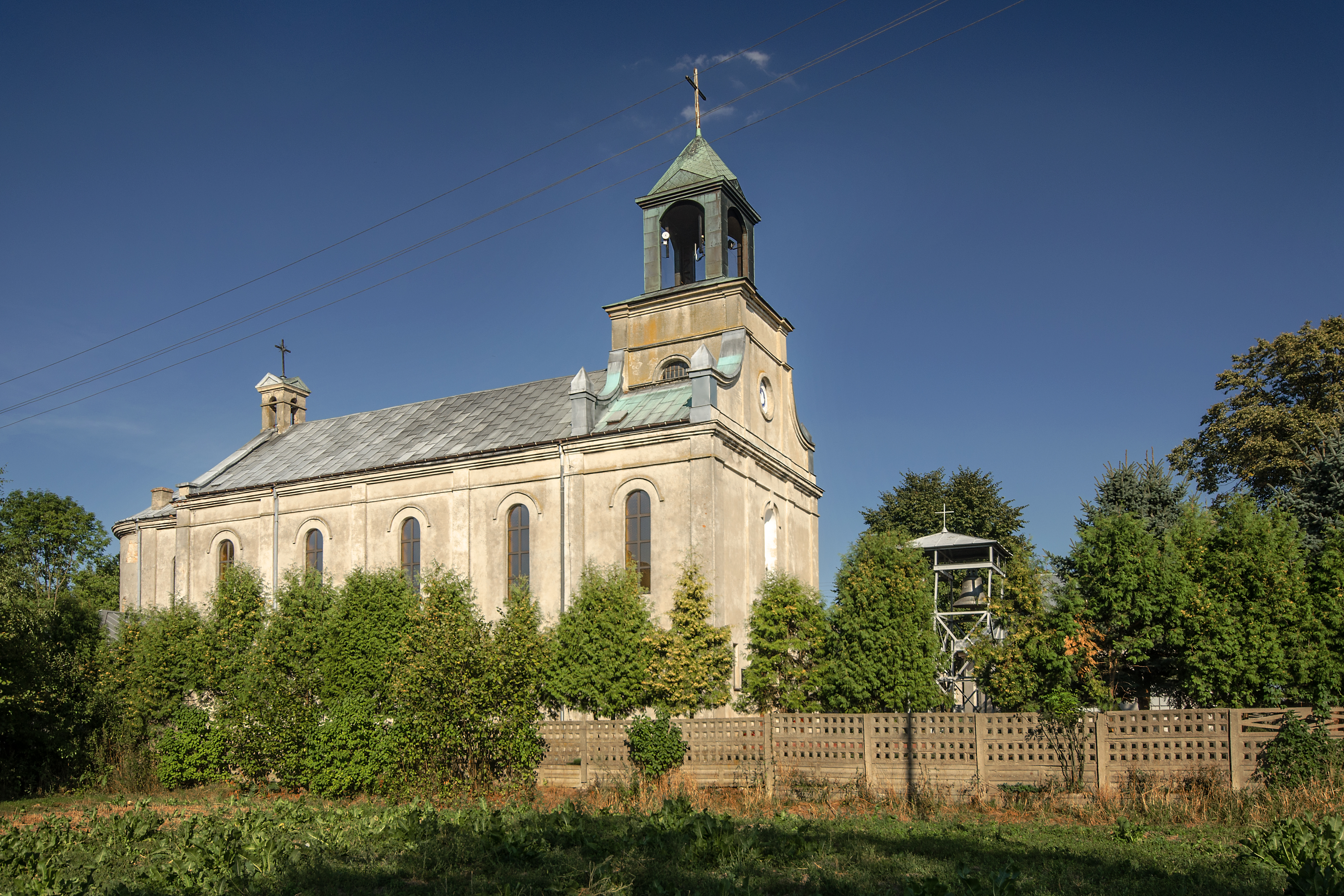
- Holy Trinity church in Kietlin

- Location within Poland
- Coordinates: 51°5′21″N 19°30′16″E
- Country: Poland
- Voivodeship: Łódź
- County: Radomsko
- Gmina: Radomsko
- Vehicle registration: ERA

Kietlin [ˈkʲɛtlin] is a village in the administrative district of Gmina Radomsko, within Radomsko County, Łódź Voivodeship, in south-central Poland.

== History ==
Following the joint German-Soviet invasion of Poland, which started World War II in September 1939, the village was occupied by Germany. In October 1943, the German gendarmerie committed a massacre of 11 people in Kietlin. The victims were three Poles (two men and one woman) and eight Jews (including children), whom they sheltered from the Holocaust.
