= The Sword Dance =

Series of four paintings by Henryk Siemiradzki

The Sword Dance (4 variations)
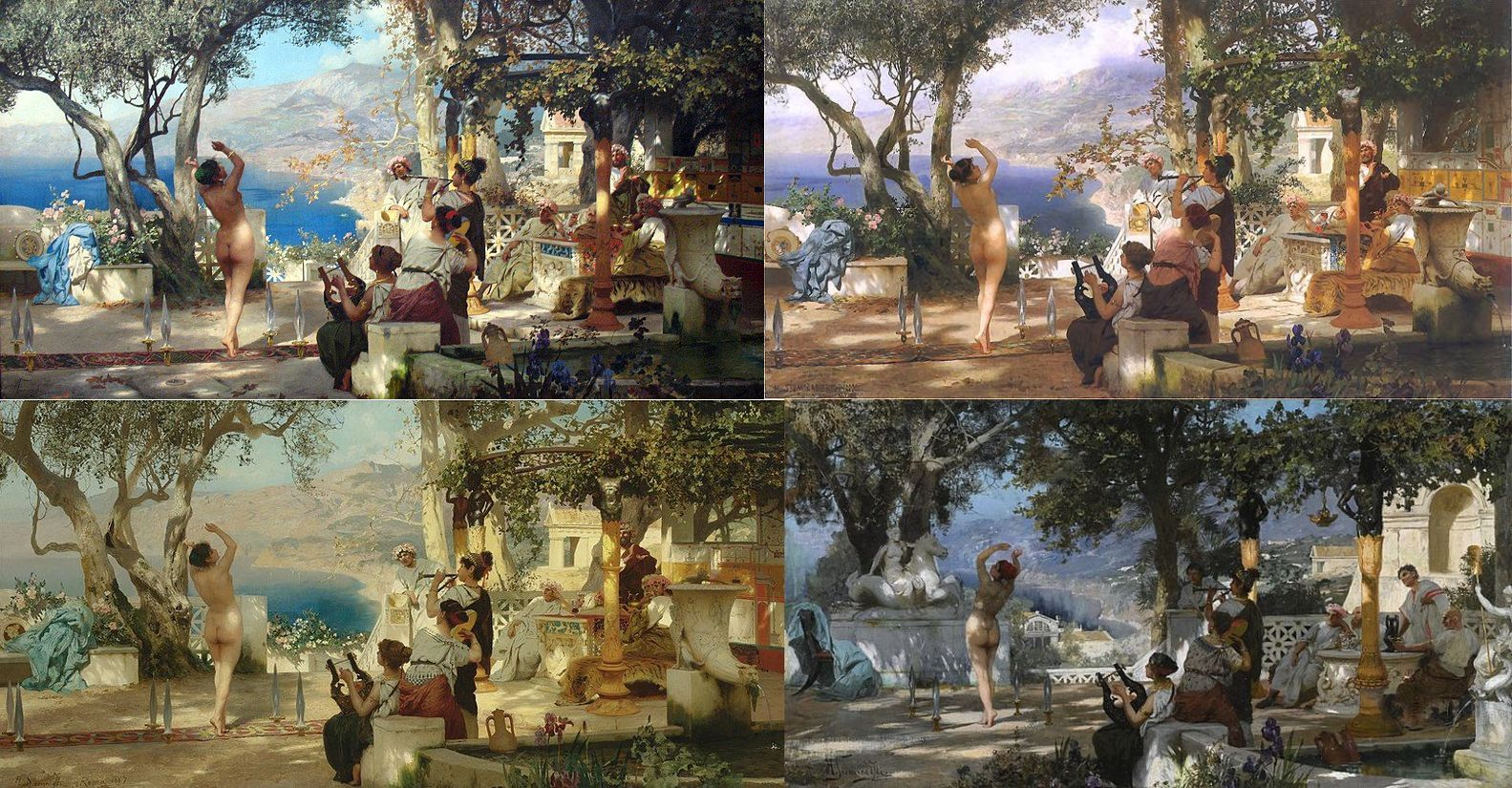
- Artist: Henryk Siemiradzki
- Year: 1881—1898
- Medium: Oil on canvas

The Sword Dance (Polish: Taniec wśród mieczów) is a 19th-century painting series by the Polish and Russian painter Henryk Siemiradzki. It is also known as Dance Amongst Daggers and Dance Amongst Swords, among other names.

== Description ==
The paintings all depict a nude woman who dances between swords that are placed on the ground, while a group of women play music and a few men watch. The setting is Italian, and there have been several interpretations of what exactly the painting depicts.

== Variations ==
Siemiradzki made four versions, each with a slightly different composition and colour scheme. One of the versions, originally commissioned by K. T. Soldatenkov, is located at the Tretyakov Gallery in Moscow. Another version was sold at auction in 2011 for 2,098,500 dollars, which was the new record for a Siemiradzki painting. The record was held until 2013, when Un naufragé mendiant was sold for 1,082,500 Pound sterling. All are painted with oil paint on canvas.

=== Gallery ===
No.	year	size	Museum/collection	image
1.	1881	120 x 225 cm	Tretyakov Gallery	
2.	1881	56.5 x 102 cm	private collection	
3.	1887	77 x 155 cm	private collection	
4.	unknown	unknown	private collection	
