= Lipie, Radomsko County =

Lipie
- Village
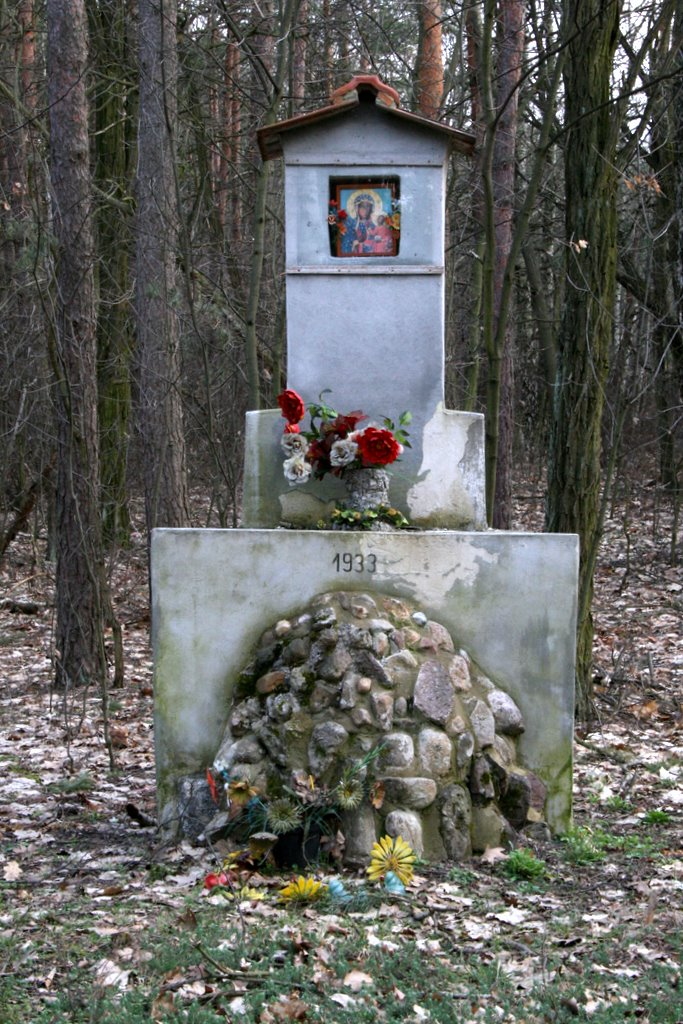

- Location within Poland
- Coordinates: 51°2′35″N 19°24′0″E
- Country: Poland
- Voivodeship: Łódź
- County: Radomsko
- Gmina: Radomsko
- Population: 160

Lipie [ˈlipjɛ] is a village in the administrative district of Gmina Radomsko, within Radomsko County, Łódź Voivodeship, in central Poland.
