= Klekotowe =

- Settlement
- Location within Poland
- Coordinates: 51°2′14″N 19°24′19″E
- Country: Poland
- Voivodeship: Łódź
- County: Radomsko
- Gmina: Radomsko

Klekotowe [klɛkɔˈtɔvɛ] is a settlement in the administrative district of Gmina Radomsko, within Radomsko County, Łódź Voivodeship, in central Poland.
