= Płoszów =

- Village
- Location within Poland
- Coordinates: 51°6′N 19°30′E
- Country: Poland
- Voivodeship: Łódź
- County: Radomsko
- Gmina: Radomsko

Płoszów [ˈpwɔʂuf] is a village in the administrative district of Gmina Radomsko, within Radomsko County, Łódź Voivodeship, in central Poland.
