= Szczepocice Rządowe =

- Village
- Location within Poland
- Coordinates: 51°1′41″N 19°20′24″E
- Country: Poland
- Voivodeship: Łódź
- County: Radomsko
- Gmina: Radomsko

Szczepocice Rządowe [ʂt͡ʂɛpɔˈt͡ɕit͡sɛ ʐɔnˈdɔvɛ] is a village in the administrative district of Gmina Radomsko, within Radomsko County, Łódź Voivodeship, in central Poland.
