= Pechenihy =

Rural locality in Kharkiv Oblast, Ukraine

Pechenihy Печеніги
- Rural settlement
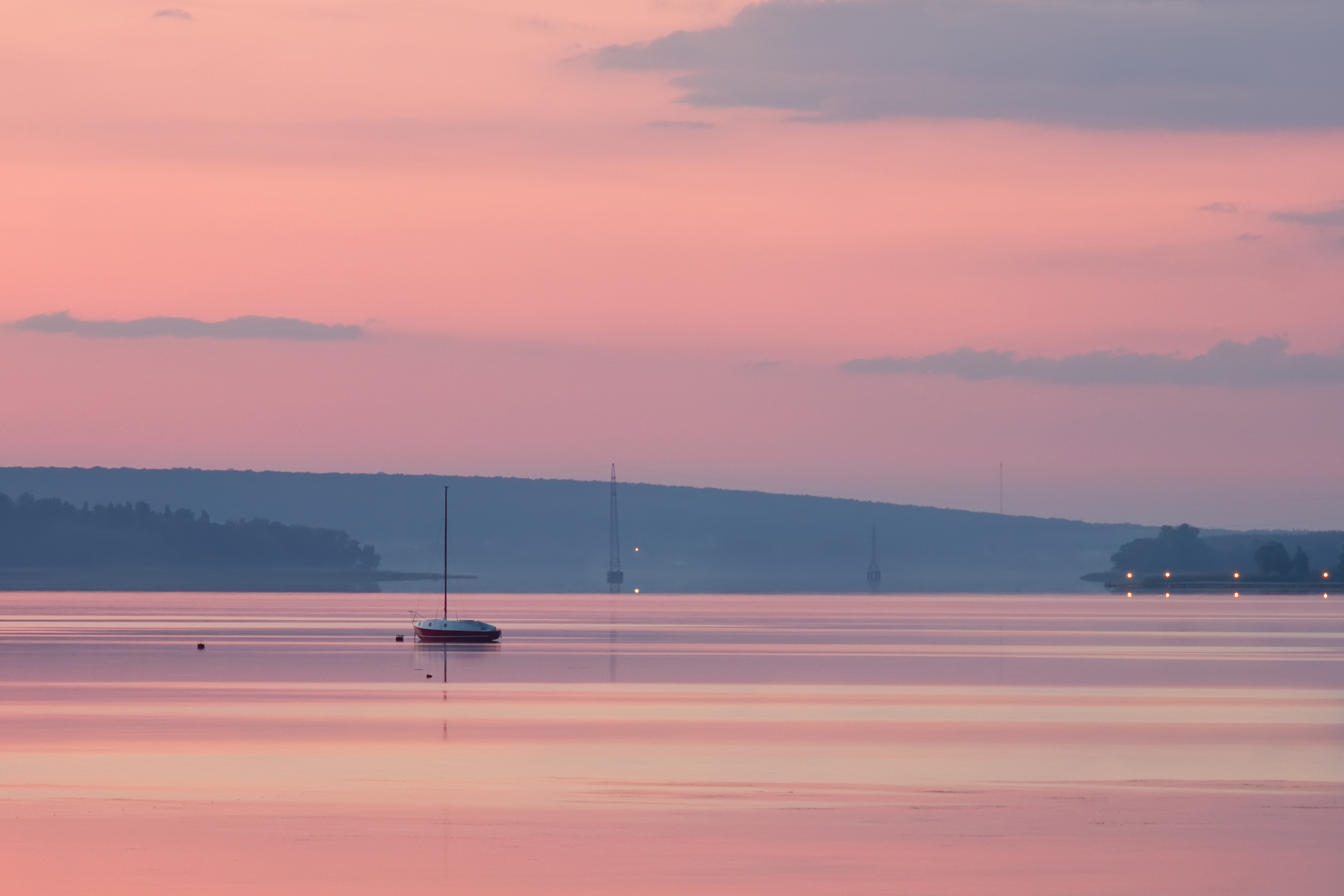

- Location within Ukraine Location within Kharkiv Oblast
- Coordinates: 49°51′53″N 36°55′56″E
- Country: Ukraine
- Oblast: Kharkiv Oblast
- Raion: Chuhuiv Raion

Population (2022)
  - Total: 4,957
- Time zone: UTC+2 (EET)
  - Summer (DST): UTC+3 (EEST)

Pechenihy (Ukrainian: Печеніги, Russian: Печенеги) is a rural settlement in Chuhuiv Raion, Kharkiv Oblast, Ukraine. It hosts the administration of Pechenihy settlement hromada, one of the hromadas of Ukraine. Population: 4,957 (2022 estimate).

Pechenihy is located on the right bank of the Donets.

== History ==
It was a village in Kharkov Governorate of the Russian Empire.

In 1825–1890 the village was called Novo-Bilhorod (Novobilhorod, Novobelgorod).

Urban-type settlement from 1957 to 2024.

In 1958–1962 the Pechenihy Reservoir was built just above the settlement, with the dam located in Pechenihy. The reservoir was built to supply water to the city of Kharkiv.

In January 1989 the population was 5466 people. In January 2013 the population was 5045 people.

Until 18 July 2020, Pechenihy was the administrative center of Pechenihy Raion. The raion was abolished in July 2020 as part of the administrative reform of Ukraine, which reduced the number of raions of Kharkiv Oblast to seven. The area of Pechenihy Raion was merged into Chuhuiv Raion.

Until 26 January 2024, Pechenihy was designated urban-type settlement. On this day, a new law entered into force which abolished this status, and Pechenihy became a rural settlement.

The capital of Turkic Pecheneg Khanate during 895–1036 was possibly located in the area. As originally described by Omeljan Pritsak The Pečenegs: A Case of Social and Economic Transformation, Berlin, Boston: De Gruyter, 1976, as "The previous center, of the ninth century Pecheneg state (in "Lebedia") was probably located in the area of the present-day village Pechenihy in the Kharkiv oblast, where archaeologists have discovered remnants of a Pecheneg encampment, dated to the ninth century. This village was settled by a Slavic population only in 1622, and, in 1708, it became the center of the Pecheneg sotnia of the Izium polk (regiment), and from the 1750s to 1765 it was the center of the Izium sotnia of the Slobodsky polk."

== Transportation ==
Pechenihy is on a paved road connecting Chuhuiv and Velykyi Burluk. There are local roads as well.

The closest railway station is in Chuhuiv, on a railway connecting Kharkiv and Kupiansk.
