= Strzałków, Łódź Voivodeship =

Strzałków
- Village
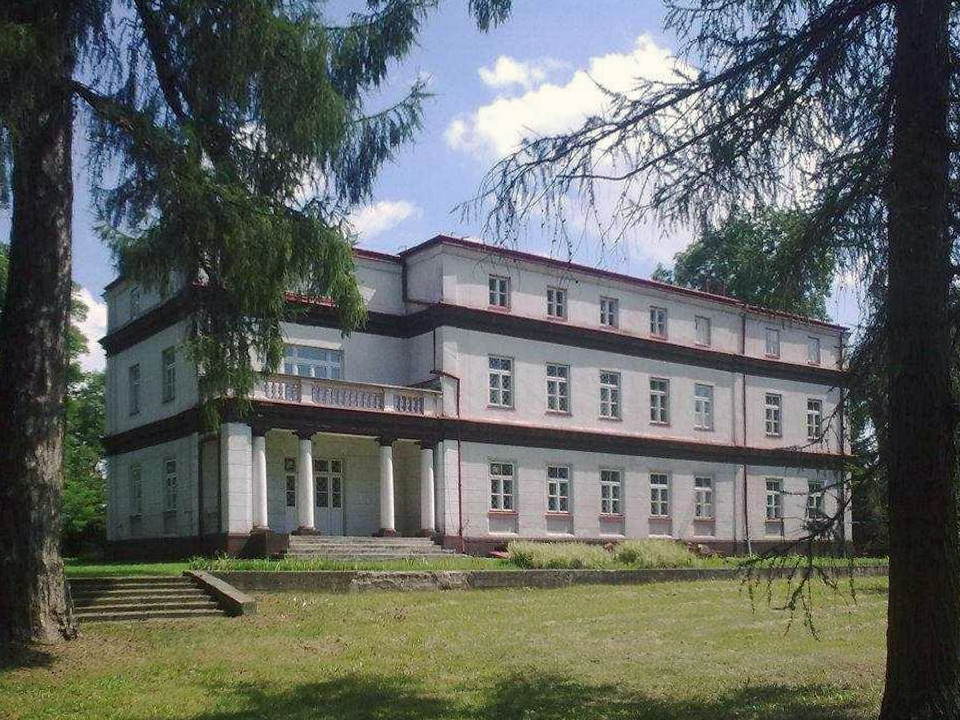
- Manor

- Location within Poland
- Coordinates: 51°3′1″N 19°29′21″E
- Country: Poland
- Voivodeship: Łódź
- County: Radomsko
- Gmina: Radomsko
- Population: 1,100

Strzałków [ˈstʂau̯kuf] is a village in the administrative district of Gmina Radomsko, within Radomsko County, Łódź Voivodeship, in central Poland.
