= Gmina Radomsko =

Gmina Radomsko Radomsko Commune
- Gmina
- Interactive map of Gmina Radomsko
- Coordinates (Radomsko): 51°4′N 19°27′E
- Country: Poland
- Voivodeship: Łódź
- County: Radomsko
- Seat: Radomsko

Area
  - Total: 85.34 km^{2} (32.95 sq mi)

Population (2006)
  - Total: 5,653
  - Density: 66.24/km^{2} (171.6/sq mi)

Gmina Radomsko is a rural gmina (administrative district) in Radomsko County, Łódź Voivodeship, in central Poland. Its seat is the town of Radomsko, although the town is not part of the territory of the gmina.

The gmina covers an area of 85.34 square kilometres (32.9 sq mi), and as of 2006 its total population is 5,653.

== Villages ==
Gmina Radomsko contains the villages and settlements of Amelin, Bobry, Brylisko, Cerkawizna, Dąbrówka, Dziepółć, Grzebień, Kietlin, Klekotowe, Klekowiec, Lipie, Okrajszów, Płoszów, Podcerkawizna, Strzałków, Szczepocice Prywatne and Szczepocice Rządowe.

== Neighbouring gminas ==
Gmina Radomsko is bordered by the town of Radomsko and by the gminas of Dobryszyce, Gidle, Gomunice, Kobiele Wielkie, Kodrąb, Kruszyna and Ładzice.
