= Gmina Zawadzkie =

Gmina Zawadzkie Zawadzkie Commune
- Gmina
- Coat of arms
- Interactive map of Gmina Zawadzkie
- Coordinates (Zawadzkie): 50°36′34″N 18°28′48″E
- Country: Poland
- Voivodeship: Opole
- County: Strzelce
- Seat: Zawadzkie

Area
  - Total: 82.24 km^{2} (31.75 sq mi)

Population (2019-06-30)
  - Total: 11,341
  - Density: 137.9/km^{2} (357.2/sq mi)
  - Urban: 1,735
  - Rural: 4,206
- Time zone: UTC+1 (CET)
  - Summer (DST): UTC+2 (CEST)
- Vehicle registration: OST
- Website: http://www.zawadzkie.pl

Gmina Zawadzkie is an urban-rural gmina (administrative district) in Strzelce County, Opole Voivodeship, in southern Poland. Its seat is the town of Zawadzkie, which lies approximately 19 kilometres (12 mi) north-east of Strzelce Opolskie and 40 km (25 mi) east of the regional capital Opole.

The gmina covers an area of 82.24 square kilometres (31.8 sq mi), and as of 2019 its total population is 11,341.

== Villages ==
Apart from the town of Zawaszkie, the gmina also contains the villages of Kielcza and Żędowice.

== Neighbouring gminas ==
Gmina Zawadzkie is bordered by the gminas of Dobrodzień, Jemielnica, Kolonowskie, Krupski Młyn, Pawonków and Wielowieś.

== Twin towns – sister cities ==
Gmina Zawadzkie is twinned with:

- Bockenem, Germany
- Chortkiv, Ukraine
- Dubnica nad Váhom, Slovakia
- Otrokovice, Czech Republic
- Uebigau-Wahrenbrück, Germany
- Vác, Hungary
