= Szczepanów, Lesser Poland Voivodeship =

Szczepanów
- Village
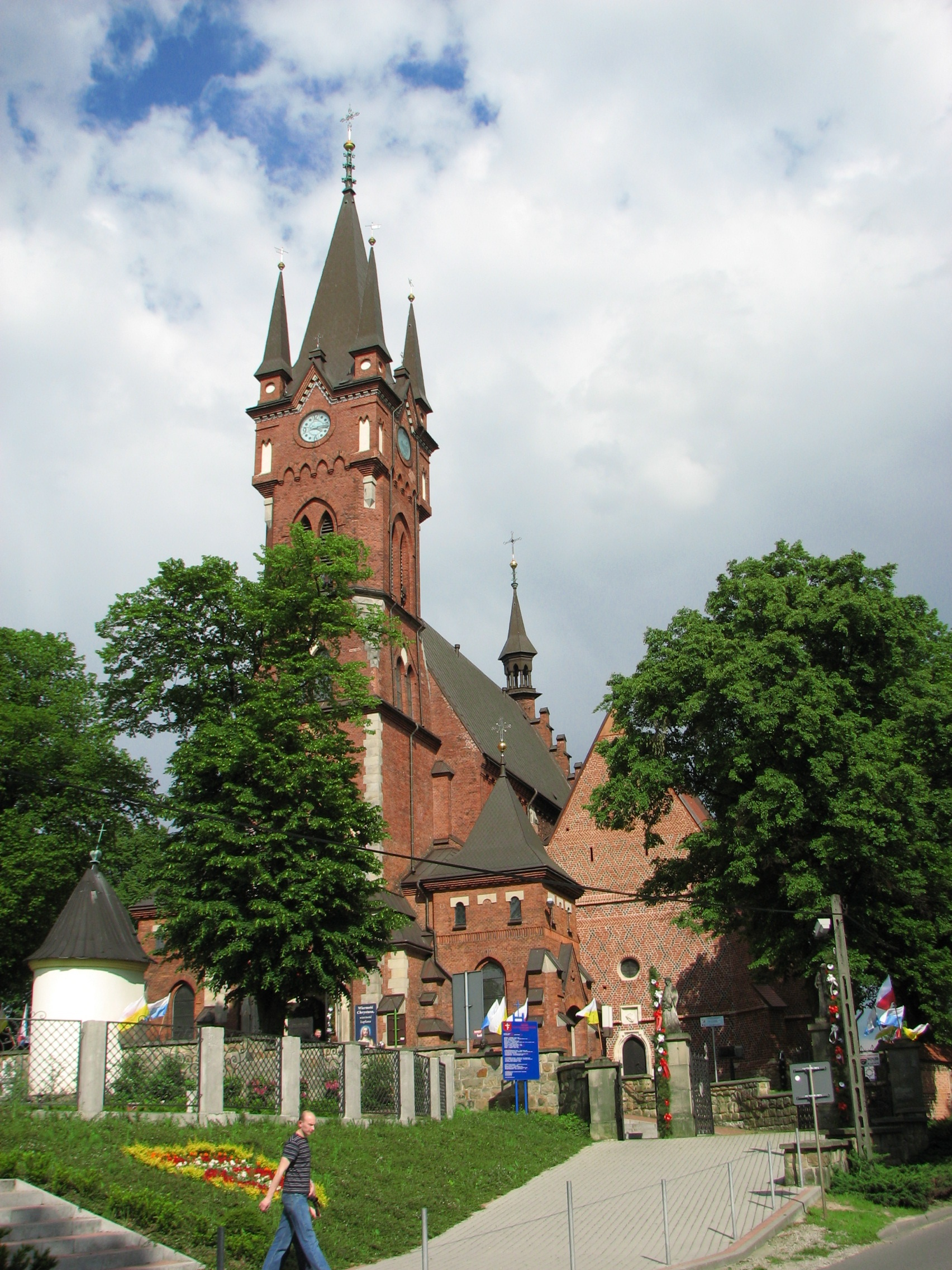
- On the right, the church of St. Mary Magdalene, on the left the church of St. Stanislaus

- Location within Poland
- Coordinates: 50°0′19″N 20°39′20″E
- Country: Poland
- Voivodeship: Lesser Poland
- County: Brzesko
- Gmina: Brzesko
- Population: 949

Szczepanów [ʂt͡ʂɛˈpanuf] is a village in the administrative district of Gmina Brzesko, within Brzesko County, Lesser Poland Voivodeship, in southern Poland.

It was the birthplace of Stanislaus of Szczepanów - 11th Century Bishop of Kraków who was martyred by the Polish king Bolesław II the Bold and became venerated in the Roman Catholic Church as Saint Stanislaus the Martyr.

== Landmarks ==
- Church of Mary Magdalene. Founded by Odrowąża Yvonne Bishop of Cracow. In the thirteenth century Vincent of Kielcza, described this building as a wooden structure but by 1470 Jan Długosz described a stone church. The church building was damaged on 23 November 1914 as a result of World War I.
- The church of St. Mary Magdalene and St. Stanisława is a Gothic Revival building, designed by architect and professor at the Lwów Polytechnic, Jan Sas-Zubrzycki. It was built between 1911–1914 and has a five-storey tower.
- Szczepanów Market.
- The historic parish cemetery and also a military cemetery from World War I.
