= Sindbad (company) =

Polish transportation company

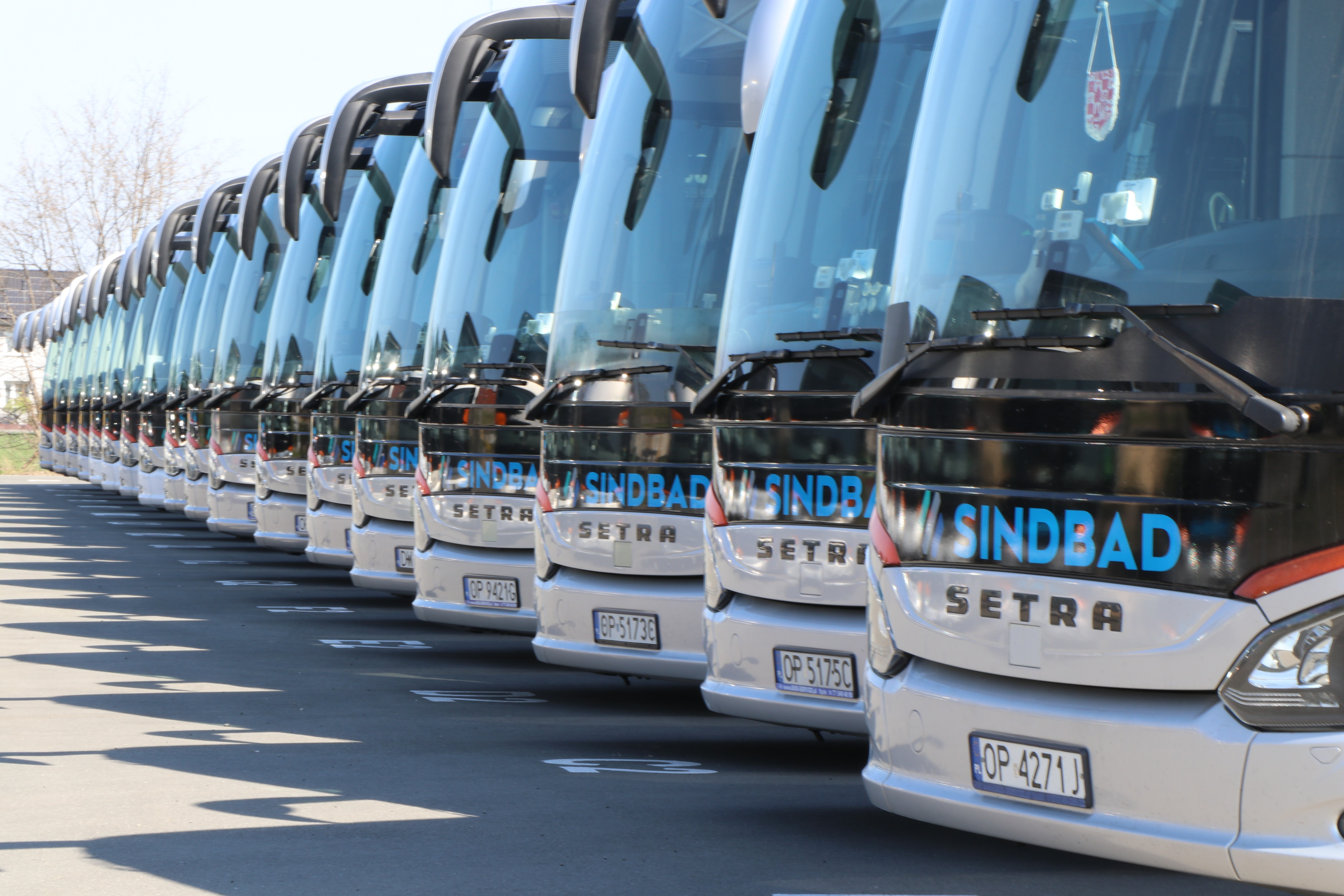
- Sindbad coaches in 2020
- Company type: Limited liability company
- Industry: Transportation, tourism
- Founded: 1983
- Headquarters: 4 Działkowa Street, Opole, Poland
- Area served: Europe
- Key people: Ryszard Wójcik (president)
- Services: International coach services, travel agency
- Website: www.sindbad.pl

Sindbad (until 2009 Sindbad Private Travel Agency) is a Polish transportation company based in Opole, founded in 1983. It specializes in international coach services across Europe.

Originally established as a private travel agency facilitating visa applications, Sindbad began organizing coach services from southern Poland to West Germany in the mid-1980s. Following the abolition of visa requirements for Poles in Western Europe in the 1990s, international coach transport became its main business. From 1990, the company also offered international holiday packages, starting with trips to Italy. In 2004, Sindbad expanded its routes to include countries beyond Germany, such as the Benelux countries, France, United Kingdom, and Austria. In 2006, it initiated a cooperative platform with other coach operators, forming the Sindbad long-distance coach network, which by 2019 included 30 Polish and 50 foreign carriers. By 2020, Sindbad operated over 120 owned coaches and 200 partner vehicles.

== History ==
Sindbad Private Travel Agency was founded in 1983 in Opole by Ryszard Wójcik. The company received approval from the Opole City Office to conduct tourism activities within Poland and to assist with visa applications, with the latter being its main revenue source. The agency facilitated all formalities for travel to Western Europe, primarily to West Germany.

In the mid-1980s, Sindbad began operating coach services to West Germany. Due to legal restrictions, it initially leased coaches from external operators, such as Turysta, which withdrew from the agreement after 10 days to operate its own services to Germany. Sindbad then partnered with carriers including Juventur, PKS Brzeg, the Sports and Recreation Centre in Twardogóra, and the Lower Silesian Sports and Recreation Centre in Wrocław. One coach included amenities such as an onboard toilet and VCR. Sindbad's services grew in demand due to competitive pricing compared to rail travel and the emigration of Poles, particularly from Silesia, traveling to Western Europe in the 1980s. In the late 1980s, Sindbad collaborated with German operator Palm Reisen, owned by Hubert Palm, which handled parcel transport between Poland and West Germany. In March 1989, Palm Reisen purchased a Setra coach exclusively for Sindbad's use, marking its first dedicated vehicle. Customer service points were established in Brühl and Pforzheim, Germany. By 1990, Sindbad's coaches served six locations in West Germany, and the joint venture Sindbad Palm Reisen was formed in Germany.

Following the abolition of visa requirements for Poles in many European countries in the early 1990s, visa intermediation, Sindbad's primary activity, declined, prompting the company to focus on international coach services. In 1990, the company purchased three coaches – two Volvo and one Scania – for 90,000 DM. That year, it also began offering coach trips to Italy's Adriatic coast, specifically to Lido delle Nazioni, with departures every other day during summer. Over two seasons, more than 6,000 passengers traveled to Italy. In 1991, two DAF coaches were added to the fleet. By 1992, international coach transport became Sindbad's main activity.

By 1998, Sindbad operated services to 28 German cities, with departures from southwestern Poland five times weekly to Germany and six times to Poland. From 2000, services ran daily in both directions. The company also offered holiday packages in Spain and Croatia and tours to the UK, France, Benelux, Spain, and Norway. In 2000, its fleet comprised 50 coaches, including five double-deckers, with 50 drivers and 100 tour guides. In December 2004, Sindbad significantly expanded its network to include daily services to the UK, Belgium, Netherlands, Luxembourg, France, and Austria. In 2006, Sindbad partnered with three Polish carriers – Albatros (Przemyśl), Riviera (Opole), and Janosik (Rzeszów) – forming the Sindbad platform, which sells tickets for multiple operators under a single brand. That year, Sindbad owned 57 coaches, leased 19, and operated 32 partner vehicles, while adding routes to Spain and Switzerland.

Since 2009, the company has operated under the name Sindbad. In 2012, Sindbad, alongside Raf Trans (Warsaw), served as an official carrier for UEFA Euro 2012 in Poland. In 2016, it transported teams for the 2016 European Men's Handball Championship in Poland. By 2012, the Sindbad platform offered direct connections from Poland to Germany, France, Netherlands, Belgium, Luxembourg, UK, Denmark, Norway, Sweden, Austria, Switzerland, Spain, Czech Republic, Slovakia, Italy, Hungary, Bulgaria, and Greece. In 2015, Sindbad acquired Biuro Turystyczne Nord in Gdynia, which had been part of the Sindbad platform since 2010. In 2016, Sindbad merged with the competing Polish platform Eurobus, integrating ticket sales and passenger services under the Sindbad – Eurobus brand from May 2016. The combined network covered 200 Polish towns and over 500 European cities across 27 countries, with over 300 coaches. The merger facilitated entry into the Poland-Ukraine market. In 2017, Sindbad partnered with foreign carriers, including Spain's Alsa, Moldova's Lux-Reisen, and Switzerland's Eurolines. In 2018, agreements were signed with Deutsche Touring (Eurolines in Germany), Becker Reisen, Isilines, and Transdev, granting Sindbad exclusive rights to the Eurolines brand in Poland. That year, Polish carrier Agat joined the platform, expanding connections to over 700 cities in 28 European countries. In 2018, for its 35th anniversary, Sindbad introduced a new coach livery, discontinuing the Eurobus logo. In 2019, the company opened a new coach hub in Opole for passenger transfers across its network.

== Operations ==
=== International coach services ===
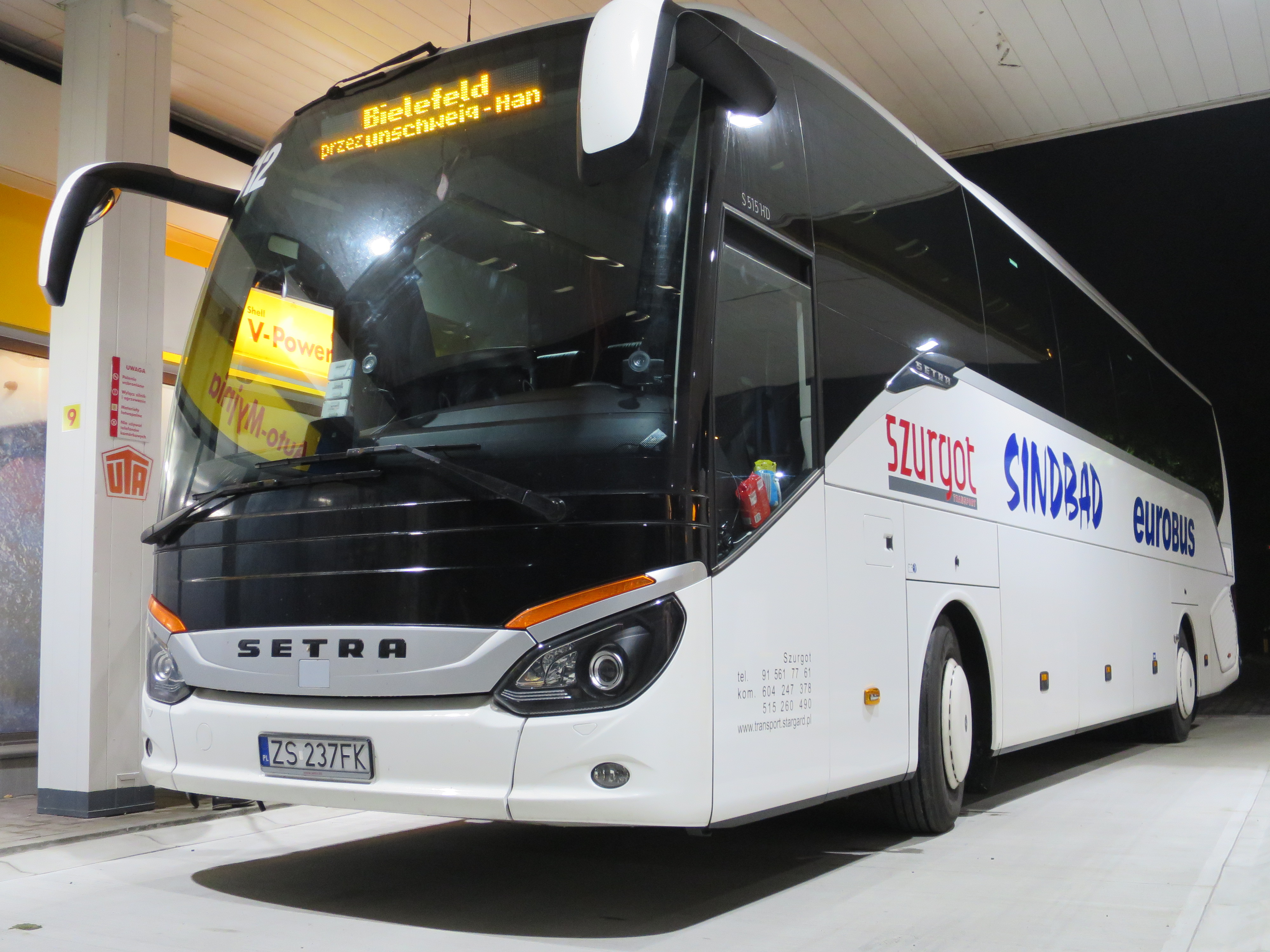
Coach operated by Szurgot within the Sindbad platform

The Sindbad platform provides coach services to over 500 cities in 28 European countries, with departures from 200 Polish towns. It collaborates with Polish carriers like Agat (Katowice), Orland (Żędowice), Riviera (Opole), and Albatros (Przemyśl), as well as foreign operators such as Deutsche Touring (Eurolines), Becker Reisen, National Express Coaches, and Alsa, totaling 30 Polish and 50 foreign carriers.

Sindbad operates two main transfer hubs in Poland: one in Opole (previously in Gliwice at the PKS station) for southern Poland, and one in Słubice for the northern region. Coaches converge at these hubs in the evening for approximately 30-minute transfers, with passengers switching to their destination-bound coaches. Return trips to Poland follow a similar morning schedule. The Opole hub, opened in 2018, spans 1.5 hectares and can accommodate up to 36 coaches simultaneously.

Coaches are equipped with onboard tour guides, free Wi-Fi, 230V power outlets, air conditioning, toilets, mini-bars, and DVD systems, along with electronic safety systems. Annually, the platform transports over one million passengers, with approximately 60% traveling between Poland and Germany.

=== Travel agency ===
Sindbad operates a travel agency, offering international holidays, group trips (including school excursions), airline ticket sales, and logistical support for corporate travel.

=== Fleet ===
Sindbad's fleet consists of over 120 coaches, primarily Setra, with an average age of under three years (as of March 2020). Coach capacities range from 16 to 87 seats. Partner operators within the platform contribute over 200 coaches, mostly Setra. The company also rents out coaches.

=== Employment ===
In 2018, the Sindbad platform employed 2,500 people, including 1,500 drivers, 200 tour guides, and 500 office staff.

== Awards and recognitions ==
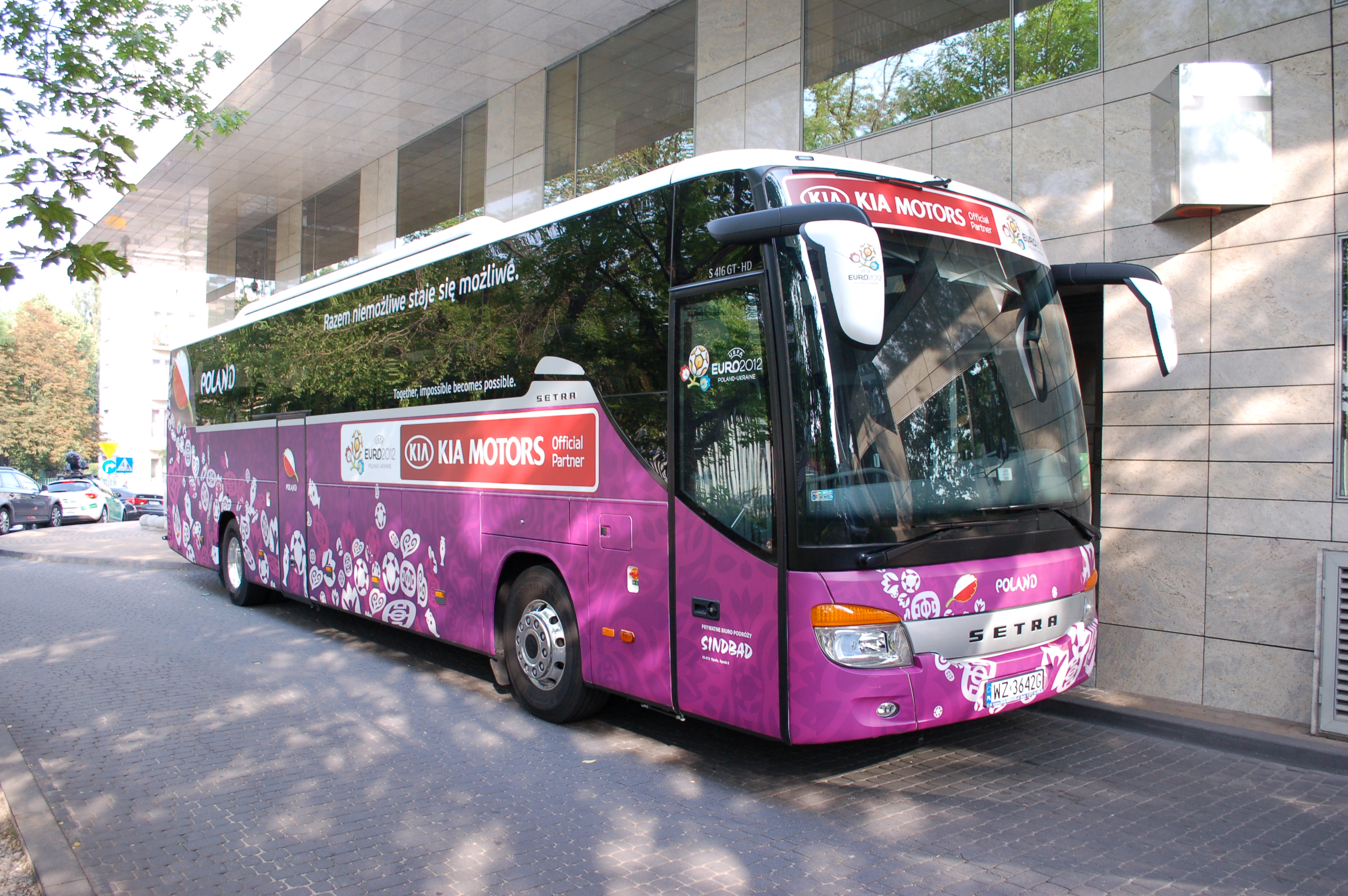
Setra S 416 GT-HD operated by Sindbad during UEFA Euro 2012

Sindbad has received several awards:

- Golden Laurel of Skills and Competence, 1999
- Certificate of Recognition from the Ministry of Economy For Contributions to Tourism, 2001
- Malwa Awards: Distinction 1999, Bronze 2000, Silver 2001, Gold 2004
- Opolska Marka 2004 – Service of the Year
- European Medal: 2005, 2007
- Leader of Polish Tourism, 2006
- Gazele Biznesu: 2006–2013
- Quality of Service Award, 2008 – Top 100 Customer-Friendly Companies in Poland
- Leader of Polish Business, 2008 – Business Centre Club
- Nomination for Teraz Polska Award, 2009
- Business Credibility Certificate, 2011 – D&B Poland
- Good Company, 2012 – Top 20 Fastest-Growing Companies, Rzeczpospolita
- Certificate of Excellence, 2013 – Scandlines
- Forbes Diamond, 2013 – Most Dynamic Value Growth
- Certificate of Recognition from the Ministry of Sport and Tourism For Contributions to Tourism, 2013
- List of 500 Largest Polish Entrepreneurs – „Sukces” Magazine
- Entrepreneur for Children – Business Centre Club
- Company Investing in Staff Award

Sindbad served as an official carrier for UEFA Euro 2012, the 2016 European Men's Handball Championship, and events such as Miss World and Miss Polonia.
