= Church of St. Michael the Archangel and St. Stanislaus Bishop and Martyr, Kraków =

Roman Catholic church in Kraków, Poland

Church of St. Michael the Archangel and St. Stanislaus Bishop and Martyr
- Kościół św. Michała Archanioła i św. Stanisława Biskupa i Męczennika
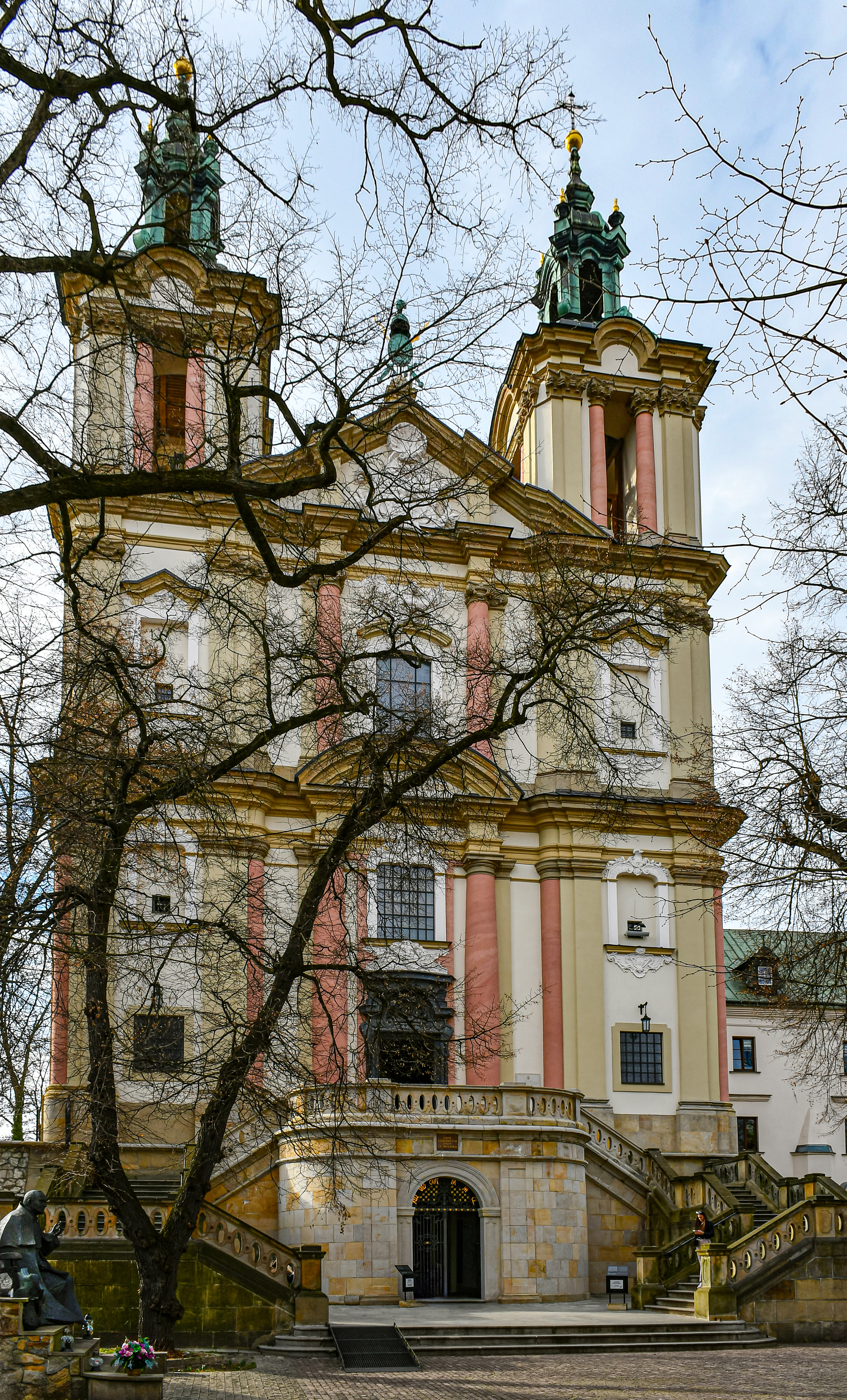
- The façade of the church and entrance to the Pantheon
- Church of St. Michael the Archangel and St. Stanislaus Bishop and Martyr
- 50°02′54.5″N 19°56′15.5″E
- Location: Kraków
- Address: 15 Skałeczna Street
- Country: Poland
- Denomination: Roman Catholic
- Website: https://skalka.paulini.pl/

UNESCO World Heritage Site
- Type: Cultural
- Criteria: iv
- Designated: 1978
- Part of: Historic Centre of Kraków
- Reference no.: 29
- Region: Europe and North America

Historic Monument of Poland
- Designated: 1994-09-08
- Part of: Kraków historical city complex
- Reference no.: M.P. 1994 nr 50 poz. 418

The Church of St. Michael the Archangel and St. Stanislaus Bishop and Martyr (Polish: Kościół św. Michała Archanioła i św. Stanisława Biskupa i Męczennika), known colloquially as the Church on the Rock (Polish: Kościół na Skałce) and Small Rock (Polish: Skałka) is a historic Roman Catholic conventual church of the Order of Saint Paul the First Hermit located at 15 Skałeczna Street in Kazimierz, the former district of Kraków, Poland.

From left to right: church, Pauline Fathers convent, Obelisk of the Three Sacraments and Altar of the Three Millenniums

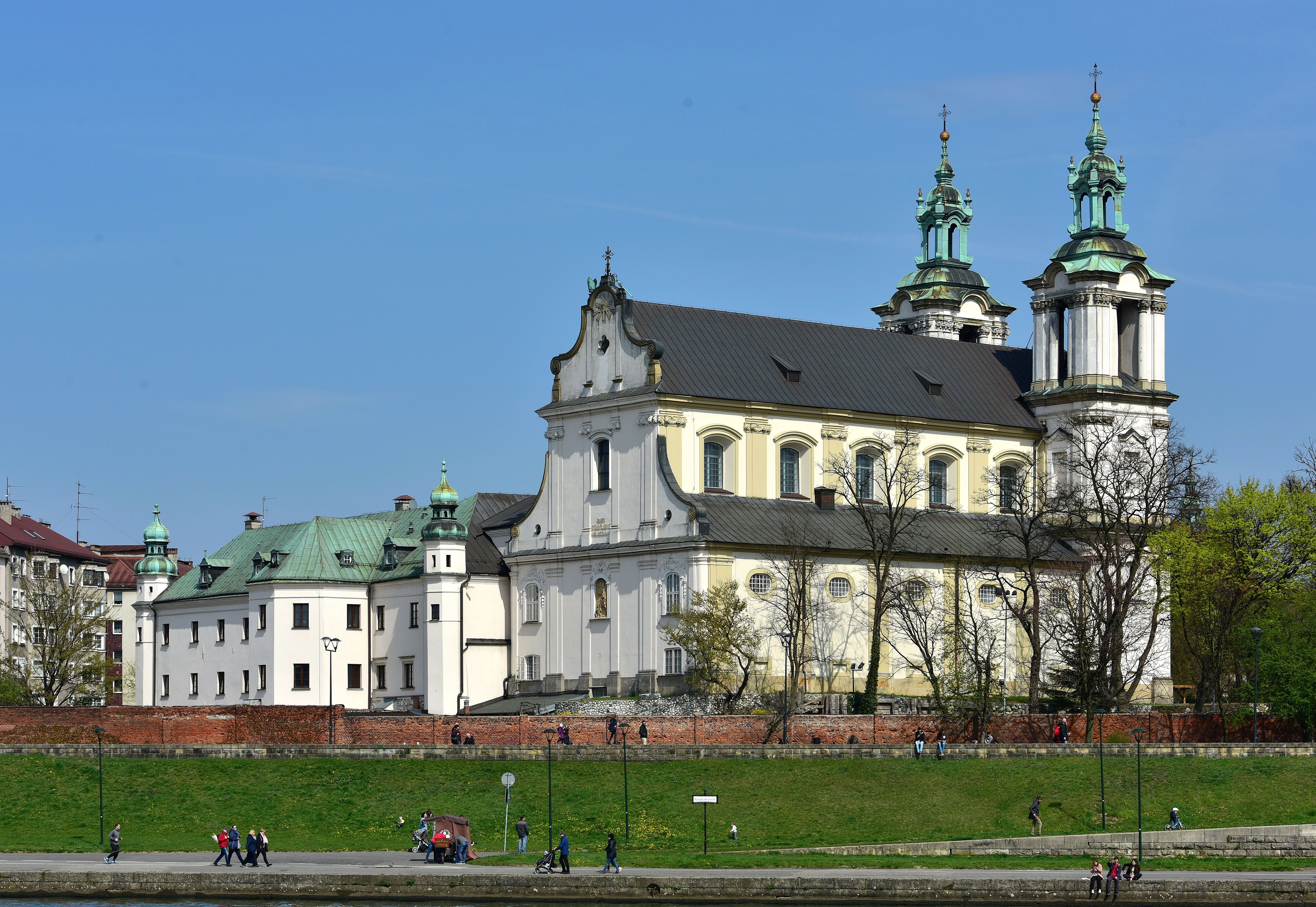
View of the monastery from the Vistula River

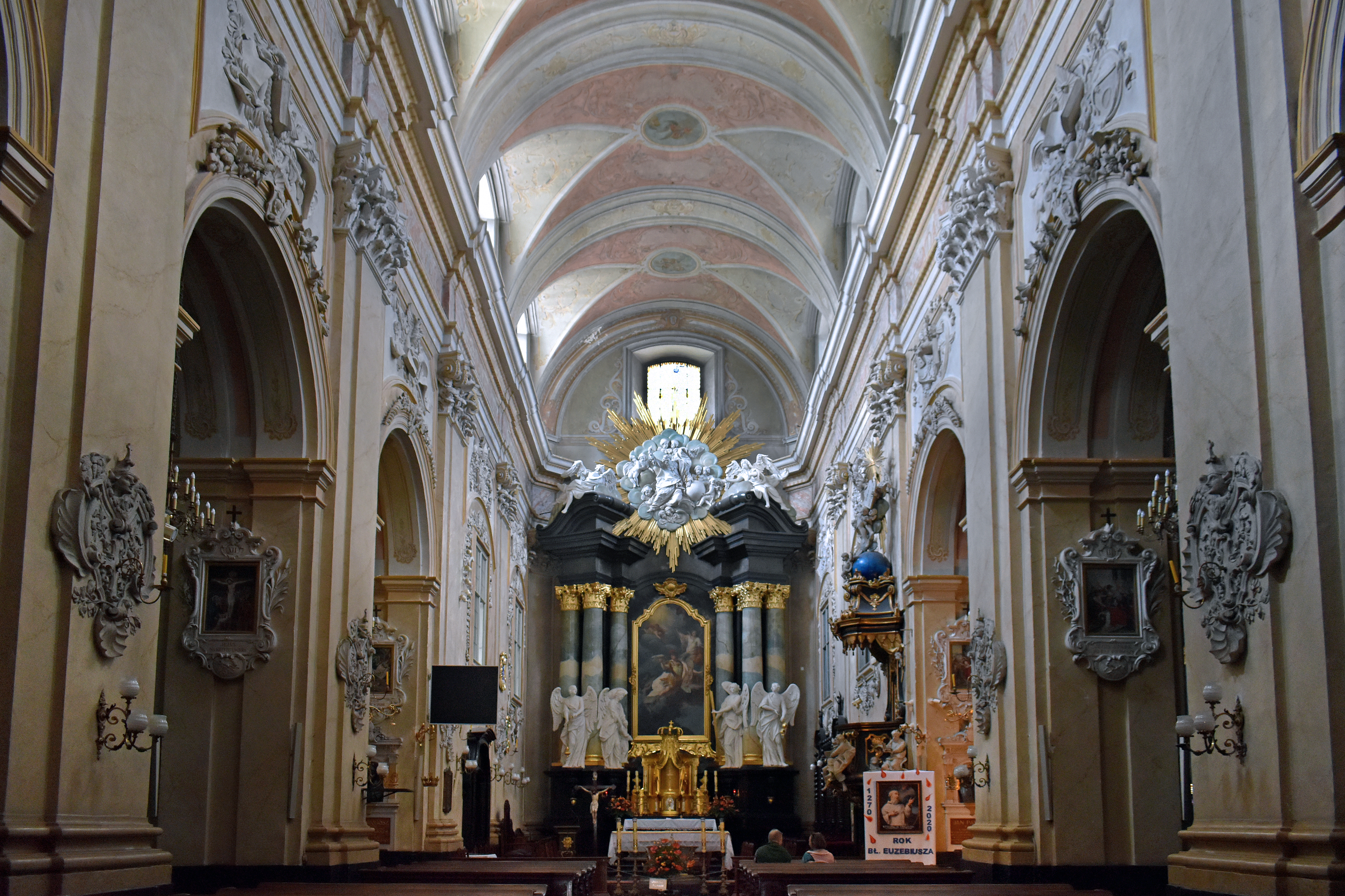
Interior of church

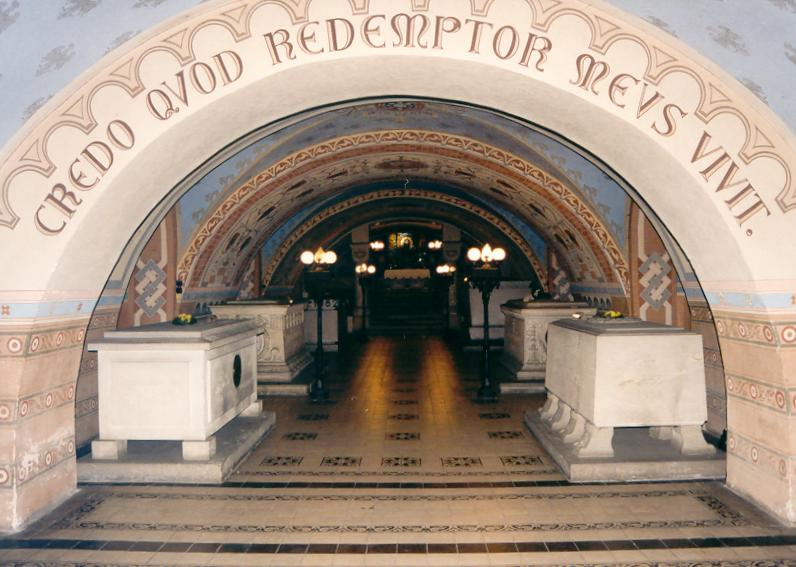
Crypts of distinguished Poles and Cracovians

Skałeczna Street and monastery gate

The crypt beneath the church serves as a Panthéon to distinguished Poles and citizens of Kraków. It is said to be the place where Saint Stanislaus of Szczepanów, Bishop of Kraków, was slain by the order of Polish king Bolesław II the Bold in 1079. This action resulted in the king's exile and the eventual canonization of the slain bishop.

== History ==
Located on the Vistula River south of Wawel, Skałka was part of the island city of Kazimierz until the nineteenth century, when the Old Vistula River was filled in.

The original church was built in the Romanesque style. King Casimir III replaced it with a Gothic church, and since 1472 that shrine has been in the possession of a monastic community of Pauline Fathers. In 1733–1751 the church received Baroque decor. It is one of the most famous Polish sanctuaries.

The Pauline "Church on the Rock" is primarily associated with the martyrdom of Saint Stanisław of Szczepanów. Each newly elected King of Poland made a pilgrimage to Skałka on the eve of his coronation as penance for the disgraceful action of his predecessor who had personally killed St. Stanisław.

== Interior ==
The crypt underneath the church serves as one of Poland's "National Panthéons" (alongside the Wawel Cathedral, St. John's Archcathedral and the Church of Saint Peter and Paul), a burial place for some of the most distinguished Poles, particularly those who lived in Kraków.

- Jan Długosz (1415–1480), diplomat and historian
- Wincenty Pol (1807–1872), poet, geographer and freedom fighter
- Lucjan Siemieński (1809–1877), poet, writer and freedom fighter
- Józef Ignacy Kraszewski (1812–1887), writer and historian
- Teofil Lenartowicz (1822–1893), poet and sculptor
- Adam Asnyk (1838–1897), poet, playwright and freedom fighter
- Henryk Siemiradzki (1843–1902), painter
- Stanisław Wyspiański (1869–1907) poet, playwright and painter
- Jacek Malczewski (1854–1929), painter
- Karol Szymanowski (1882–1937), composer and pianist
- Ludwik Solski (1855–1954), theatre actor and director
- Tadeusz Banachiewicz (1882–1954), astronomer and mathematician
- Czesław Miłosz (1911–2004), poet and essayist, Nobel Prize recipient

== Exterior ==
Outside the church is the Well of Saint Stanislaus. According to legend, this well is where King Bolesław discarded the bishop's dismembered body, which then miraculously reassembled. Water from the well is dispensed from a fountain for pilgrims to drink.

In 2008, the Pauline fathers added the open-air Altar of the Three Millennia, with statues representing seven important people in Polish history.

- Augustyn Kordecki (1603–1673), prior of Jasna Góra Monastery during the Siege of Jasna Góra
- Jadwiga of Poland (1374–1399), first female monarch of the Kingdom of Poland
- Adalbert of Prague (956–997), bishop of Prague and martyr
- Stanislaus of Szczepanów (1030–1079), bishop of Kraków and martyr
- Pope John Paul II (1920–2005), archbishop of Kraków, elected Pope in 1978
- Faustina Kowalska (1905–1938), nun whose mystical revelations inspired the Divine Mercy devotion
- Jan Kanty (1390–1473), priest and professor of philosophy and theology at the Kraków Academy

Six of these people (the exception being Kordecki) are venerated as saints in the Catholic Church.

== See also ==
- Wawel Cathedral
- Saints Peter and Paul's Church in Kraków

== Bibliography ==
- (in Polish) * Michał Rożek, Barbara Gądkowa Leksykon kościołów Krakowa, Wydawnictwo Verso, Kraków 2003, ISBN 83-919281-0-1 pp 112-114 (Lexicon of Krakow churches)
- (in Polish) * Praca zbiorowa Encyklopedia Krakowa, wydawca Biblioteka Kraków i Muzeum Krakowa, Kraków 2023, ISBN 978-83-66253-46-9 volume I pp 751-752 (Encyclopedia of Krakow)
