= Bockenem =

- Town
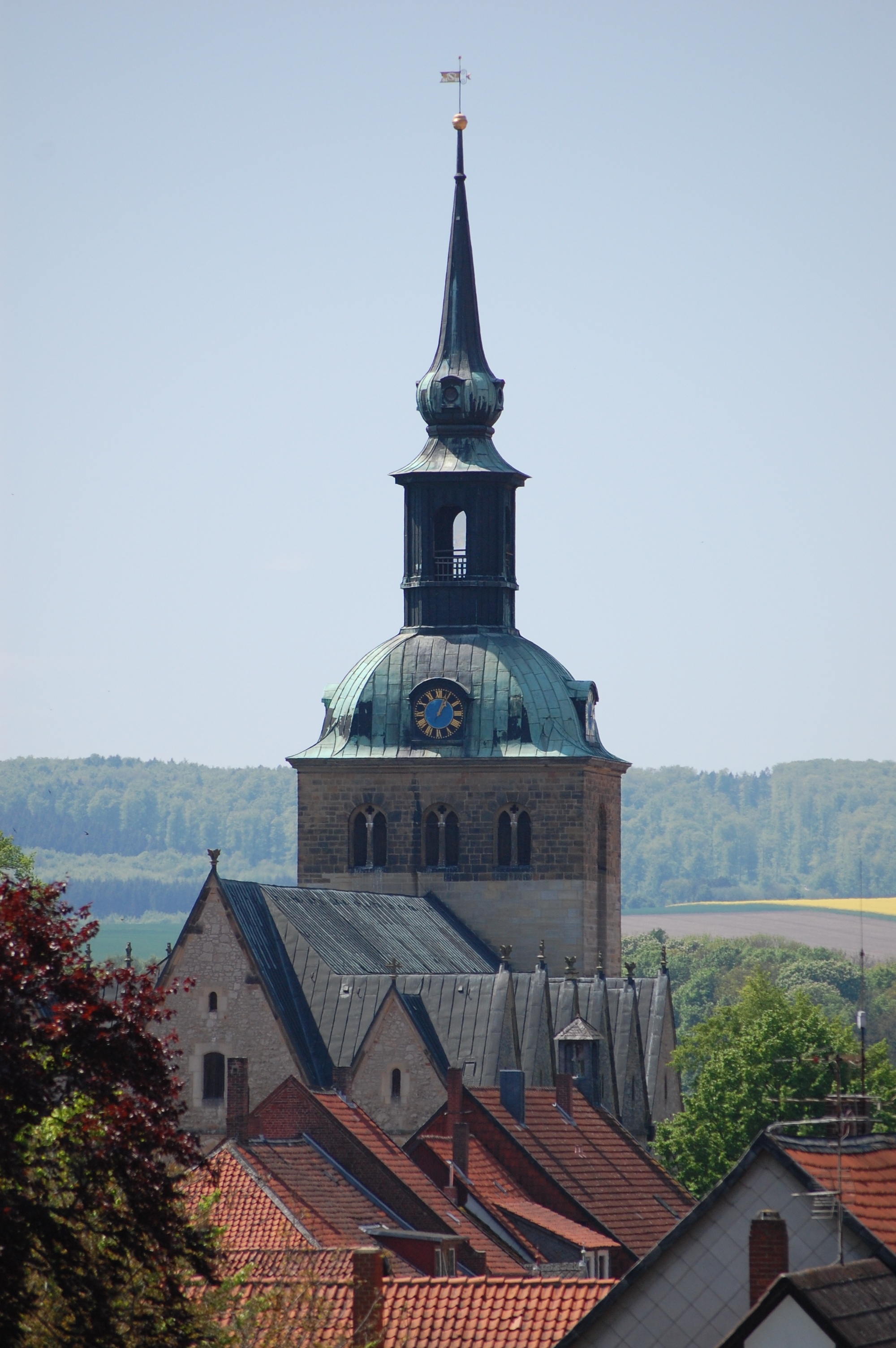
- Church of St. Pancratius in Bockenem.

- Coat of arms

- Location of Bockenem within Hildesheim district
- Interactive map of Bockenem
- Location within Germany Location within Lower Saxony
- Coordinates: 52°00′42″N 10°07′55″E
- Country: Germany
- State: Lower Saxony
- District: Hildesheim

Government
  - Mayor (2021–26): Rainer Block (Ind.)

Area
  - Total: 109.96 km^{2} (42.46 sq mi)
- Elevation: 110 m (360 ft)

Population (2025-12-31)
  - Total: 9,362
  - Density: 85.14/km^{2} (220.5/sq mi)
- Time zone: UTC+01:00 (CET)
  - Summer (DST): UTC+02:00 (CEST)
- Postal codes: 31167
- Dialling codes: 05067
- Vehicle registration: HI
- Website: www.bockenem.de

Bockenem (German pronunciation: [ˈboːkənəm]; Eastphalian: Bokeln) is a town in the district of Hildesheim, Lower Saxony, Germany that was founded in 1154. It is located on the German Timber-Frame Road.

== Surrounding villages ==
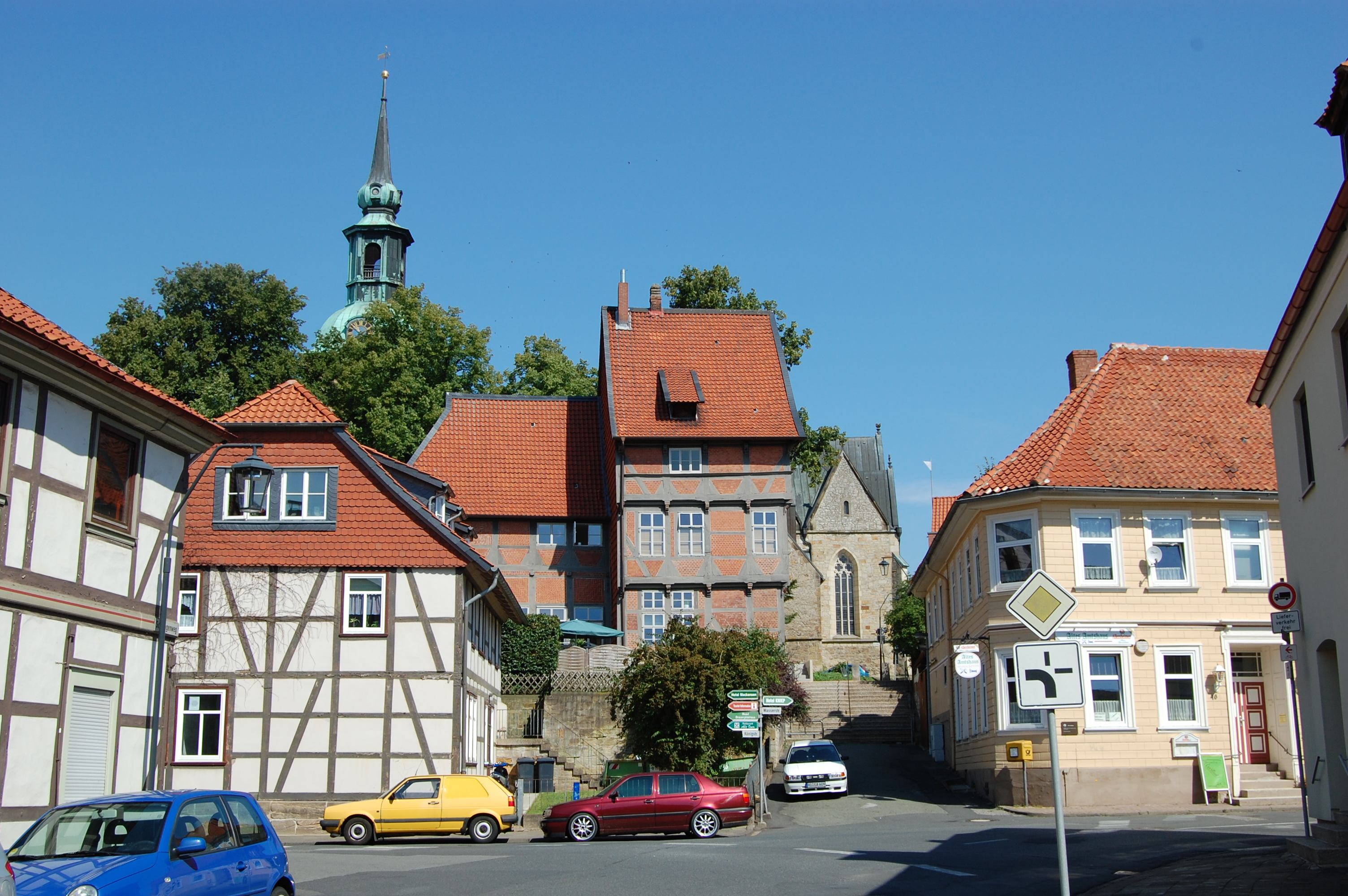

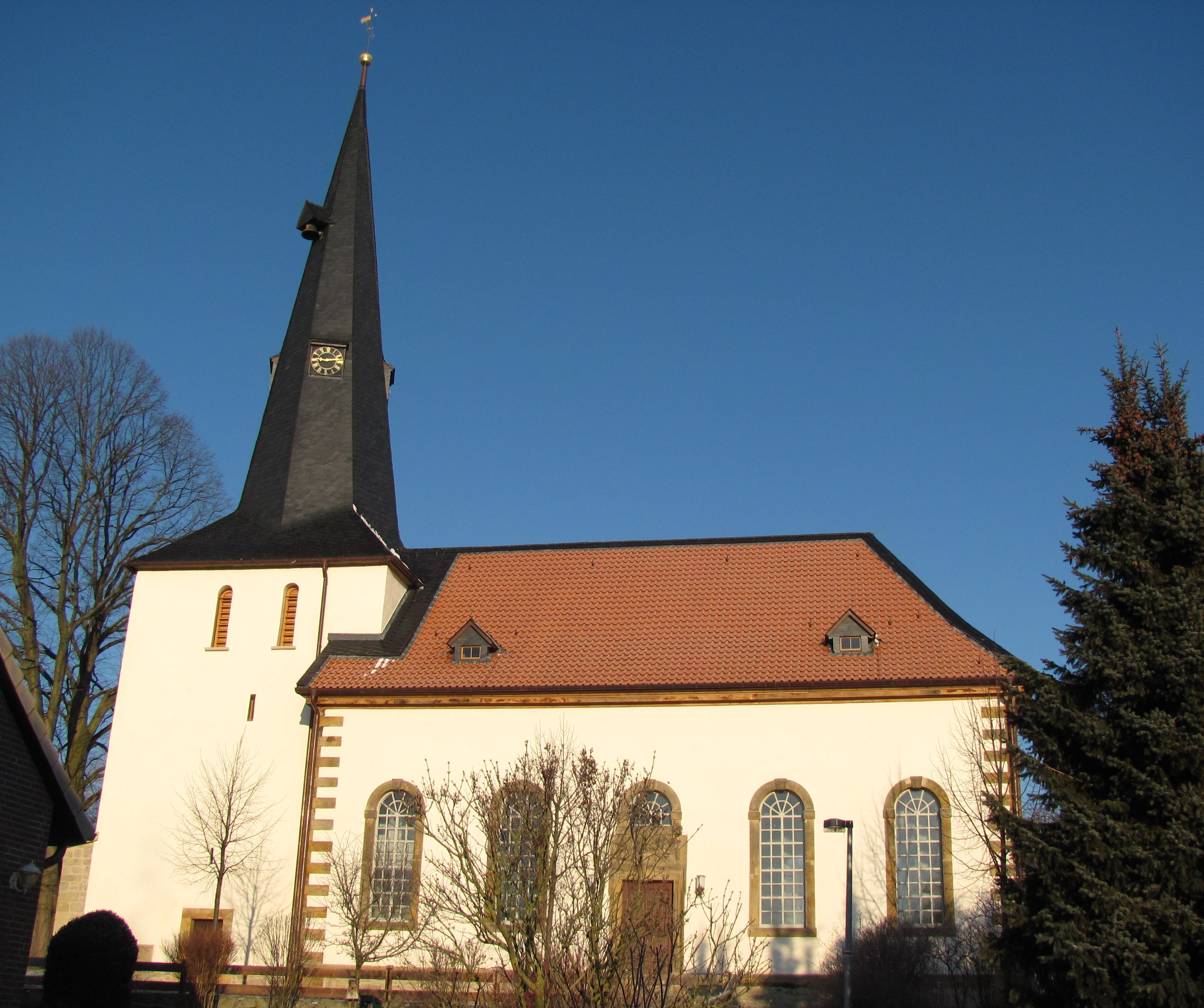
Protestant Church in Nette

- Jerze
- Königsdahlum
- Bornum
- Mahlum
- Schlewecke
- Ortshausen
- Volkersheim
- Hary
- Störy
- Bönnien
- Werder
- Nette
- Upstedt
- Bültum
- Groß Ilde
- Klein Ilde
- Wohlenhausen

== Sights ==
- The village of Störy was famous for having the largest museum of small cars in the world. The museum, however, was closed around 2005.
- The nave of the Protestant Church in Bockenem was built in 1403, its baptismal font dates from 1703.
- Another interesting church can be visited in the village of Nette. The romanesque tower has firing slits and may have been used as a fortification in times of war. The nave dates from 1731. Close to the church, several well-preserved half-timbered houses can be seen.
- One of the oldest trees in Germany can be seen in the middle of Upstedt, a village which became a part of Bockenem im 1974. It is a lime tree which was planted around 1000. The memorial opposite the lime tree refers to the first mention of Upstedt in a document written in 850 AD. The Protestant Church of Upstedt is an aisleless church with a baroque altar dating from 1757. The church with its ridge turret and a gable roof was renovated and enlarged from 1701-1704.

== Local council (Stadtrat) ==
Local council, elections September 2016
Party/List	CDU	SPD	UWG	Alliance 90/The Greens	Independents	Total
Seats	11	9	2	1	1	24
Vote share	45.2%	36.1%	9.5%	4.4%	3.7%	100%

== International relations ==
Bockenem is twinned with:

- Güntersberge, Germany
- Zawadzkie, Poland
- Thornbury, United Kingdom.

Meteor Gummiwerke is also located in Bockenem. Meteor is an automotive sealing company that supplies seals worldwide. Meteor is the largest factory in Bockenem employing over 1500 people.

== Personalities ==
- Karl-Heinz Bädje, (1917–1998), honorary citizen of the city in 1991 and founder of the company Meteor.
- Henriette Schrader-Breymann, (1827–1899), pioneer of the kindergarten system in Germany and early women's rights activist.
- Friedrich Buchholz, Mayor of the town of Bockenem from 1827 to 1865, also worked there as a lawyer. (1802–1865) The centrally located Buchholzmarkt was named after him
- Ernst Deger (1809–1885), significant church painter, especially in the Rhineland
- Johann Schwartzkopff, (1596–1658), lawyer at the University of Helmstedt and from 1646 Chancellor in the Duchy of Braunschweig
- Johann Friedrich Weule, (1811–1897), founder of the tower watch company J. F. Weule
