= Kielcza =

- Village
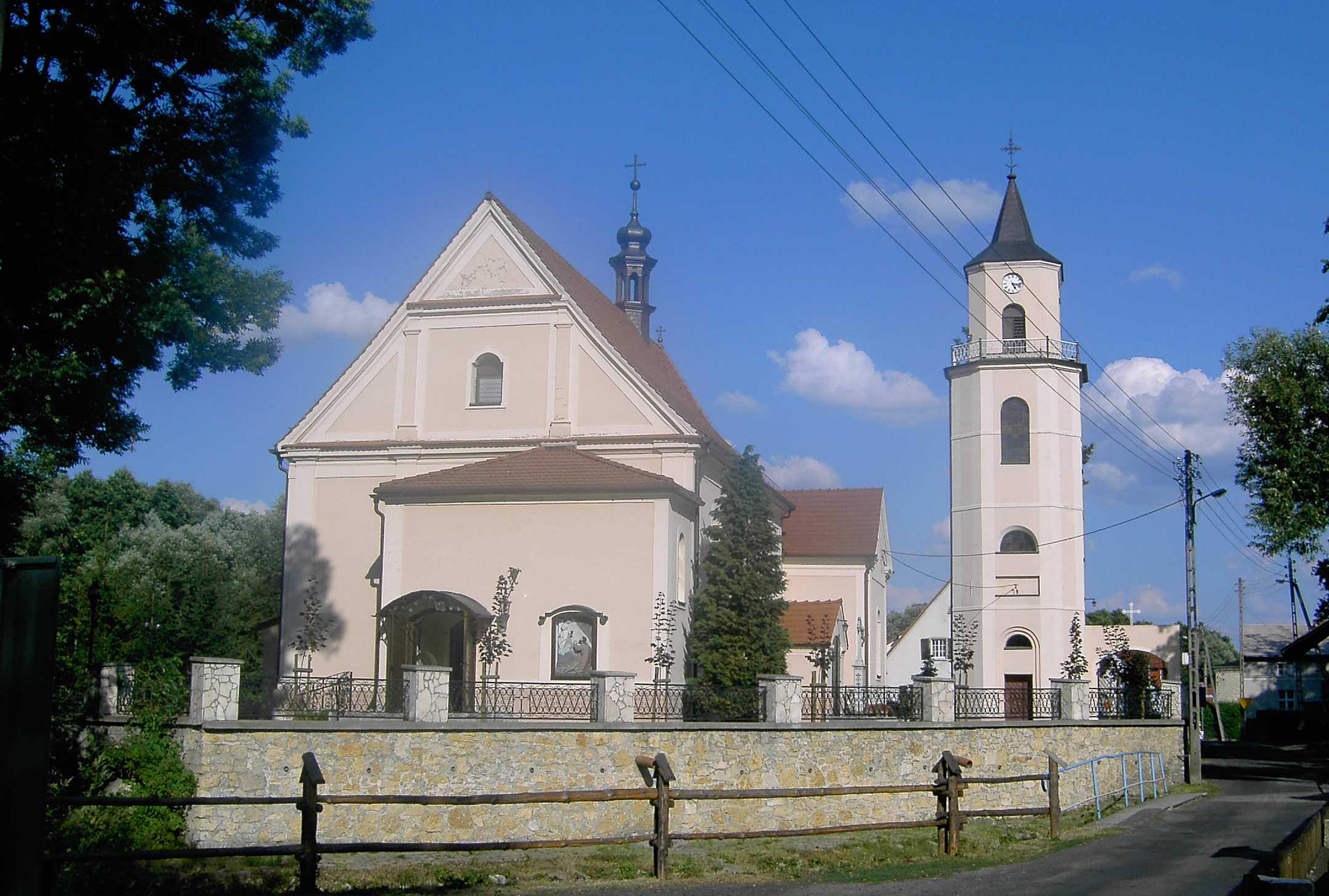
- Saint Bartholomew Church

- Location within Poland
- Coordinates: 50°34′N 18°32′E
- Country: Poland
- Voivodeship: Opole
- County: Strzelce
- Gmina: Zawadzkie
- Elevation: 220 m (720 ft)

Population
  - Total: 2,000
- Time zone: UTC+1 (CET)
  - Summer (DST): UTC+2 (CEST)
- Vehicle registration: OST
- Website: http://www.kielcza.opole.opoka.org.pl/

Kielcza [ˈkʲɛlt͡ʂa] (German: Keltsch or Keilerswalde) is a village in the administrative district of Gmina Zawadzkie, within Strzelce County, Opole Voivodeship, Upper Silesia in southern Poland.

The village has a population of 2,000.

== History ==
The village already existed in the 13th century. The village is believed to be the birthplace of Vincent of Kielcza, Polish canon, writer, poet, author of medieval Polish hymn Gaude Mater Polonia. At the beginning of the 14th century, it was mentioned as a church village in the Toszek archdeaconry. In the 1810s, a farmstead was established adjacent to the village.

== Main sights ==
Three objects in Kielcza are considered monuments by National Heritage Board of Poland:

- Saint Bartholomew Church dating back to 1779
- Mass grave of Silesian Uprisings Polish separatist fighters
- Wooden house dating back to 1831
