= Lambert III (bishop of Kraków) =

Bishop of Kraków

Lambert III was a Bishop of Kraków from 1082 to 1100 AD.

He was a German, from the Meuse River in the Archdiocese of Cologne and was appointed Bishop of Kraków, three years after the death of Stanisław ze Szczepanowa.

He was later one of the closest associates of Prince Władysław Herman, who generously endowed his Episcopal charities. Lambert conducted the reorganization chapter of Kraków, and in 1088 he translated the relics of his predecessor St. Stanislaus to the Cathedral on the Wawel Hill.
