= Stanislaus of Szczepanów =

11th-century Polish Catholic bishop

Saint Stanislaus of Szczepanów
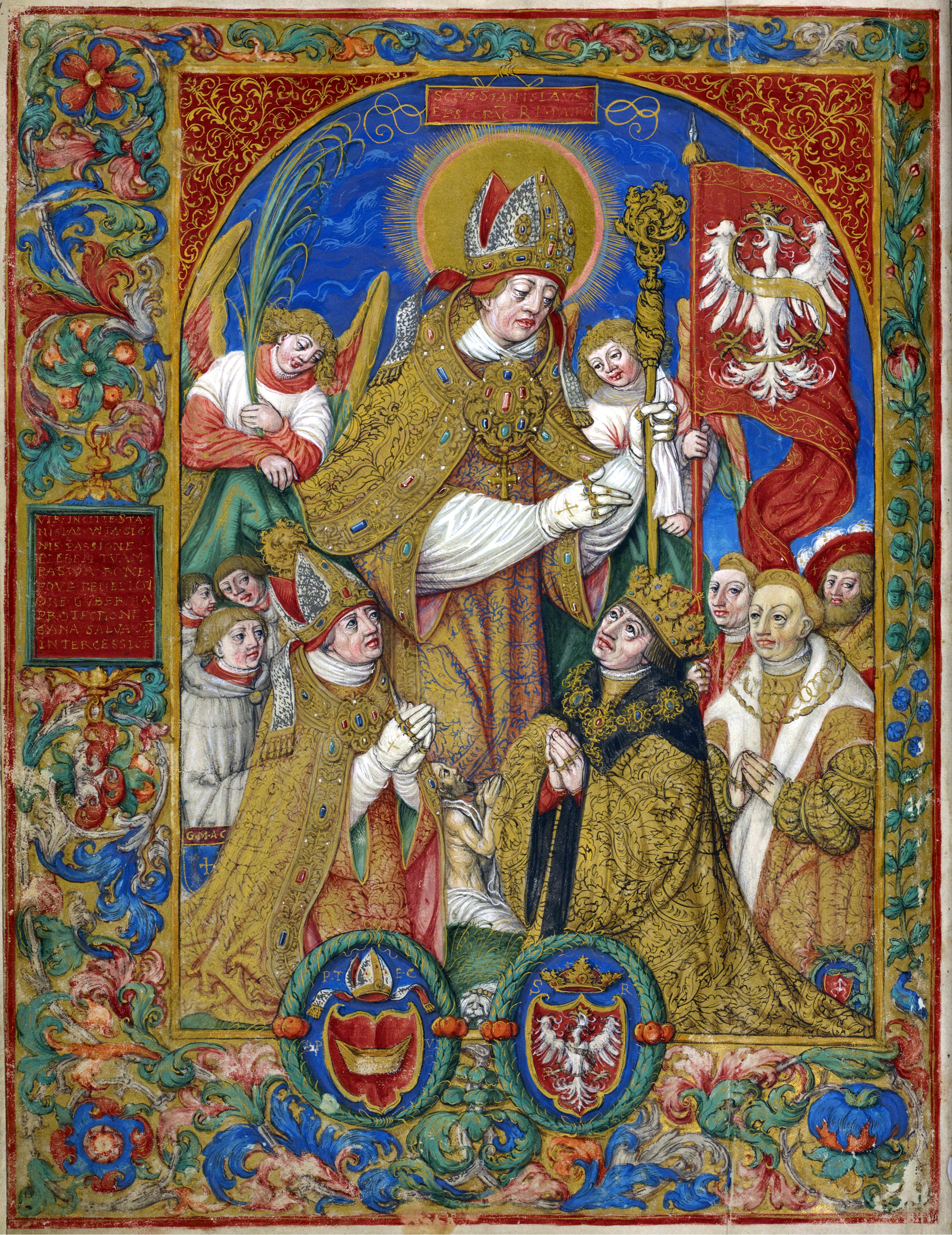
- Saint Stanislaus. 16th-century illustration from the Catalogus Archiepiscoporum Gnesnensium.

Bishop and Martyr
- Born: 26 July 1030; Szczepanów, Kingdom of Poland
- Died: 11 April 1079 (aged 48); Kraków, Kingdom of Poland
- Venerated in: Catholic Church
- Canonized: 17 September 1253, Assisi, Italy by Pope Innocent IV
- Major shrine: Wawel Cathedral
- Feast: 11 April; 7 May (General Roman Calendar of 1960); 8 May (in Poland)
- Attributes: Episcopal insignia, sword, resurrected Piotr
- Patronage: Poland, Kraków, moral order

Stanislaus of Szczepanów (Polish: Stanisław ze Szczepanowa; 26 July 1030 – 11 April 1079) was a Polish Catholic prelate who served as Bishop of Kraków and was martyred by the Polish King Bolesław II the Bold. He is the patron saint of Poland.

Stanislaus is venerated in the Catholic Church as Stanislaus the Martyr (as distinct from the 16th-century Jesuit, Stanislaus Kostka).

== Life ==
According to hagiographic tradition, Stanislaus, or Stanisław in Polish, was born at Szczepanów, a village in Lesser Poland, the only son of the noble and pious Wielisław and Bogna. He was educated at a cathedral school in Gniezno (then the capital of Poland) and later, probably at Paris. On his return to Poland, Stanislaus was ordained a priest by Lambert II Suła, Bishop of Kraków. Following his ordination, he was given a canonry in Kraków and became known for his preaching. He was subsequently made pastor of Czembocz near Kraków, canon and preacher at the cathedral, and later, vicar-general.

After the bishop's death (1072), Stanislaus was elected his successor but accepted the office only at the explicit command of Pope Alexander II. Stanislaus was one of the earliest native Polish bishops. He also became a ducal advisor and had some influence on Polish politics. Stanislaus' major accomplishments included bringing papal legates to Poland, and reestablishment of a metropolitan see in Gniezno. The latter was a precondition for Duke Bolesław's coronation as king, which took place in 1076. Stanislaus then encouraged King Bolesław to establish Benedictine monasteries to aid in the Christianization of Poland.

== Legend ==
Stanislaus' initial conflict with King Bolesław was a land dispute. Stanislaus had purchased for the diocese a piece of land on the banks of the Vistula River near Lublin from a certain Peter (Piotr), but after Piotr's death the land had been claimed by his family. The King ruled for the claimants; but, according to legend, Stanislaus resurrected Piotr so that he could confirm that he had sold the land to the bishop.

According to Augustin Calmet, an 18th-century Bible scholar, Stanislaus asked the King for three days to produce his witness, Piotr. The King and the court were said to have laughed at the absurd request, but the King granted Stanislaus the three days. Stanislaus spent them in ceaseless prayer and, dressed in full bishop's regalia, went with a procession to the cemetery where Piotr had been buried three years earlier. He had Piotr's grave dug up until his remains were discovered. Then, before a multitude of witnesses, Stanislaus told Piotr to rise, and Piotr did so.

Piotr was then dressed in a cloak and brought before King Bolesław to testify on Stanislaus' behalf. The dumbfounded court heard Piotr reprimand his three sons and testify that Stanislaus had indeed paid for the land. Unable to give any other verdict, the King dismissed the suit against the bishop. Stanislaus asked Piotr whether he would remain alive, but Piotr declined and so was laid to rest once more in his grave and was reburied.

== Chastisement of Bolesław ==
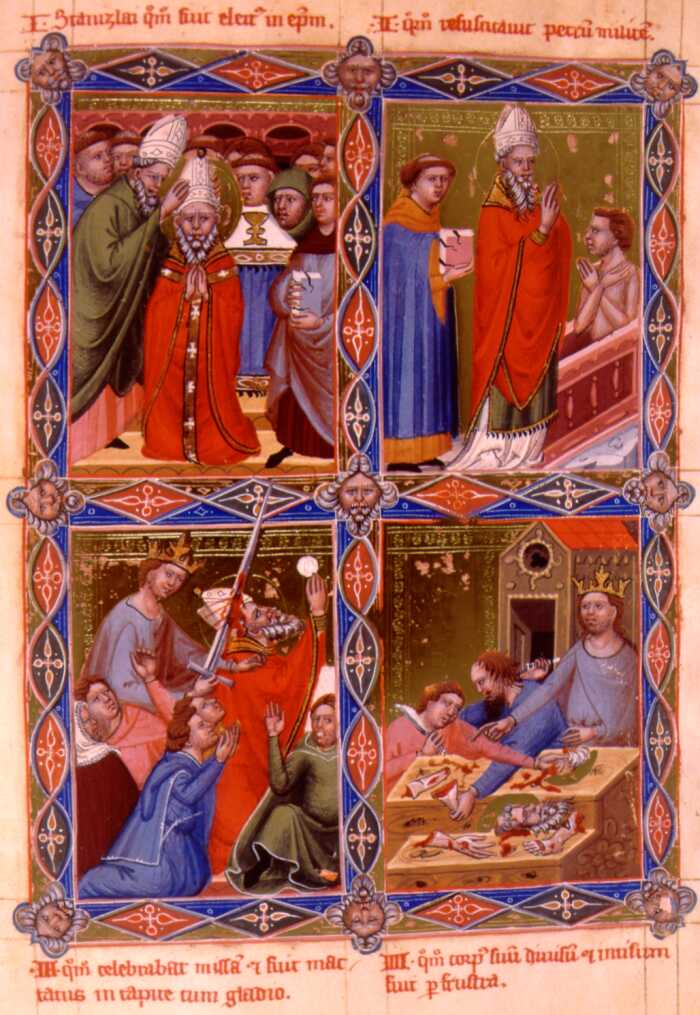
1- Saint Stanislaus being ordained as bishop. 2- Saint Stanislaus resurrects Peter. 3-King Bolesław murders Saint Stanislaus. 4-Stanislaus' body is cut into pieces. Image from the Hungarian Kings' Anjou Legendarium of the 14th century.

A more substantial conflict with King Bolesław arose after a prolonged war in Ruthenia, when weary warriors deserted and went home, alarmed at tidings that their overseers were taking over their estates and wives. According to Wincenty Kadłubek, the King punished the soldiers' faithless wives very cruelly and was criticized for it by Bishop Stanislaus. Jan Długosz, however, writes that the bishop had in fact criticized the King for his own sexual immorality. Gallus Anonymus, in his laconic account, only condemned both the "traitor bishop" and the violent king.

Whatever the actual cause of the conflict between them, the result was that the bishop excommunicated King Bolesław, which included forbidding the saying of the Divine Office by the canons of Kraków Cathedral in case Bolesław attended. The excommunication aided the King's political opponents, and the King accused Bishop Stanislaus of treason and the royal court found him guilty.

== Martyrdom ==
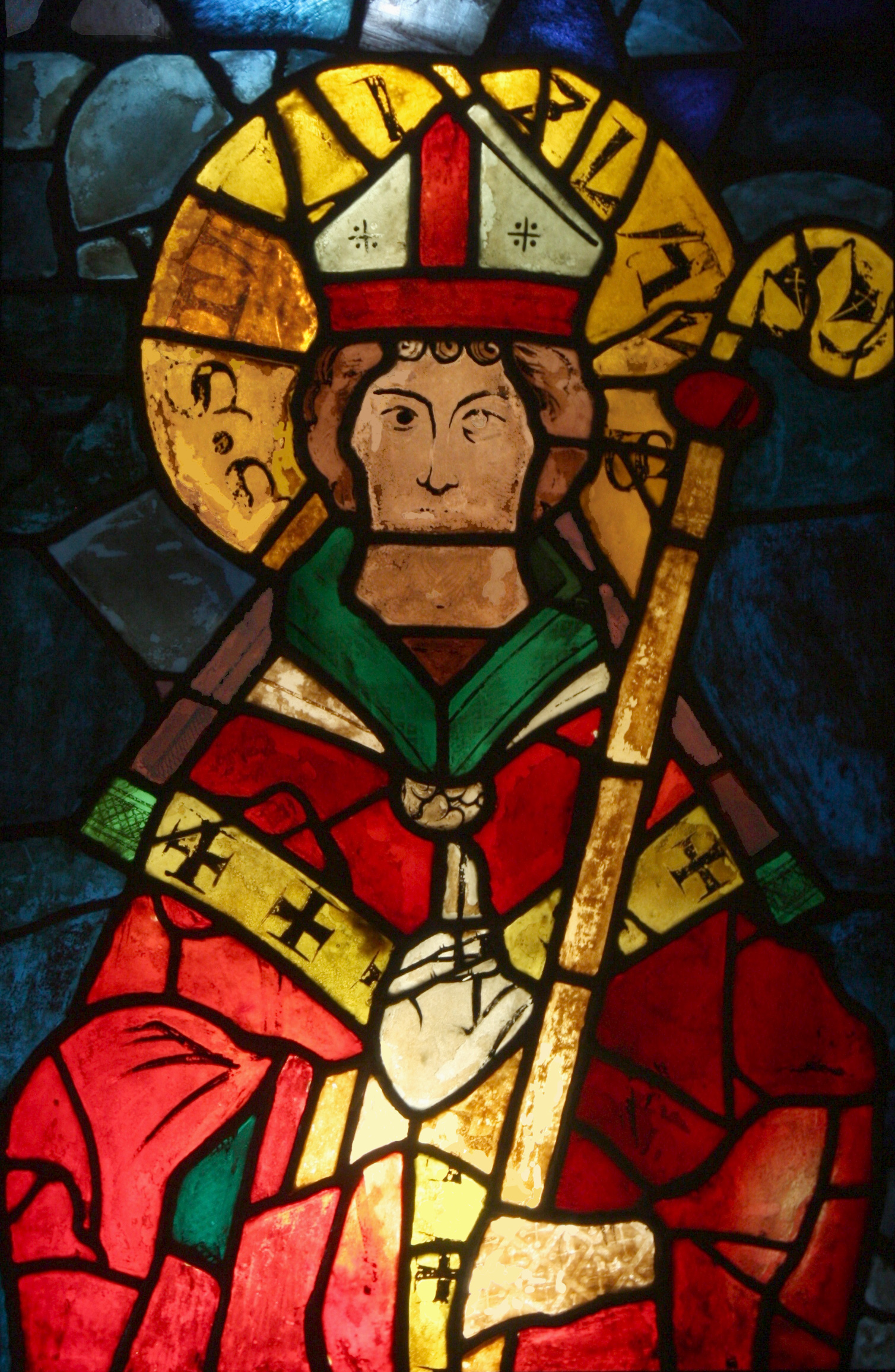
13th-century effigy of Saint Stanislaus

King Bolesław sent his men to execute Bishop Stanislaus but when they didn't dare touch the bishop, the King decided to kill the bishop himself. He is said to have slain Stanislaus while he was celebrating Mass in the Skałka outside the walls of Kraków. According to Paweł Jasienica: Polska Piastów, it was actually in the Wawel Castle. The guards then cut the bishop's body into pieces and scattered them to be devoured by wild beasts. According to the legend, his members miraculously reintegrated while the pool was guarded by four eagles.

The exact date of Stanislaus's death is uncertain. According to different sources, it was either 11 April or 8 May 1079.

The murder stirred outrage throughout the land and led to the dethronement of King Bolesław II the Generous, who had to seek refuge in Hungary, and was succeeded by his brother, Władysław I Herman.

Whether Stanislaus should be regarded as a traitor or a hero remains one of the classic unresolved questions of Polish history. His story has a parallel in the murder of Thomas Becket in 1170 by henchmen of England's King Henry II.

== Original sources ==
There is little information about Stanislaus's life. The only near-contemporary source was a chronicle of Gallus Anonymus, but the author evaded writing details about a conflict with the king. Later sources are the chronicles of Wincenty Kadłubek, and two hagiographies by Wincenty of Kielcza. All contain hagiographic matter.

== Veneration as a saint ==
The cult of Saint Stanislaus the Martyr began immediately upon his death. In 1245 his relics were translated (i.e., moved) to Kraków's Wawel Cathedral. In the early 13th century, Bishop Iwo Odrowąż initiated preparations for Stanislaus' canonization and ordered Wincenty of Kielce to write the martyr's vita. Stanislaus of Kraków was canonized by Pope Innocent IV at Assisi in 1253.

Pope Pius V did not include the saint's feast day in the Tridentine calendar for use throughout the Roman Catholic Church. Subsequently, Pope Clement VIII inserted it, setting it for 7 May, but Kraków observes it on 8 May, a supposed date of the saint's death, having done so since 8 May 1254, when it was attended by many Polish bishops and princes. In 1969, the Church moved the feast to 11 April, considered to be the date of his death in 1079.

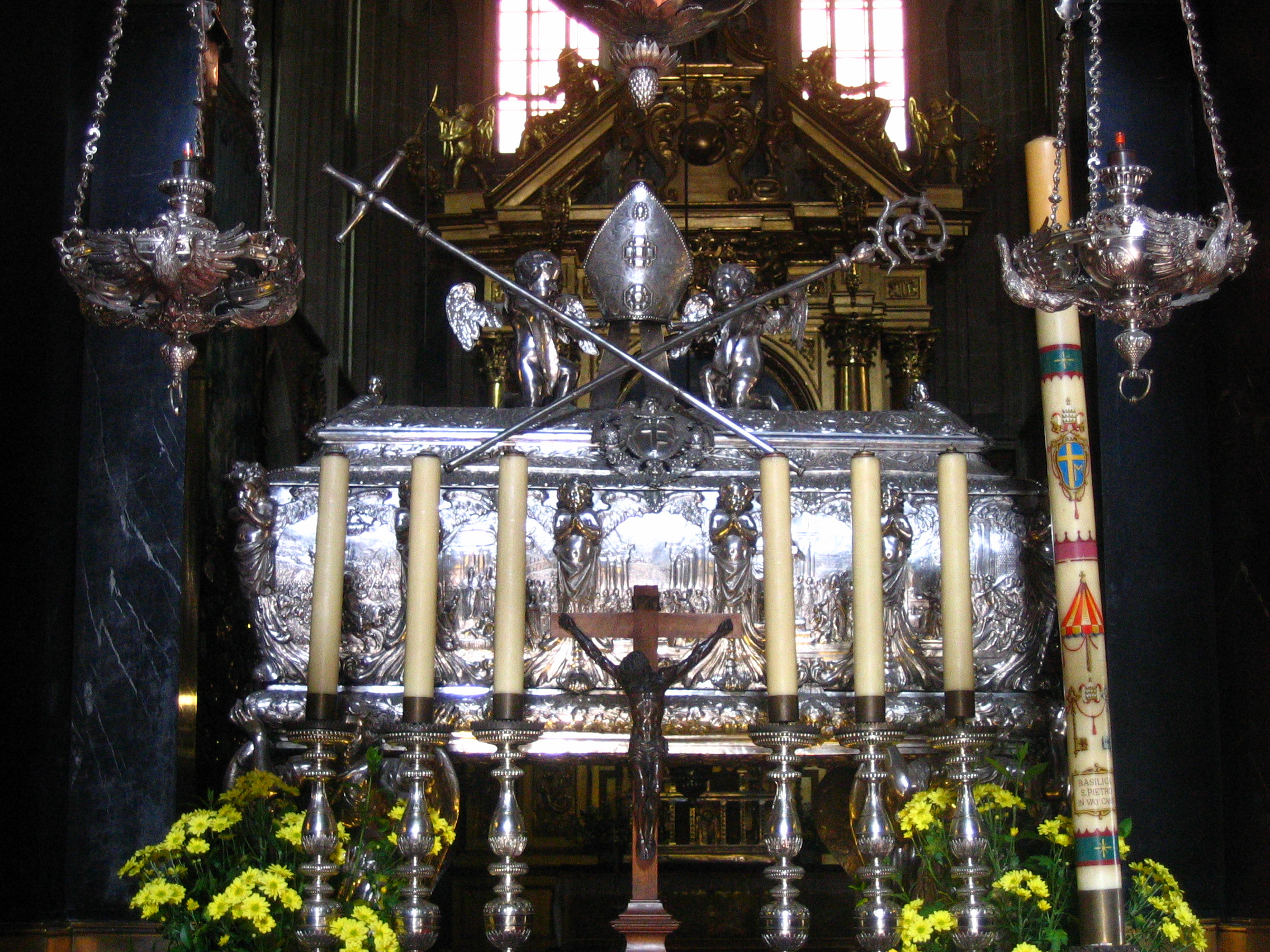
Silver sarcophagus of St. Stanislaus in the Wawel Cathedral

As the first native Polish saint, Stanislaus is the patron of Poland and Kraków, and of some Polish dioceses. He shares the patronage of Poland with Saint Adalbert of Prague, Florian, and Our Lady the Queen of Poland.

Wawel Cathedral, which holds the saint's relics, became a principal national shrine. Almost all of the Polish kings from Władysław I the Elbow-high were crowned while they knelt before his sarcophagus, which stands in the middle of the cathedral. In the 17th century, King Władysław IV Vasa commissioned an ornate silver coffin to hold the saint's relics. It was destroyed by Swedish troops during the Deluge but was replaced with a new one c. 1670.

Saint Stanislaus' veneration has had great patriotic importance. In the period of Poland's feudal fragmentation, it was believed that Poland would one day reintegrate as had the members of his body. Half a millennium after Poland had indeed reintegrated, while yet another dismemberment of the polity was underway in the Partitions of the Polish–Lithuanian Commonwealth, the framers of the Polish Constitution of 3 May 1791, would dedicate this progressive political document to Saint Stanislaus, whose feast day fell close to the date of the Constitution's adoption.

Each year on the first Sunday after 8 May, a procession, led by the Bishop of Kraków, goes out from Wawel to the Church on the Rock. The procession, once a local event, was popularized in the 20th century by Polish Primate Stefan Wyszyński and Archbishop of Kraków, Karol Wojtyła. Wojtyla, as Pope John Paul II, called Saint Stanislaus the patron saint of moral order and wanted his first papal return to Poland to occur in April 1979 in observance of the 900th anniversary to the day of his martyrdom, but the Communist rulers of that time blocked this, causing the visit to be delayed until June of that year.

Roman Catholic churches belonging to Polish communities outside Poland are often dedicated to Saint Stanislaus.

In iconography, Saint Stanislaus is usually depicted as a bishop holding a sword, the instrument of his martyrdom, and sometimes with Piotr rising from the dead at his feet.

== Feast Day ==
- 25 January – commemoration of translation of relics to Church of Saint Roch,
- 11 April – commemoration of death anniversary,
- 7 May – commemoration by (Traditional Roman Catholics),
- 8 May – main commemoration in Poland,
- 27 September – commemoration of translation of relics from Skałka to Wawel,
- 6 October – commemoration of translation of relics to Esztergom

== See also ==
- Gaude Mater Polonia
- Archbishop of Kraków
- Order of Saint Stanislaus
- Saint Stanislaus of Szczepanów, patron saint archive

Catholic Church titles
Preceded by Lambert Suła	Bishop of Kraków; 1072–1079	Succeeded by Lambert III (bishop of Kraków)
