= Wincenty of Kielcza =

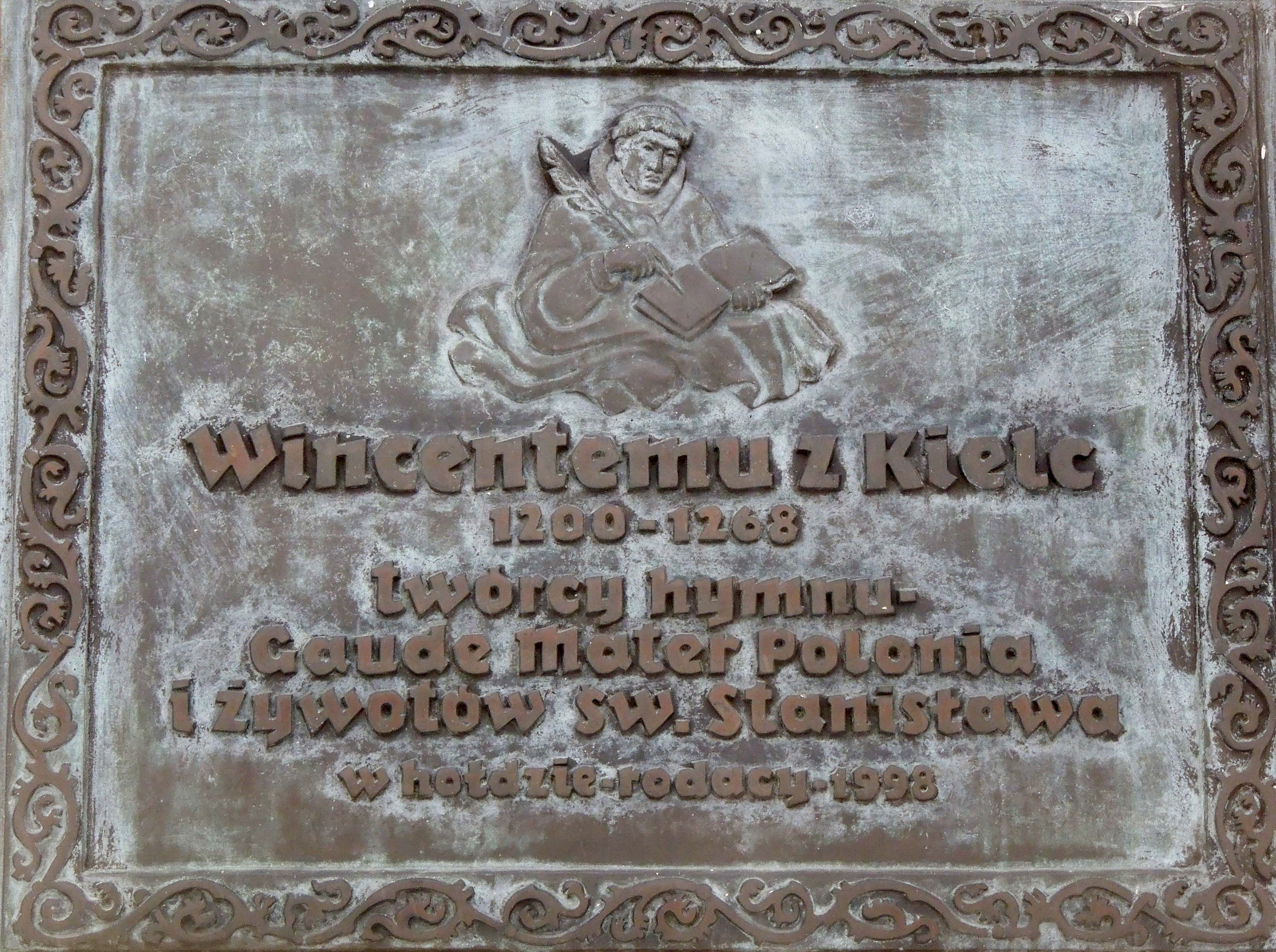
Wincenty of Kielcza

Wincenty of Kielcza (c. 1200 – after 1262) was a Polish canon, poet, and composer, working in Kraków and writing in Latin. He was a member of the Dominican Order.

Most likely born in the village of Kielcza (however some historians believe that he was born in Kielce), he is best known for his hymn "Gaude Mater Polonia". Wincenty also wrote a shorter and a longer life of Saint Stanislaus of Szczepanów for his canonization.
