= Zawadzkie =

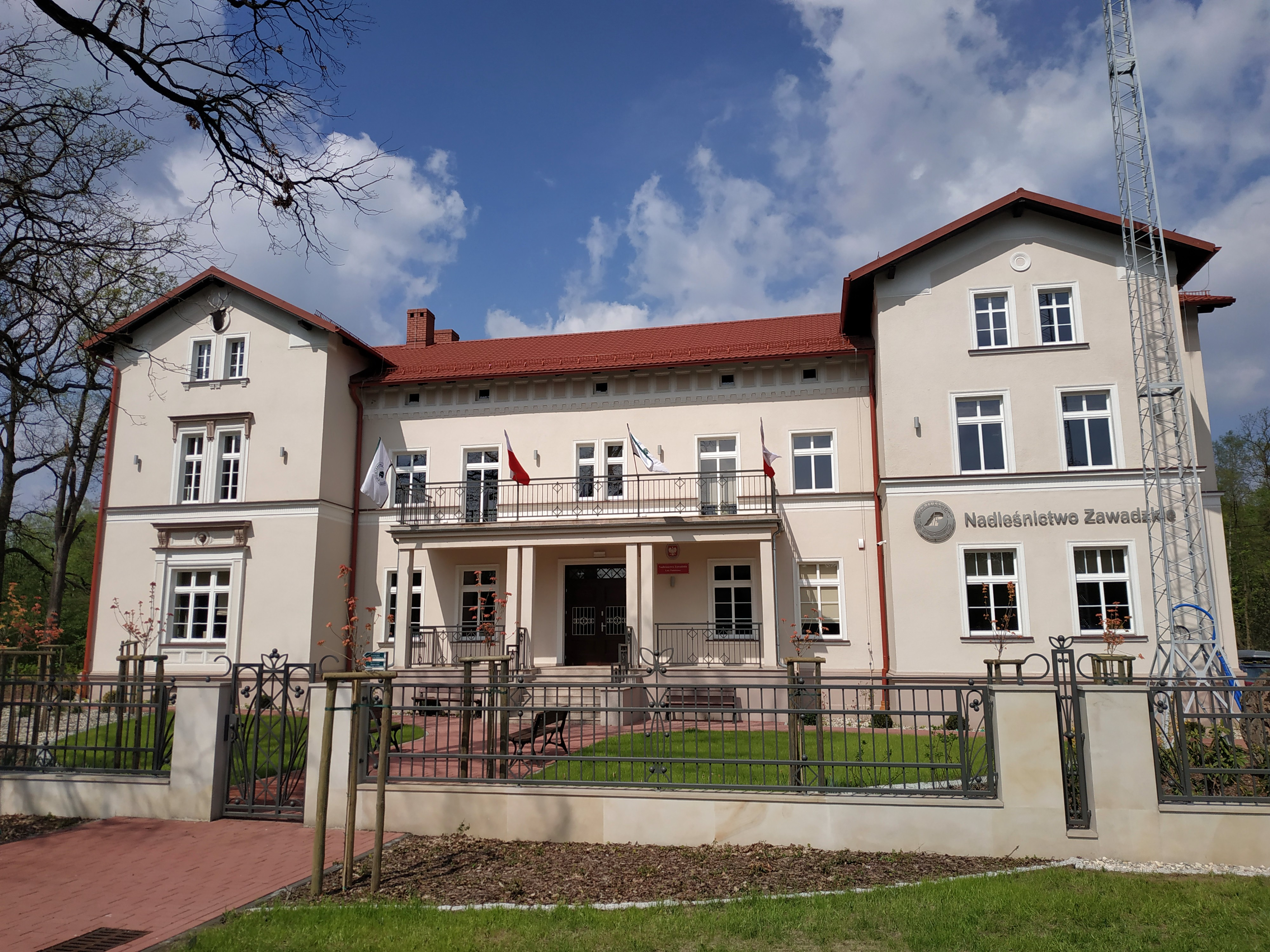
- Forestry in Zawadzkie

- Flag Coat of arms

- Location within Poland
- Coordinates: 50°36′34″N 18°28′48″E
- Country: Poland
- Voivodeship: Opole
- County: Strzelce
- Gmina: Zawadzkie

Area
  - Total: 16.52 km^{2} (6.38 sq mi)

Population (2019-06-30)
  - Total: 7,135
  - Density: 431.9/km^{2} (1,119/sq mi)
- Time zone: UTC+1 (CET)
  - Summer (DST): UTC+2 (CEST)
- Postal code: 47-120
- Vehicle registration: OST
- Website: http://www.zawadzkie.pl

Zawadzkie [zaˈvat͡skʲɛ] (German: Zawadzki, 1936–1945 Andreashütte; Silesian: Zawadzke) is a town in Strzelce County, Opole Voivodeship, in southern Poland, with 7,135 inhabitants (2019).

== Twin towns – sister cities ==
See twin towns of Gmina Zawadzkie.
