= Żędowice =

- Village
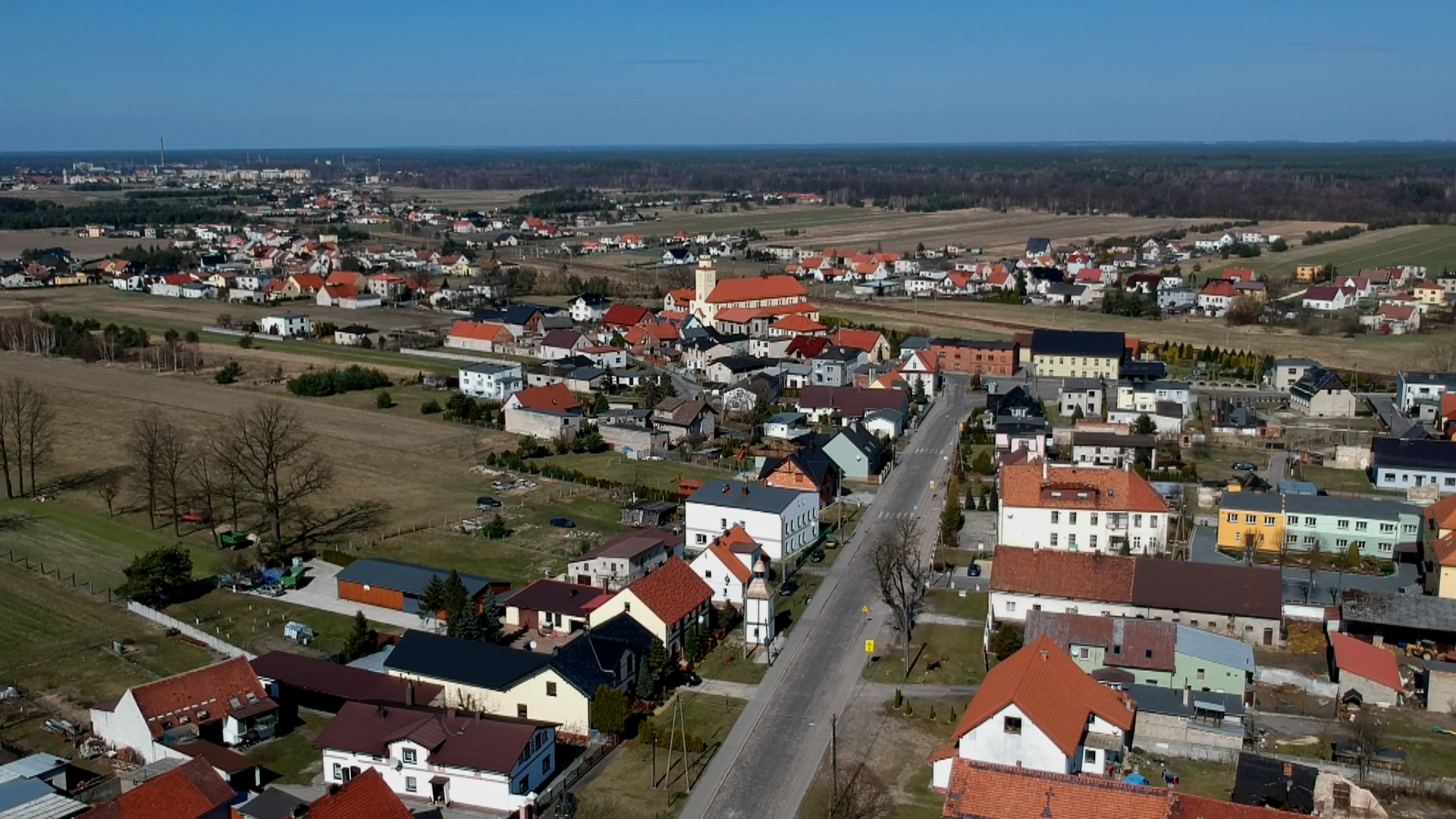
- Aerial view of Żędowice

- Location within Poland
- Coordinates: 50°34′N 18°30′E
- Country: Poland
- Voivodeship: Opole
- County: Strzelce
- Gmina: Zawadzkie
- Population: 2,500
- Time zone: UTC+1 (CET)
  - Summer (DST): UTC+2 (CEST)
- Vehicle registration: OST
- Website: www.zedowice republika.pl

Żędowice [ʐɛndɔˈvit͡sɛ] (German: Sandowitz) is a village in the administrative district of Gmina Zawadzkie, within Strzelce County, Opole Voivodeship, in southern Poland.

== History ==
In the 10th century the area became part of the emerging Polish state, and later on, it was part of Poland, Bohemia and then Prussia. During World War II, the German administration operated the E575 forced labour subcamp of the Stalag VIII-B/344 prisoner-of-war camp in the village. After Germany's defeat in the war, in 1945, the village became again part of Poland.

== Transport ==
There used to be a train station in Żędowice, and the Voivodeship road 901 passes through the village.
