= Ruda =

Ruda may refer to:

== Islands ==
- Ruda (island), Croatian island in the Elaphiti Archipelago

== Rivers ==
- Ruda (river), a river in Croatia, tributary of the Cetina river
- Ruda (Narew), a river in Poland, tributary of the Narew
- Ruda (Oder), a river in Poland, tributary of the Oder
- Ruda, a river in Romania, tributary of the Râul Târgului
- Ruda (Suceava), a river in Romania, tributary of the Suceava river
- Ruda, a river in Romania, tributary of the Luncoiu
- Ruda (Teteriv), a river in Ukraine, tributary of the Teteriv

== Settlements ==
=== Bosnia and Herzegovina ===
- Ruda, Novi Travnik, a village in Novi Travnik

=== Croatia ===
- Ruda, Croatia, a village near Otok, Split-Dalmatia County

=== Czech Republic ===
- Ruda (Rakovník District), a municipality and village in the Central Bohemian Region
- Ruda (Žďár nad Sázavou District), a municipality and village in the Vysočina Region
- Ruda nad Moravou, a municipality and village in the Olomouc Region
- Ruda, a village and part of Krouna in the Pardubice Region
- Ruda, a village and part of Tvrdkov in the Moravian-Silesian Region

=== Italy ===
- Ruda, Italy, a municipality

=== Poland ===
- Ruda Śląska, a town in southern Poland
- Ruda, Gidle, a village in Łódź Voivodeship (central Poland)
- Ruda, Grudziądz County in Kuyavian-Pomeranian Voivodeship (north-central Poland)
- Ruda, Gmina Skrwilno in Kuyavian-Pomeranian Voivodeship (north-central Poland)
- Ruda, Włocławek County in Kuyavian-Pomeranian Voivodeship (north-central Poland)
- Ruda, Gmina Rogowo in Kuyavian-Pomeranian Voivodeship (north-central Poland)
- Ruda, Chełm County in Lublin Voivodeship (east Poland)
- Ruda, Janów County in Lublin Voivodeship (east Poland)
- Ruda, Białystok County in Podlaskie Voivodeship (north-east Poland)
- Ruda, Grajewo County in Podlaskie Voivodeship (north-east Poland)
- Ruda, Mońki County in Podlaskie Voivodeship (north-east Poland)
- Ruda, Łask County in Łódź Voivodeship (central Poland)
- Ruda, Gmina Dobryszyce in Łódź Voivodeship (central Poland)
- Ruda, Gmina Gidle in Łódź Voivodeship (central Poland)
- Ruda, Sieradz County in Łódź Voivodeship (central Poland)
- Ruda, Skierniewice County in Łódź Voivodeship (central Poland)
- Ruda, Wieluń County in Łódź Voivodeship (central Poland)
- Ruda, Gmina Krzywda in Lublin Voivodeship (east Poland)
- Ruda, Gmina Serokomla in Lublin Voivodeship (east Poland)
- Ruda, Gmina Stoczek Łukowski in Lublin Voivodeship (east Poland)
- Ruda, Busko County in Świętokrzyskie Voivodeship (south-central Poland)
- Ruda, Kielce County in Świętokrzyskie Voivodeship (south-central Poland)
- Ruda, Mielec County in Subcarpathian Voivodeship (south-east Poland)
- Ruda, Ropczyce-Sędziszów County in Subcarpathian Voivodeship (south-east Poland)
- Ruda, Starachowice County in Świętokrzyskie Voivodeship (south-central Poland)
- Ruda, Staszów County in Świętokrzyskie Voivodeship (south-central Poland)
- Ruda, Stalowa Wola County in Subcarpathian Voivodeship (south-east Poland)
- Ruda, Garwolin County in Masovian Voivodeship (east-central Poland)
- Ruda, Kozienice County in Masovian Voivodeship (east-central Poland)
- Ruda, Mińsk County in Masovian Voivodeship (east-central Poland)
- Ruda, Mława County in Masovian Voivodeship (east-central Poland)
- Ruda, Gmina Wąsewo, Ostrów County in Masovian Voivodeship (east-central Poland)
- Ruda, Piaseczno County in Masovian Voivodeship (east-central Poland)
- Ruda, Siedlce County in Masovian Voivodeship (east-central Poland)
- Ruda, Wołomin County in Masovian Voivodeship (east-central Poland)
- Ruda, Gmina Kazanów in Masovian Voivodeship (east-central Poland)
- Ruda, Gmina Przyłęk in Masovian Voivodeship (east-central Poland)
- Ruda, Żuromin County in Masovian Voivodeship (east-central Poland)
- Ruda, Krotoszyn County in Greater Poland Voivodeship (west-central Poland)
- Ruda, Oborniki County in Greater Poland Voivodeship (west-central Poland)
- Ruda, Piła County in Greater Poland Voivodeship (west-central Poland)
- Ruda, Pleszew County in Greater Poland Voivodeship (west-central Poland)
- Ruda, Turek County in Greater Poland Voivodeship (west-central Poland)
- Ruda, Silesian Voivodeship (south Poland)
- Ruda, Pomeranian Voivodeship (north Poland)
- Ruda, Giżycko County in Warmian-Masurian Voivodeship (north Poland)
- Ruda, Pisz County in Warmian-Masurian Voivodeship (north Poland)

=== Romania ===
- Ruda, a village in Ghelari Commune, Hunedoara County
- Ruda, a village in Budeşti Commune, Vâlcea County
- Ruda, the Hungarian name for Ruda-Brad village, Brad city, Hunedoara County

=== Serbia ===
- Ruđa, a village in the municipality of Tutin

=== Sweden ===
- Ruda, Sweden, a locality

== Other uses ==
- Ruda (deity), worshipped among the North Arabian tribes of pre-Islamic Arabia
- Ruda (sheep), a breed of sheep from Albania
- Rudá [pt], god of love in Tupi religion and mythology
- A female rudo in lucha libre
