= Kotfin =

Kotfin can mean:

- Kotfin, Łódź Voivodeship
- Kotfin, Masovian Voivodeship
