= Górki-Kolonia, Łódź Voivodeship =

Górki-Kolonia
- Village
- Location within Poland
- Coordinates: 50°54′55″N 19°29′30″E
- Country: Poland
- Voivodeship: Łódź
- County: Radomsko
- Gmina: Gidle

Górki-Kolonia [ˈɡurki kɔˈlɔɲa] is a village in the administrative district of Gmina Gidle, within Radomsko County, Łódź Voivodeship, in central Poland.
