= Skrzypiec =

Skrzypiec may refer to the following places:

- Skrzypiec, Łódź Voivodeship (central Poland)
- Skrzypiec, Opole Voivodeship (south-west Poland)
- Skrzypiec, West Pomeranian Voivodeship (north-west Poland)
