= Gowarzów =

- Village
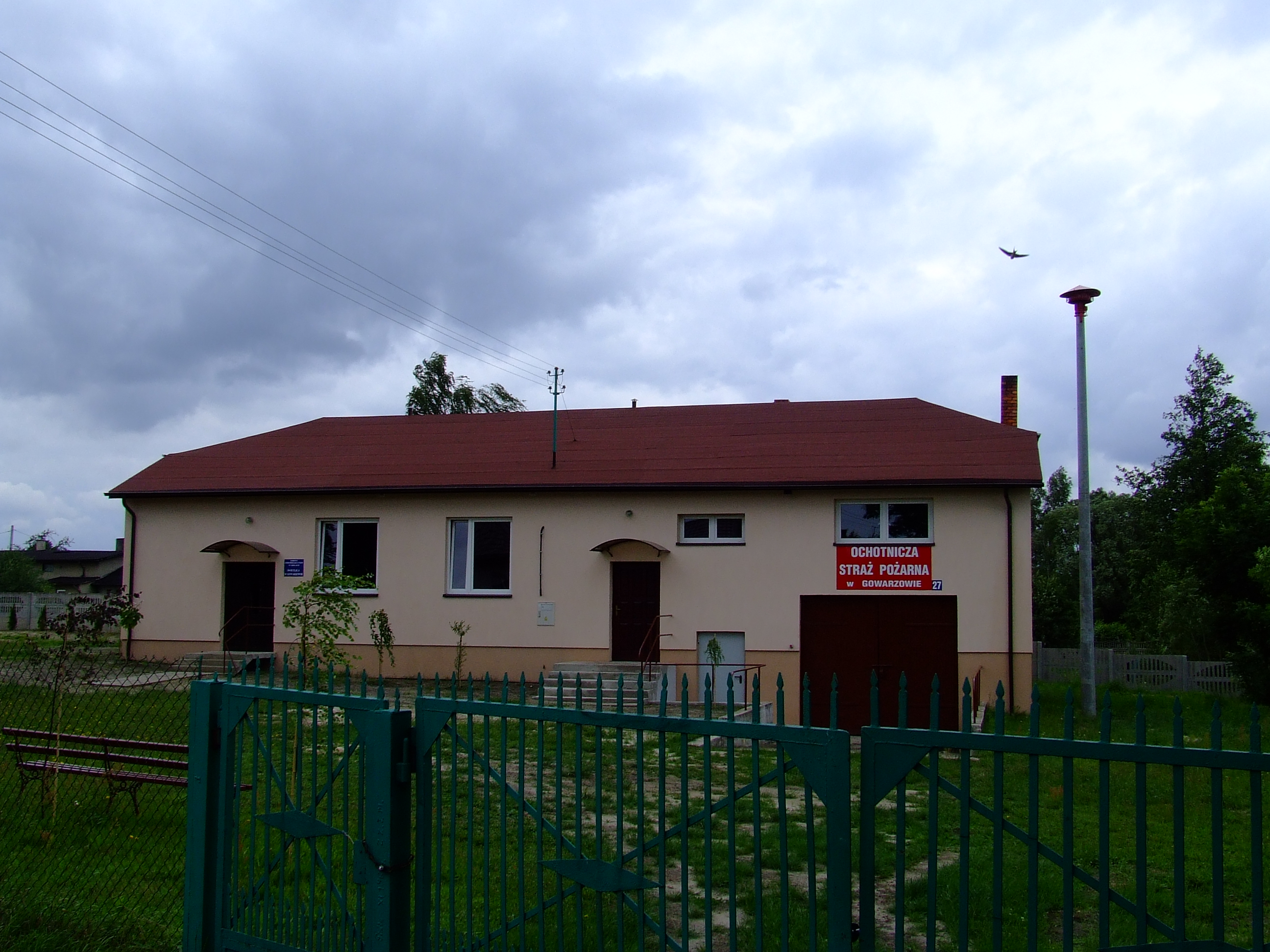

- Location within Poland
- Coordinates: 50°59′N 19°26′E
- Country: Poland
- Voivodeship: Łódź
- County: Radomsko
- Gmina: Gidle
- Population: 436

Gowarzów [ɡɔˈvaʐuf] is a village in the administrative district of Gmina Gidle, in Radomsko County, Łódź Voivodeship, in central Poland, approximately 5 km (3 mi) northwest of Gidle, 10 km (6 mi) south of Radomsko, and 89 km (55 mi) south of the regional capital Łódź.
