= Zabrodzie =

Zabrodzie may refer to the following places in Poland:

- Zabrodzie, Lower Silesian Voivodeship (south-west Poland)
- Zabrodzie, Podlaskie Voivodeship (north-east Poland)
- Zabrodzie, Łódź Voivodeship (central Poland)
- Zabrodzie, Lublin Voivodeship (east Poland)
- Zabrodzie, Świętokrzyskie Voivodeship (south-central Poland)
- Zabrodzie, Ostrołęka County in Masovian Voivodeship (east-central Poland)
- Zabrodzie, Wyszków County in Masovian Voivodeship (east-central Poland)
- Zabrodzie, Greater Poland Voivodeship (west-central Poland)
- Zabrodzie, Silesian Voivodeship (south Poland)
- Zabrodzie, Warmian-Masurian Voivodeship (north Poland)
- Zabrodzie, West Pomeranian Voivodeship (north-west Poland)
