= Stęszów =

Stęszów may refer to the following places in Poland:

- Stęszów, Lower Silesian Voivodeship (south-west Poland)
- Stęszów, Łódź Voivodeship (central Poland)
