= Graby =

Graby may refer to the following places:

- Graby, Greater Poland Voivodeship (west-central Poland)
- Graby, Łódź Voivodeship (central Poland)
- Graby, Świętokrzyskie Voivodeship (south-central Poland)
- Graby, Lincolnshire, shrunken village in the parish of Dowsby, Lincolnshire, England
