= Wojnowice =

Wojnowice may refer to:

- Wojnowice, Gmina Miękinia in Środa County, Lower Silesian Voivodeship (south-west Poland)
- Wojnowice, Wrocław County in Lower Silesian Voivodeship (south-west Poland)
- Wojnowice, Łódź Voivodeship (central Poland)
- Wojnowice, Opatów County in Świętokrzyskie Voivodeship (south-central Poland)
- Wojnowice, Ostrowiec County in Świętokrzyskie Voivodeship (south-central Poland)
- Wojnowice, Leszno County in Greater Poland Voivodeship (west-central Poland)
- Wojnowice, Nowy Tomyśl County in Greater Poland Voivodeship (west-central Poland)
- Wojnowice, Silesian Voivodeship (south Poland)
- Wojnowice, Opole Voivodeship (south-west Poland)
- Wojnowice, West Pomeranian Voivodeship (north-west Poland)
