= Borki, Gmina Gidle =

Borki
- Village
- Location within Poland
- Coordinates: 50°59′41.37″N 19°25′03.75″E
- Country: Poland
- Voivodeship: Łódź
- County: Radomsko
- Gmina: Gidle

Borki [ˈbɔrki] is a village in the administrative district of Gmina Gidle, within Radomsko County, Łódź Voivodeship, in central Poland.
