= Ludwików, Radomsko County =

Ludwików
- Village
- Location within Poland
- Coordinates: 50°58′20″N 19°25′52″E
- Country: Poland
- Voivodeship: Łódź
- County: Radomsko
- Gmina: Gidle

Ludwików [ludˈvikuf] is a village in the administrative district of Gmina Gidle, within Radomsko County, Łódź Voivodeship, in central Poland.
