= Ojrzeń, Łódź Voivodeship =

Ojrzeń
- Village
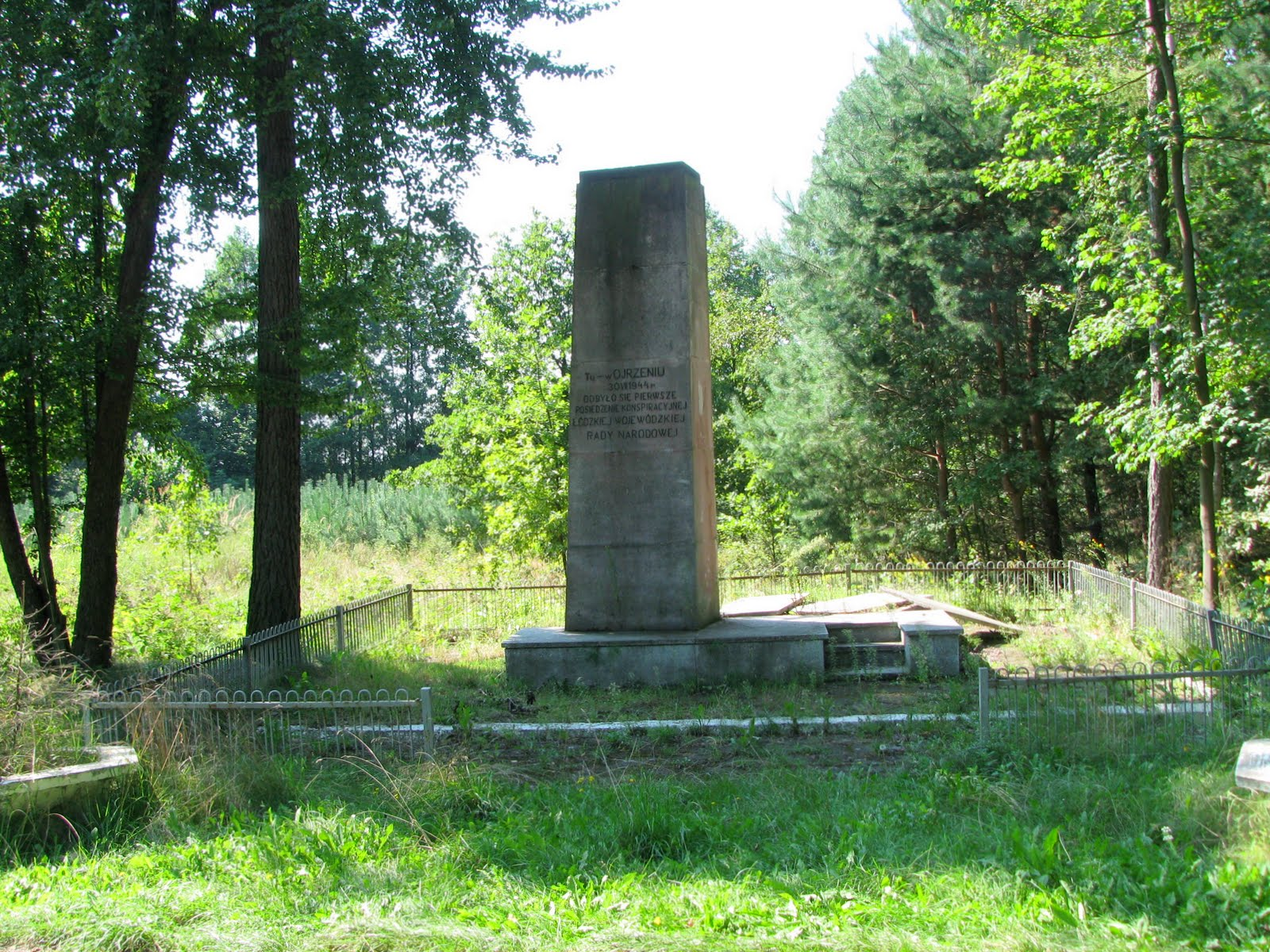

- Location within Poland
- Coordinates: 50°59′14″N 19°30′49″E
- Country: Poland
- Voivodeship: Łódź
- County: Radomsko
- Gmina: Gidle
- Population: 140

Ojrzeń [ˈɔi̯ʐɛɲ] is a village in the administrative district of Gmina Gidle, within Radomsko County, Łódź Voivodeship, in central Poland.
