= Kajetanowice =

- Village
- Location within Poland
- Coordinates: 50°53′30″N 19°29′38″E
- Country: Poland
- Voivodeship: Łódź
- County: Radomsko
- Gmina: Gidle

Kajetanowice [kajɛtanɔˈvit͡sɛ] is a village in the administrative district of Gmina Gidle, within Radomsko County, Łódź Voivodeship, in central Poland.

== History ==
On the night of 5 to 6 September 1939, soldiers of the Wehrmacht completely burned down the village and massacred about 76-80 Poles (the Kajetanowice massacre).
