= Huby Kotfińskie =

- Village
- Location within Poland
- Coordinates: 50°59′20″N 19°34′8″E
- Country: Poland
- Voivodeship: Łódź
- County: Radomsko
- Gmina: Gidle

Huby Kotfińskie [ˈxubɨ kɔtˈfiɲskʲɛ] is a village in the administrative district of Gmina Gidle, within Radomsko County, Łódź Voivodeship, in central Poland.
