= Ciężkowice, Łódź Voivodeship =

Ciężkowice
- Village
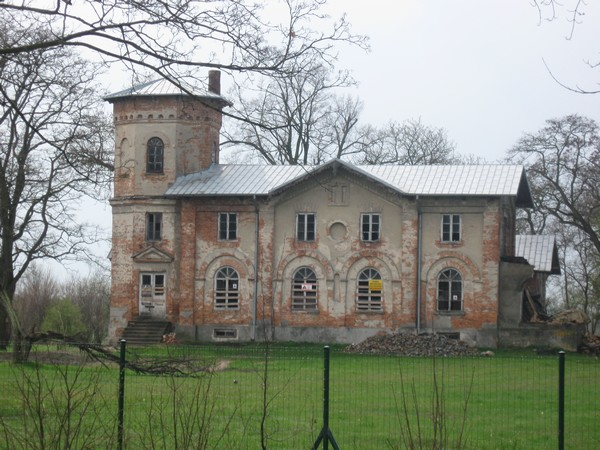
- Manor

- Location within Poland
- Coordinates: 50°55′N 19°31′E
- Country: Poland
- Voivodeship: Łódź
- County: Radomsko
- Gmina: Gidle

Ciężkowice [t͡ɕɛ̃ʂkɔˈvit͡sɛ] is a village in the administrative district of Gmina Gidle, within Radomsko County, Łódź Voivodeship, in central Poland.
