= Pławno, Łódź Voivodeship =

Pławno
- Village
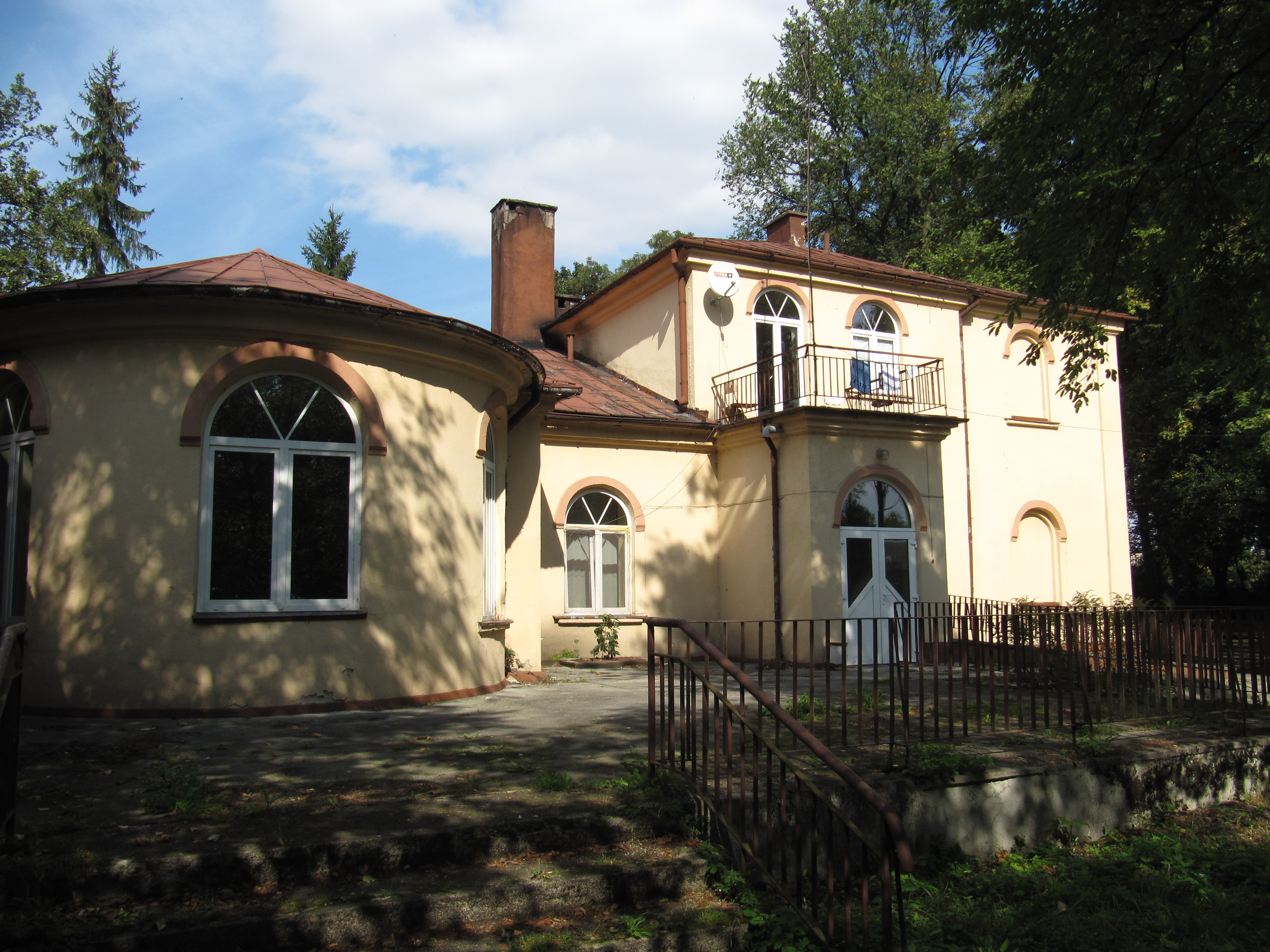
- Old manor house in Pławno

- Location within Poland
- Coordinates: 50°58′40″N 19°27′20″E
- Country: Poland
- Voivodeship: Łódź
- County: Radomsko
- Gmina: Gidle

Population
  - Total: 1,200
- Time zone: UTC+1 (CET)
  - Summer (DST): UTC+2 (CEST)
- Vehicle registration: ERA

Pławno [ˈpwavnɔ] is a village in the administrative district of Gmina Gidle, within Radomsko County, Łódź Voivodeship, in south-central Poland. The village has a population of 1,200. It is located in the Sieradz Land.

== History ==
Pławno was a private town of Polish nobility, administratively located in the Radomsko County in the Sieradz Voivodeship in the Greater Poland Province of the Kingdom of Poland.

=== World War II ===
On 4 September 1939, during the German invasion of Poland which started World War II, German troops carried out a massacre of Polish inhabitants of the village (see Nazi crimes against the Polish nation). Afterwards, the village was under German occupation until 1945. The fate of the Jews of Pławno was sealed in 1942. Mayoral orders of the German occupiers are quoted below.

22 January 1942

It is impossible to create a residential quarter for Jews (Ghetto) within the local district because there are 460 Jews in the district of Pławno, and the Pławno borough itself is too small to lodge that amount in a body. Moreover, the farmers residing here could not be removed from their dwellings and farm buildings. It would only be practicable to resettle the Jews from here to Ghetto in Radomsko.

Mayor of Pławno district.
Signed Karl Rusche [stamp]

In German: Es ist unmöglich innerhalb der hiesigen Gemeinde ein Judenwohnviertel (Ghetto) zu schaffen, weil die Gem. Pławno 460 Juden zählt und die Ortschaft Pławno is selbst zu klein, um in ihr diese Menge zusammen unterbringen zu können. Überdies könnten die hier wohnhaften Landwirte nicht von ihren Wohnhäusern und Wirtschaftsgebäuden ausgeschieden werden. Möglich wäre nur die Sache die Juden von hier aus nach Ghetto in Radomsko umzusiedeln.

Bürgermeister der Gem. Pławno
gez. Karl Rusche (stamp)

19 September 1942

"The resettlement of the Jews of Pławno to the Jewish residential quarter of the Pławno borough has to take place on 22 September 1942, until 18:00. The Jews must take all things and machines with them. The police take charge of the dwellings. No Jew must be present in the borough past the 22nd."

In German: Die Umsiedlung der Juden aus Pławno in den jüdischen Wohnbezirk der Stadt Radomsko hat am 22. September 1942 zu erfolgen bis 18.00 Uhr. Die Juden haben sämtliche Sachen und Geräte mitzunehmen. Die Wohnungen werden von der Gendarmerie in Verwahr genommen. Nach dem 22. darf sich kein Jude mehr in der Ortschaft aufhalten.
