= Zagórze, Gmina Gidle =

Zagórze
- Village
- Location within Poland
- Coordinates: 50°59′17″N 19°29′18″E
- Country: Poland
- Voivodeship: Łódź
- County: Radomsko
- Gmina: Gidle

Zagórze [zaˈɡuʐɛ] is a village in the administrative district of Gmina Gidle, within Radomsko County, Łódź Voivodeship, in central Poland.
