= Stanisławice, Radomsko County =

Stanisławice
- Village
- Location within Poland
- Coordinates: 50°59′16″N 19°27′29″E
- Country: Poland
- Voivodeship: Łódź
- County: Radomsko
- Gmina: Gidle
- Population: 200

Stanisławice [staniswaˈvit͡sɛ] is a village in the administrative district of Gmina Gidle, within Radomsko County, Łódź Voivodeship, in central Poland.
