= Górka, Łódź Voivodeship =

Górka
- Village
- Location within Poland
- Coordinates: 50°57′5″N 19°30′25″E
- Country: Poland
- Voivodeship: Łódź
- County: Radomsko
- Gmina: Gidle

Górka [ˈɡurka] is a village in the administrative district of Gmina Gidle, within Radomsko County, Łódź Voivodeship, in central Poland.
