= Zielonka, Łódź Voivodeship =

Zielonka
- Village
- Location within Poland
- Coordinates: 50°58′44″N 19°25′42″E
- Country: Poland
- Voivodeship: Łódź
- County: Radomsko
- Gmina: Gidle

Zielonka [ʑɛˈlɔŋka] is a village in the administrative district of Gmina Gidle, within Radomsko County, Łódź Voivodeship, in central Poland.
