= Spalastry =

- Village
- Location within Poland
- Coordinates: 50°54′28″N 19°32′22″E
- Country: Poland
- Voivodeship: Łódź
- County: Radomsko
- Gmina: Gidle

Spalastry [spaˈlastrɨ] is a village in the administrative district of Gmina Gidle, within Radomsko County, Łódź Voivodeship, in central Poland.
