= Piaski, Radomsko County =

Piaski
- Village
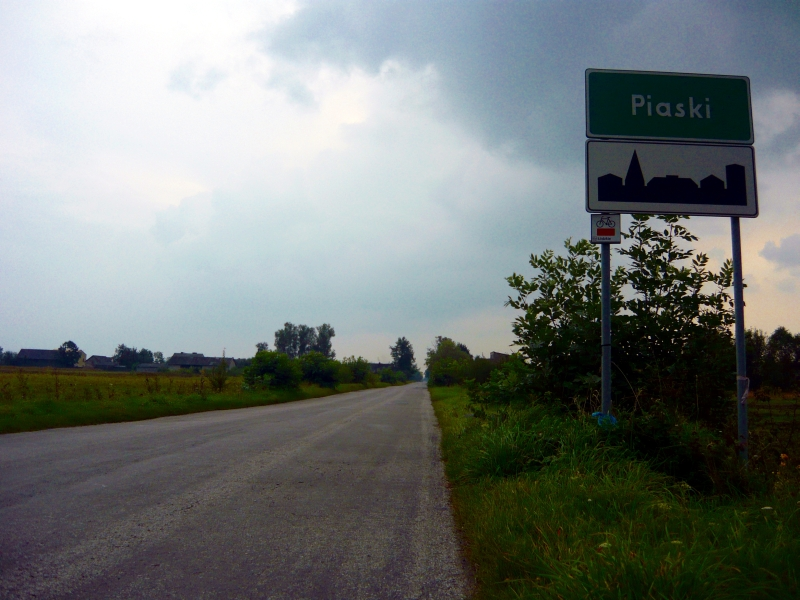

- Location within Poland
- Coordinates: 50°54′9″N 19°28′40″E
- Country: Poland
- Voivodeship: Łódź
- County: Radomsko
- Gmina: Gidle
- Time zone: UTC+1 (CET)
  - Summer (DST): UTC+2 (CEST)
- Postal code: 97-540
- Vehicle registration: ERA

Piaski (Polish pronunciation: [ˈpjaskʲi]) is a village in the administrative district of Gmina Gidle, within Radomsko County, Łódź Voivodeship, in central Poland.
