= Lasek-Kolonia =

- Village
- Location within Poland
- Coordinates: 50°58′52″N 19°27′50″E
- Country: Poland
- Voivodeship: Łódź
- County: Radomsko
- Gmina: Gidle

Lasek-Kolonia [ˈlasɛk kɔˈlɔɲa] is a village in the administrative district of Gmina Gidle, within Radomsko County, Łódź Voivodeship, in central Poland.
