= Chrostowa, Łódź Voivodeship =

Chrostowa
- Village
- Location within Poland
- Coordinates: 50°59′53″N 19°33′14″E
- Country: Poland
- Voivodeship: Łódź
- County: Radomsko
- Gmina: Gidle

Chrostowa [xrɔsˈtɔva] is a village in the administrative district of Gmina Gidle, within Radomsko County, Łódź Voivodeship, in central Poland.
