= Wygoda, Radomsko County =

Wygoda
- Village
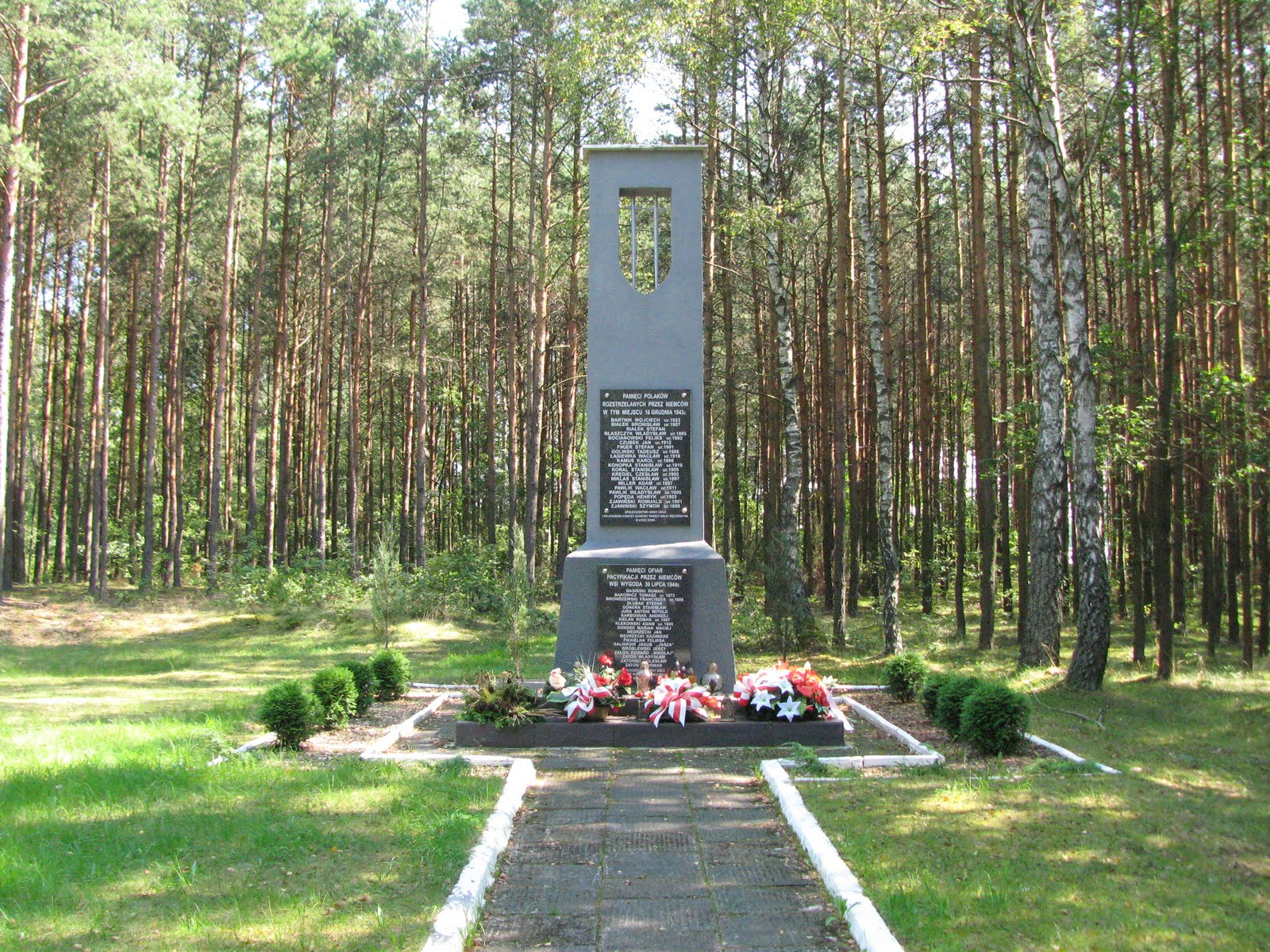

- Location within Poland
- Coordinates: 51°0′11″N 19°27′28″E
- Country: Poland
- Voivodeship: Łódź
- County: Radomsko
- Gmina: Gidle

Wygoda [vɨˈɡɔda] is a village in the administrative district of Gmina Gidle, within Radomsko County, Łódź Voivodeship, in central Poland.
