= Borowa, Gmina Gidle =

Borowa
- Village
- Location within Poland
- Coordinates: 50°54′35″N 19°28′55″E
- Country: Poland
- Voivodeship: Łódź
- County: Radomsko
- Gmina: Gidle
- Population: 350

Borowa [bɔˈrɔva] is a village in the administrative district of Gmina Gidle, within Radomsko County, Łódź Voivodeship, in central Poland.
