= Strzała, Łódź Voivodeship =

Strzała
- Village
- Location within Poland
- Coordinates: 50°58′40″N 19°28′52″E
- Country: Poland
- Voivodeship: Łódź
- County: Radomsko
- Gmina: Gidle

Strzała [ˈstʂawa] is a village in the administrative district of Gmina Gidle, within Radomsko County, Łódź Voivodeship, in central Poland.
