= Wojnowice, Łódź Voivodeship =

Wojnowice
- Village
- Location within Poland
- Coordinates: 50°56′41″N 19°31′7″E
- Country: Poland
- Voivodeship: Łódź
- County: Radomsko
- Gmina: Gidle

Wojnowice [vɔi̯nɔˈvit͡sɛ] is a village in the administrative district of Gmina Gidle, within Radomsko County, Łódź Voivodeship, in central Poland.
