= Stęszów, Łódź Voivodeship =

Stęszów
- Village
- Location within Poland
- Coordinates: 50°56′27″N 19°27′43″E
- Country: Poland
- Voivodeship: Łódź
- County: Radomsko
- Gmina: Gidle

Stęszów [ˈstɛ̃ʂuf] is a village in the administrative district of Gmina Gidle, within Radomsko County, Łódź Voivodeship, in central Poland.
