= Ruda (Rakovník District) =

- Municipality
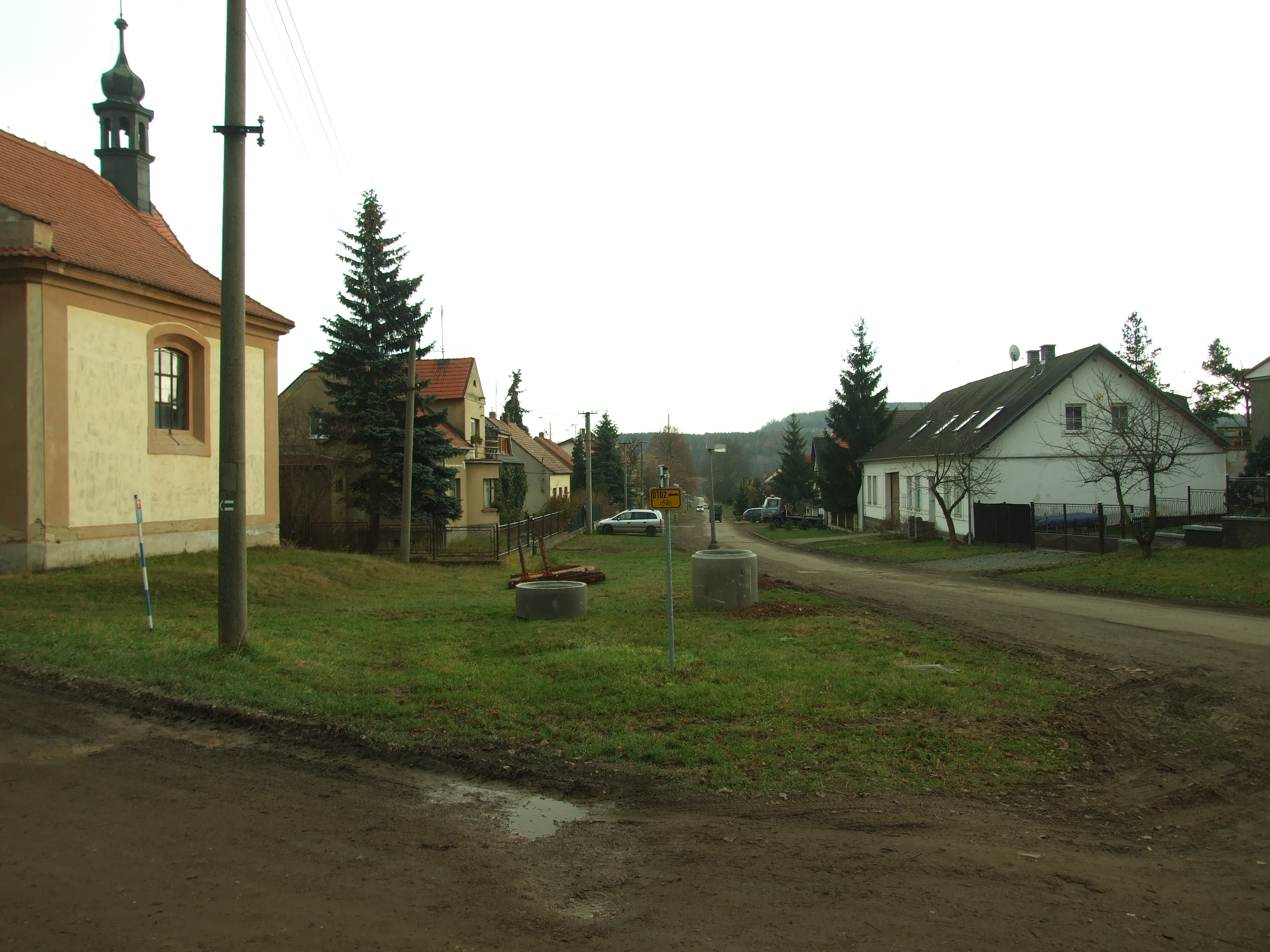
- Central part of Ruda

- Flag Coat of arms

- Location in the Czech Republic
- Coordinates: 50°8′27″N 13°52′33″E
- Country: Czech Republic
- Region: Central Bohemian
- District: Rakovník
- First mentioned: 1437

Area
  - Total: 21.67 km^{2} (8.37 sq mi)
- Elevation: 412 m (1,352 ft)

Population (2026-01-01)
  - Total: 824
  - Density: 38.0/km^{2} (98.5/sq mi)
- Time zone: UTC+1 (CET)
  - Summer (DST): UTC+2 (CEST)
- Postal code: 271 01
- Website: www.obec-ruda.cz

Ruda is a municipality and village in Rakovník District in the Central Bohemian Region of the Czech Republic. It has about 800 inhabitants.

== Etymology ==
The name literally means 'ore' in Czech, but it is not documented that it was ever mined here. It is therefore more likely that the name was derived from the personal name Ruda.

== Geography ==
Ruda is located about 11 kilometres (7 mi) northeast of Rakovník and 35 km (22 mi) west of Prague. It lies mostly in the Křivoklát Highlands, only a small northern part of the municipality extends into the Džbán range. The highest point is the hill Dlouhý hřeben at 470 m (1,542 ft) above sea level. The Klíčava Stream flows along the eastern municipal border and several its small tributaries crosses the territory of Ruda.

== History ==
The first written mention of Ruda is from 1379. Until the 16th century, the village was owned by various lesser noblemen. Around 1534, Ruda was acquired by the Nostitz family. In 1582, the village was acquired by the royal chamber and a pheasantry of Emperor Rudolf II was established near Ruda. During the Thirty Years' War, the village was badly damaged and in 1654 only one inhabitant lived there. However, it gradually recovered in the following decades.

After the formation of Czechoslovakia in 1918, the pheasantry was re-established. It was managed by the Forestry Administration of Lány Castle and served the presidents of Czechoslovakia and the Czech Republic. President Václav Havel organised informal meetings at the hunting lodge belonging to the pheasantry since 1992. The pheasantry was closed in 2024.

== Demographics ==
Historical population

Year	Pop.	±%
1869	950	—
1880	935	−1.6%
1890	812	−13.2%
1900	884	+8.9%
1910	879	−0.6%

Year	Pop.	±%
1921	852	−3.1%
1930	887	+4.1%
1950	650	−26.7%
1961	709	+9.1%
1970	682	−3.8%

Year	Pop.	±%
1980	616	−9.7%
1991	654	+6.2%
2001	652	−0.3%
2011	718	+10.1%
2021	770	+7.2%

Source: Censuses

== Transport ==
The railway line Prague–Rakovník runs through the northern part of the municipality, but there is no train station. The municipality is served by the station in neighbouring Nové Strašecí.

== Sights ==
Among the protected cultural monuments in the municipality are an architecturally valuable farmyard called Amálie, founded around 1820–1830, and a small Baroque chapel.
