= Zabrodzie, Łódź Voivodeship =

Zabrodzie
- Village
- Location within Poland
- Coordinates: 50°55′23″N 19°30′39″E
- Country: Poland
- Voivodeship: Łódź
- County: Radomsko
- Gmina: Gidle

Zabrodzie [zaˈbrɔd͡ʑɛ] is a village in the administrative district of Gmina Gidle, within Radomsko County, Łódź Voivodeship, in central Poland.
