= Ruda, Gmina Gidle =

Ruda
- Village
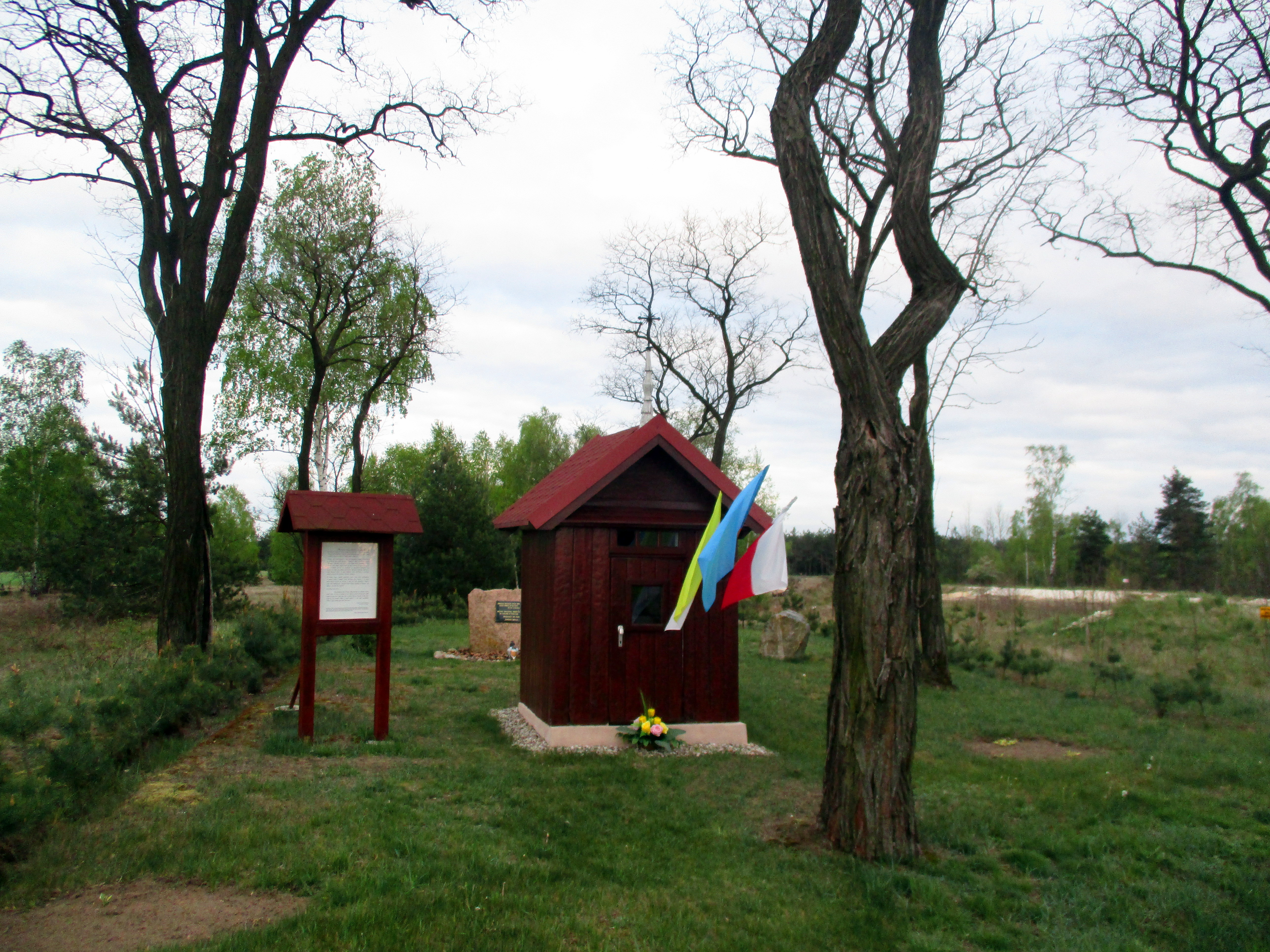
- Cholera epidemic cemetery

- Location within Poland
- Coordinates: 50°57′32″N 19°27′2″E
- Country: Poland
- Voivodeship: Łódź
- County: Radomsko
- Gmina: Gidle
- Population (approx.): 200
- Postal code: 97-540

Ruda [ˈruda] is a village in the administrative district of Gmina Gidle, within Radomsko County, Łódź Voivodeship, in central Poland.

In 2006 the village had an approximate population of 200.
