= Gmina Gidle =

Gmina Gidle Gidle Commune
- Gmina

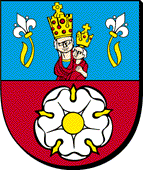
- Flag Coat of arms
- Interactive map of Gmina Gidle
- Coordinates (Gidle): 50°57′N 19°28′E
- Country: Poland
- Voivodeship: Łódź
- County: Radomsko
- Seat: Gidle

Area
  - Total: 116.32 km^{2} (44.91 sq mi)

Population (2006)
  - Total: 6,610
  - Density: 56.8/km^{2} (147/sq mi)
- Time zone: UTC+1 (CET)
  - Summer (DST): UTC+2 (CEST)
- Website: gidle.pl

Gmina Gidle is a rural gmina (administrative district) in Radomsko County, Łódź Voivodeship, in central Poland. Its seat is the village of Gidle, which lies approximately 13 kilometres (8 mi) south of Radomsko and 93 km (58 mi) south of the regional capital Łódź. It covers an area of 116.32 square kilometres (44.9 sq mi) and in 2006 had 6,610 residents.

== History ==
=== Second World War ===
During the German invasion of Poland in 1939, Wehrmacht soldiers murdered and burned 72 civilians of all ages and genders from the villages in the region.

== Villages ==
The following villages have the status of sołectwo:

- Borowa
- Ciężkowice
- Chrostowa
- Gidle
- Gowarzów
- Górka
- Graby
- Kajetanowice
- Kotfin
- Ludwików
- Michałopol
- Piaski
- Pławno
- Ruda
- Stanisławice
- Stęszów
- Włynice
- Wojnowice
- Wygoda
- Zabrodzie
- Zagórze

There are also eleven villages without sołectwo status:

- Młynek
- Huby Kotfińskie
- Niesulów
- Skrzypiec
- Borki
- Spalastry
- Lasek-Kolonia
- Zielonka
- Strzała
- Ojrzeń.

== Neighbouring gminas ==
Gmina Gidle is bordered by the gminas of Dąbrowa Zielona, Kłomnice, Kobiele Wielkie, Kruszyna, Radomsko and Żytno.
