= Graby, Łódź Voivodeship =

Graby
- Village
- Location within Poland
- Coordinates: 50°54′39″N 19°31′29″E
- Country: Poland
- Voivodeship: Łódź
- County: Radomsko
- Gmina: Gidle

Graby [ˈɡrabɨ] is a village in the administrative district of Gmina Gidle, within Radomsko County, Łódź Voivodeship, in central Poland.
