= Kotfin, Łódź Voivodeship =

Kotfin
- Village
- Location within Poland
- Coordinates: 50°58′57″N 19°33′57″E
- Country: Poland
- Voivodeship: Łódź
- County: Radomsko
- Gmina: Gidle

Kotfin [ˈkɔtfin] is a village in the administrative district of Gmina Gidle, within Radomsko County, Łódź Voivodeship, in central Poland.
