= Ruda, Novi Travnik =

Ruda
- Village
- Location within Bosnia and Herzegovina
- Coordinates: 44.1634753°N 17.5738214°E
- Country: Bosnia and Herzegovina
- Entity: Federation of Bosnia and Herzegovina
- Canton: Central Bosnia
- Municipality: Novi Travnik

Area
  - Total: 1.36 sq mi (3.52 km^{2})

Population (2013)
  - Total: 225
  - Density: 166/sq mi (63.9/km^{2})
- Time zone: UTC+1 (CET)
  - Summer (DST): UTC+2 (CEST)

Ruda is a village in the municipality of Novi Travnik, Bosnia and Herzegovina.

== Demographics ==
According to the 2013 census, its population was 225, all Croats.
