= Gidle =

- Village
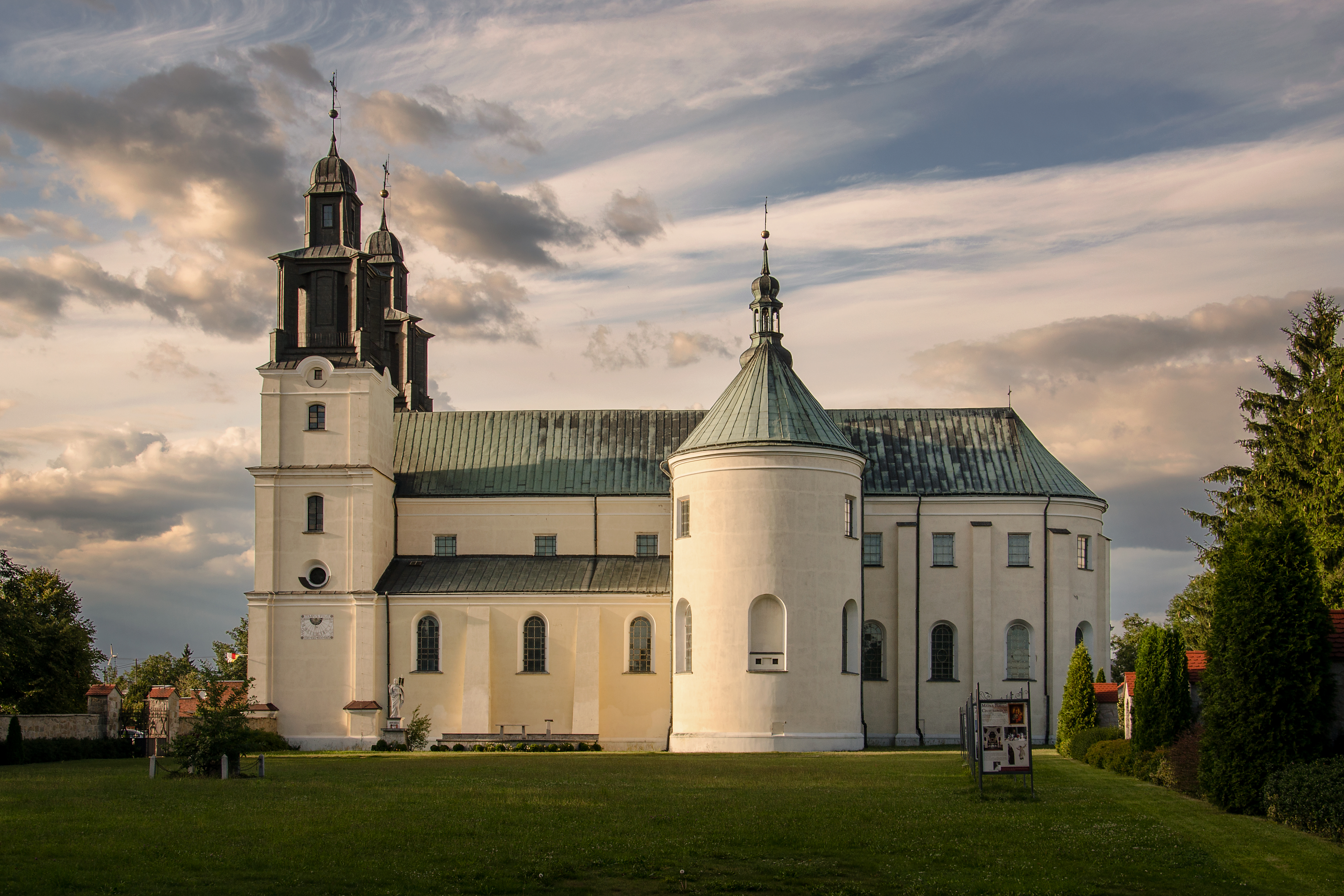
- Church of the Assumption of the Virgin Mary

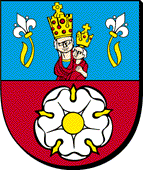
- Coat of arms

- Location within Poland
- Coordinates: 50°57′N 19°28′E
- Country: Poland
- Voivodeship: Łódź
- County: Radomsko
- Gmina: Gidle

Population
  - Total: 1,540
- Time zone: UTC+1 (CET)
  - Summer (DST): UTC+2 (CEST)
- Postal code: 97-540
- Vehicle registration: ERA
- Website: http://www.gidle.pl/

Gidle [ˈɡidlɛ] is a village in Radomsko County, Łódź Voivodeship, in south-central Poland. It is the seat of the gmina (administrative district) called Gmina Gidle. In 2007 the village had a population of 1,540.

== History ==
The previous names of the village included Gidzielice and Gidżle.

In the 17th century, Gidle was visited by King Władysław IV Vasa, Bishop of Wrocław Karol Ferdynand Vasa, King John II Casimir Vasa and King Michał Korybut Wiśniowiecki. As of 1827, Gidle had a population of 513.

Following the German-Soviet invasion of Poland, which started World War II in September 1939, the village was occupied by Germany until 1945. A local Polish policeman was murdered by the Russians in the Katyn massacre in 1940.

== Sights ==
Gidle is the site of a Dominican monastery with a chapel of the miraculous figure of Mary, mother of Jesus. The sanctuary is a destination of religious pilgrimages from all over Poland.

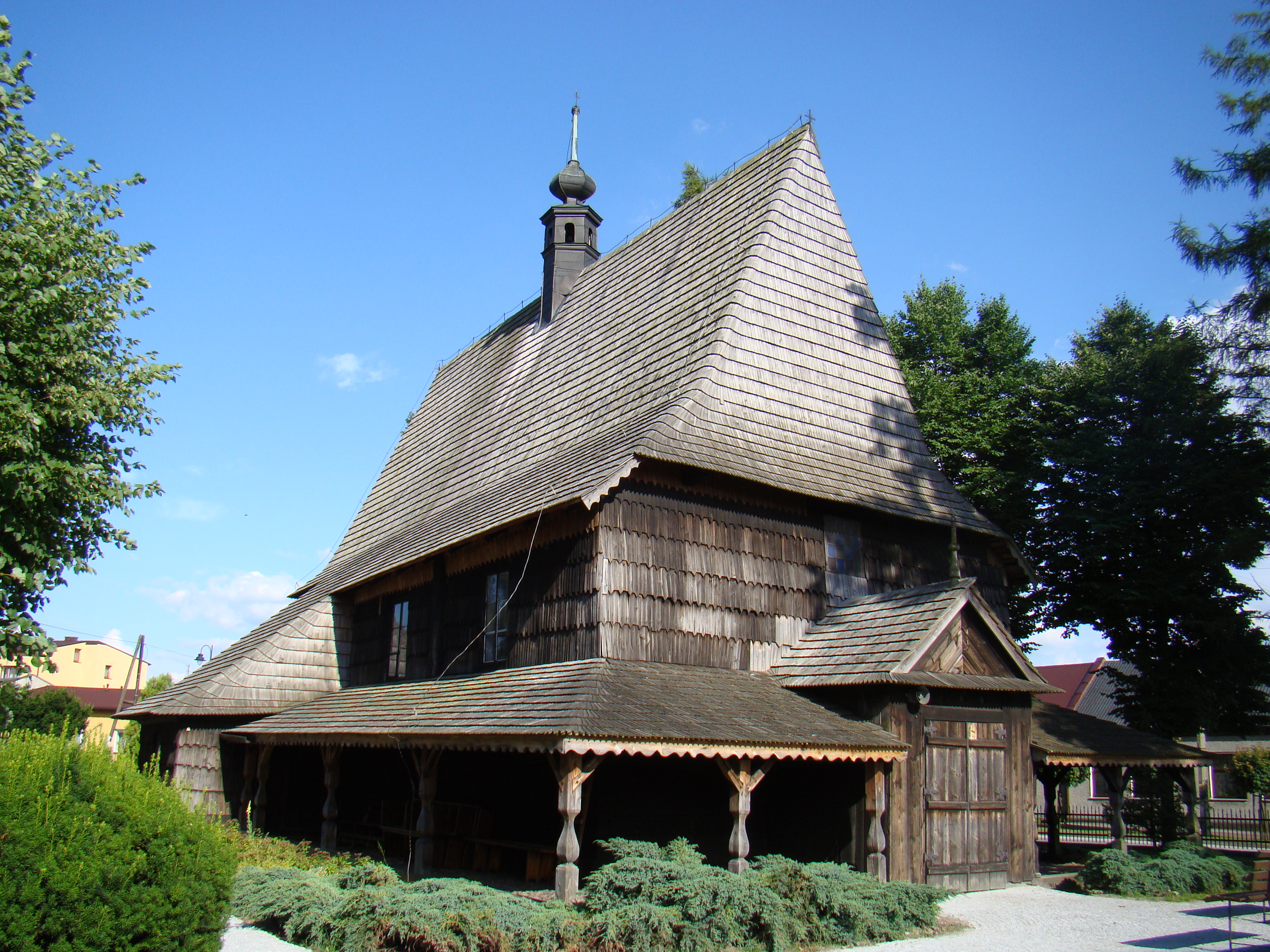
Mary Magdalene Church, built in 1659

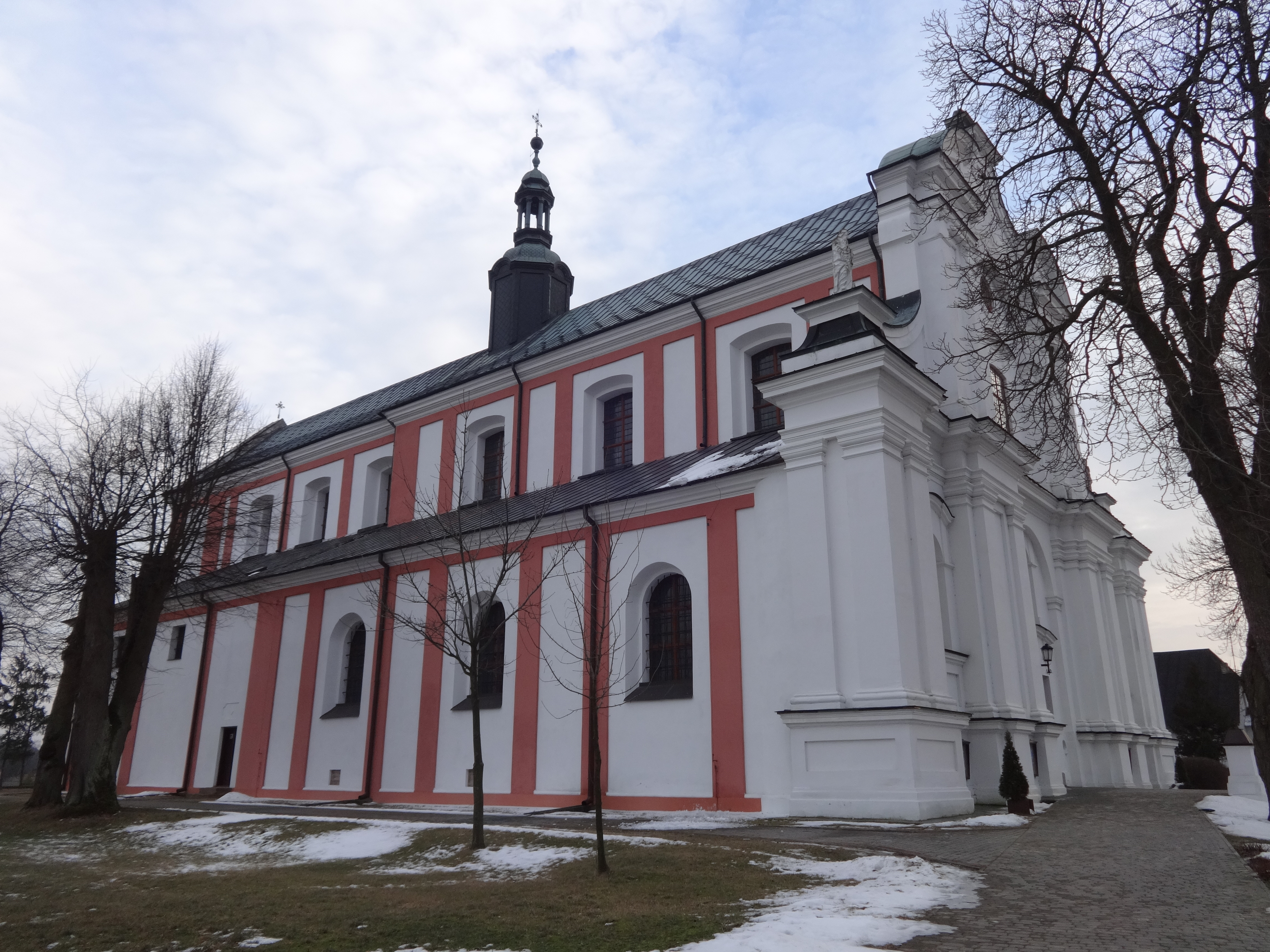
Carthusian Monastery

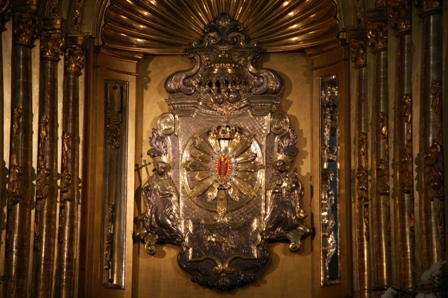
The stone figure at the main church

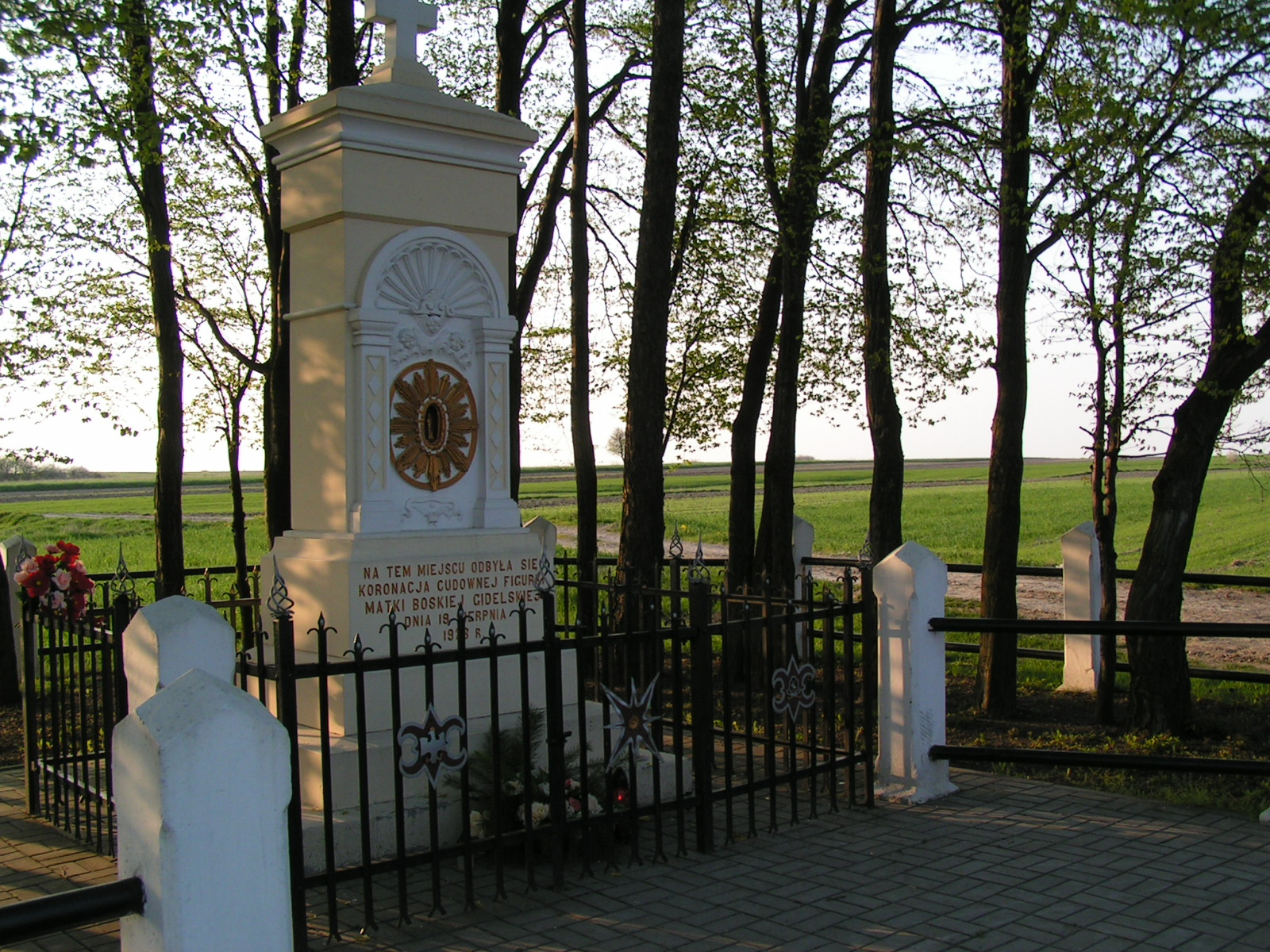
A roadside chapel

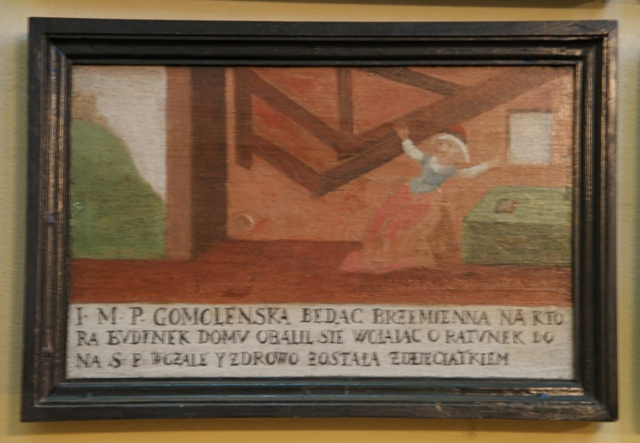
17th-century painted testimonies of miraculous healings

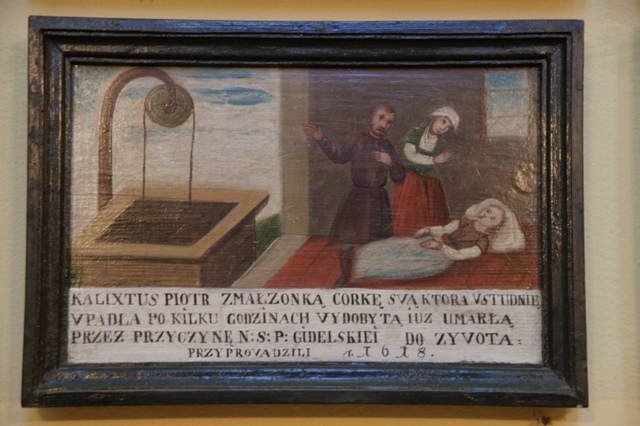
17th-century painted testimonies of miraculous healings

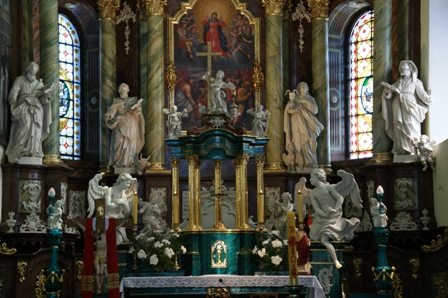
Main altar in the church

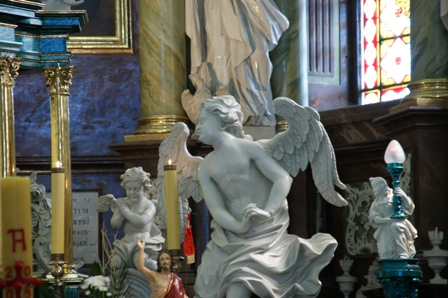
Details of the altar

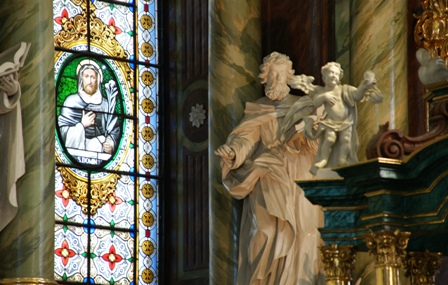
Stained-glass window showing St. Dominic
