= Skrzypiec, Łódź Voivodeship =

Skrzypiec
- Village
- Location within Poland
- Coordinates: 50°56′13″N 19°28′57″E
- Country: Poland
- Voivodeship: Łódź
- County: Radomsko
- Gmina: Gidle

Skrzypiec [ˈskʂɨpjɛt͡s] is a village in the administrative district of Gmina Gidle, within Radomsko County, Łódź Voivodeship, in central Poland.
