= Mordekhai Horowitz =

Polish businessperson and philanthropist

Markus Horowitz
- Born: 1895; Kolomea, Austria-Hungary (now - Kolomyia, Ukraine)
- Died: 25 October 1942 (aged 47); Kolomea, Third Reich
- Citizenship: Austria-Hungary; Second Polish Republic
- Occupations: Co-founder of curtain factory, philanthropist, head of Judenrat
- Years active: 1924-1939 (as entrepreneur); 1942 (as a chairman of Judenrat)
- Spouse: Bianca Horowitz (1900-1941)
- Parent: Leibish Horowitz (father)

Markus Horowitz, known as Mordekhai Horowitz (1895 – 25 October 1942) was the Polish-Jewish entrepreneur, co-founder of the curtain factory in Kolomyia and philanthropist. He is widely known as a chairman of Judenrat in 1942 during the German occupation of Kolomyia.

== Life before the WW2 ==
Markus (Mordekhai) Horowitz was born in 1895 to Leibish Horowitz, a descendant of the illustrious Horowitz family of Stanislau. He was a grandson of the respected rabbi Meshulam Horowitz of Stanislau (now Ivano-Frankivsk). His mother died in March 1927.

In the interwar period, he became a co-owner of his sister Maria Horowitz's curtain factory together with his brother-in-law Józef Horowitz. As of April 1934, he was a member of the board of the Municipal Communal Savings Bank, and the Property Owners' Association. In June 1936, he became a member of the civic committee for the construction of a building for educational institutions of the Jewish Society of Primary and Secondary Schools. Also, according to the memoirs of Jewish inhabitants of Kolomyia, representatives of the Jewish community wanted to elect him head of the community and for city council, but Markus Horowitz refused.

Along with his public and political activities, Marcus Horowitz was also involved in charity: at the end of February 1927, Horowitz allocated 15 zlotys to the Jewish People's Fund on the occasion of the 25th anniversary of its activity. He also donated to the Jewish National Kitchen during 1920s and 1930s. In April 1929, he donated 25 zlotys to the disposition fund of the Ministry of War Affairs. In March 1930, he joined in collecting funds (20 zlotys) to support "small traders struggling with difficulties".

== Life during the WW2 ==
After that Kolomyia was occupied by Nazi troops in 1941, Marcus headed the Judenrat in early 1942. Before that, as the State Archive of Ivano-Frankivsk Region claims, Klaus Volkmann summoned former members of the Jewish community board Mordekhai Horowitz and Yakov Shulman. They were ordered to head the Judenrat, which consisted of 6 people. By September 1, 1941, they were required to compile lists of all Jews living in the city and to pay a contribution of 2 million rubles to the city's German bank. A commission of 5 people was created, whose members went from house to house, collecting money and gold items.

At the Horowitz's curtain factory, the Nazis collected and sorted the furs and jewelry confiscated from the Jews by Judenrat, which were then sent to Lemberg.

Markus Horowitz, the chairman of the Jewish Council, moved into the Judenrat building, gave all his money to the Judenrat, and ate only in the soup kitchens. According to Chedva Kaufmann, when the latter, together with Lily Kreis, was rescuing Jewish children from the Nazis, she turned to the head of the Judenrat and reported the plight of the children - he gave them a place to house the children, over twenty of them, and supplied food and medical attention. This is how Chedva became the director of the orphanage with her assistant, Lily Kreis.

Markus Horowitz was died on October 25, 1942 with his sister Maria, committing suicide in Judenrat's main office. They were buried in Jewish cemetery in Kolomyia.

== Personal life ==
In October 1927, he married Bianca Horowitz of the Bleicher family. Marek Lachs, Mojszesz Schneeberg, Meshulim Frenkl, and other Jewish families expressed their congratulations in the local press. His wife was born in 1900 in Kolomyia and died during the Holocaust in her hometown in 1941. According to the recollections of Jewish people of Kolomyia, on September 12, 1941, when the Gestapo detained two thousand Jews in Kolomyia, among whom was Horowitz's wife, friends advised him to contact the Gestapo with a request for her release, but Marcus refused. As a result, his wife died at the hands of the Nazis.
