= Maria Horowitz =

Polish businessperson and philanthropist

- Born: 1892; Kolomea, Austria-Hungary (now - Kolomyia, Ukraine)
- Died: 25 October 1942 (aged 50); Kolomea, Third Reich
- Citizenship: Austria-Hungary; Second Polish Republic
- Occupations: Co-founder of curtain factory, philanthropist
- Years active: 1924-1939
- Awards: (1937)

Maria Horowitz, known as Miriam Horowitz (1892 – 25 October 1942) was the Polish-Jewish female entrepreneur, co-founder of the curtain factory in Kolomyia and philanthropist.

== Biography ==
Maria Horowitz was born on 1892 in Kolomea in the family of the inheritors of dynasty of rabbis ruled in Stanislau.

In the beginning of 1920s Horowitz was a member of Society of Rigorous Students in Jewish Academic Home in Lwów.

In 1924, Maria Horowitz with her brother Markus Horowitz and brother-in-law Josef Horowitz firstly established a curtain factory in Kolomyia. It was located in the central part of town. Her factory was famous for export of curtains to Galicia, Europe and the United States. About 180 female and male labours worked in her factory, and more than 300 ones worked distantly (according to Myroslava Kocherzhuk) - summarily, there were from 400 till 700 labours in Horowitz's factory. The factory used 30 curtain machines from Singer Corporation, purchased by Maria Horowitz in 1925.

In 1928, Maria Horowitz was included into the executive committee of the mobile industrial exhibition in Kolomyia.

Maria was a philanthropist: she donated to the Jewish National Kitchen during 1920s and 1930s and financially helped the Society for the Care of Poor Jewish Children in April 1927. Also, Maria Horowitz was a supporter and sympathizer of the Society of the Association of Blind Workers.

On January 10, 1934, her factory was entered into the state trade register by the decision of the District Court in Kolomyia.

On August 11, 1937 Felicjan Sławoj Składkowski awarded Maria Horowitz the Silver Cross of Merit in honor of the field of professional activity.

In 1939, her curtain factory was taken over and nationalized by Soviet regime after the Soviet invasion of Poland.

During the German occupation of Ukraine in 1941, at the Horowitz's curtain factory, the Nazis collected and sorted the furs and jewelry confiscated from the Jews by Judenrat ruled by Maria's brother Markus Horowitz, which were then sent to Lemberg.

Maria Horowitz was died on October 25, 1942, with her brother Markus, committing suicide in Judenrat's main office. They were buried in Jewish cemetery in Kolomyia.

== Memory ==
In May 2020, the author of the project of the first "Heavenly Hundred" Museum in Ukraine in Ivano-Frankivsk, the author of Ukraine's largest painting "Chronicle of Ukraine", an artist from Ivano-Frankivsk Roman Bonchuk created a mural in honor of Maria Horowitz on the wall of the house, where her factory was.

In 2024, she was included into the list of female people who influenced the cultural and political life of Kolomyia at the beginning of the 20th century.
