= Sadzhavka =

Rural locality in Ivano-Frankivsk Oblast, Ukraine

Sadzhavka Саджавка Sadzawka
- Village
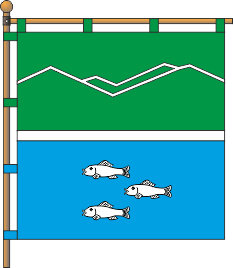
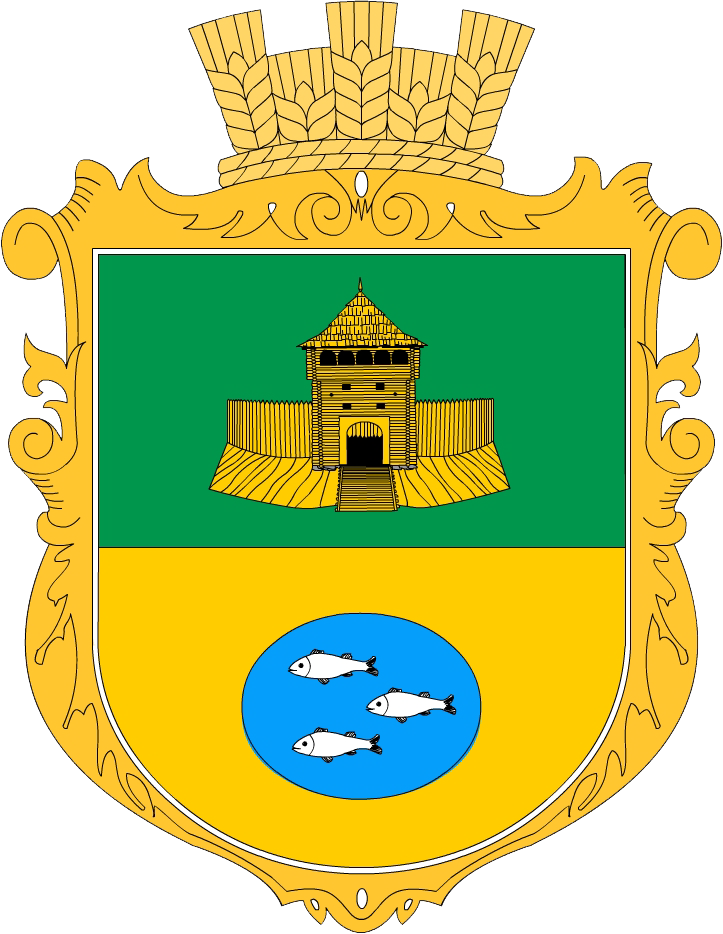
- Flag Coat of arms

- Location within Ivano-Frankivsk Oblast Location within Ukraine
- Coordinates: 48°34′10″N 24°47′35″E
- Country: Ukraine
- Oblast (province): Ivano-Frankivsk Oblast
- Raion (district): Kolomyia Raion
- Founded: 1400

Population
  - Total: 3,438

Sadzhavka (Ukrainian: Саджавка, Polish: Sadzawka, Romanian: Sadjavka) is a village located in Kolomyia Raion in Ivano-Frankivsk Oblast in western Ukraine. It belongs to Kolomyia urban hromada, one of the hromadas of Ukraine.

From the mid-14th century until 1772 (see Partitions of Poland) the village was part of the Kingdom of Poland. In 1772, it was annexed by the Habsburg Empire, and remained in the province of Galicia until late 1918. In the inter-war years, the borders changed and the town became part of the Second Polish Republic. Following the 1939 Invasion of Poland, it was annexed into the Ukrainian SSR (see also Molotov–Ribbentrop pact). The village was occupied by the Germans in 1941 during World War II. After the war it was once again absorbed into the Ukrainian SSR. Since its independence in 1991, the village has been part of Ukraine.

Until 2018, Sadzhavka belonged to Nadvirna Raion. In July 2018, it was announced that the village was considering breaking away from Nadvirna raion and instead joining with the nearby city of Kolomyia. Indeed, on 6 September 2018 Sadzhavka was subordinated to the city of oblast significance. In July 2020, as part of the administrative reform of Ukraine, which reduced the number of raions of Ivano-Frankivsk Oblast to six, the city of Kolomyia was merged into Kolomyia Raion.

== Administration ==
The following people have served as the heads of the village in the years since Ukraine's independence:

- Mykhailo Ilkovych Khrystan (1990–1994)
- Mykola Andriyovych Khrystan (1994–2002)
- Mykhailo Yakovych Dzhyhryniuk (2002–2004)
- Oleh Mykhailovych Kysliak (2005–2010)
- Mykhailo Ilkovych Khrystan (2010-2015)
- Andrii Ivanovych Kuzmyn (2015-2020)
- Vasyl Vasyliovych Khrystan (since 2020)

== See also ==
- Nadvirna
- Nadvorna (Hasidic dynasty)
