= Adolf Frisch =

Polish doctor and political activist

- Born: 3 October 1891; Kolomea, Austria-Hungary (now – Kolomyia, Ukraine)
- Died: 26 March 1943 (aged 51); Kolomea, Third Reich
- Citizenship: Austria-Hungary; Second Polish Republic
- Education: University of Vienna
- Occupations: Community and political activist, doctor of medicine

Adolf Frisch (3 October 1891 – 26 March 1943) was a Polish doctor of medicine and political activist of Jewish origin, head of a local branch of the Jewish party "Bund" in Kolomyia.

== Biography ==
Adolf Frisch was born on October 3, 1891, in Kolomea, in a family of Mordechai Frisch, a cloth shop owner. He first studied at a primary religious school, then studied at the local Polish gymnasium in 1901–1909. In the 8th grade of the gymnasium, he gave a lecture on "Philosophy from the Most Ancient Times to Plato" in the philosophy and natural science club under the leadership of prof. Strutiński.

He later enrolled at the University of Vienna, where, with interruptions due to service in the Austrian army, he received his doctorate in July 1917. He was a dermatologist and venereologist by specialty, and since 1921 he was an internal medicine physician.

In the early 1920s, he returned to his hometown and opened a medical office at Mickiewicz str., 4, as stated in an advertisement in the local newspaper "Prawda Pokucka" on March 18, 1923. He performed quartz lamp irradiation for tuberculosis, scoliosis, ischemia, skin diseases and hair loss. He repeatedly received thanks in the press from the parents of the patients he cured or from them: in a local newspaper "Nasz Głos" on April 1, 1927, tailor Mechel Winkler thanked him for "the selfless cure of my son", and in February 1933, Jakub Krynica expressed his gratitude for the 4-week cure of his wife, who suffered from constant arthritis.

On June 4, 1928, Frisch saved Rosenbaum Lelb, who lived in a house at Sienkiewicz str., 88 and had suffered a gunshot wound to the right side of the chest: at 1 a.m. that day, an unknown person broke into the house. The owner, awakened by a suspicious noise and seeing a thief in his apartment, jumped out of bed and began to scream and call for help. The thief, apparently realizing that his work had been exposed and fearing that the owner's screams would bring people who could catch him, shot the owner and escaped through the window through which he had entered the house. The victim was taken to the county hospital on Frisch's orders. On January 26, 1932, he provided first aid to 78-year-old Perla Velebniker, who had committed suicide due to a nervous breakdown and lived at Zamkova Street, 1. She had cut her throat with a dirty kitchen knife, which led to an infection in her body, that caused her death the following day.

Adolf Frisch was also the chief physician of the Jewish hospital for many years.

In the interwar period, in parallel with his medical activities, he was the leader of the local branch of a famous Jewish party "Bund" in Kolomyia. Also he actively translated Shakespeare's plays and Goethe's "Faust" into Yiddish. In 1938, Frisch's poetry collection, "Libe nisht Mer" was published in his native town.

During the Soviet occupation in 1939–1941, he worked as a doctor in the dermatology department of a hospital in Kolomyia. He was fluent in German, Polish, and Ukrainian.

Frisch remained in Kolomyia during the German occupation since 1941. He died on March 26, 1943. There are several versions of his death: according to one version, he hanged himself in a German prison, according to another one, he committed suicide in a local cemetery while awaiting execution. According to the memoirs of Mariia Keivan, the body of Frisch was found in the morning on Szpitalna Street (now - Shukhevycha Street).
