= Dmytro Stankevych =

Ukrainian doctor & political activist (1891–1942)

- Born: 13 December 1891; Sloboda-Runhurska, Austria-Hungary (now – Sloboda, Ukraine)
- Died: 25 July 1942 (aged 50); Kolomea, Third Reich
- Citizenship: Austria-Hungary; Second Polish Republic
- Education: Secret Ukrainian University; University of Poznan; University of Vienna
- Occupations: Community and political activist, doctor of medicine
- Years active: 1931–1942
- Spouse: Mariia Stankevych
- Children: Liubov, Volodymyra, Omelian
- Parent(s): Semen Stankevych; Mariia Kovalska

Dmytro Semenovych Stankevych (Polish: Dymitr Stankiewicz; Ukrainian: Дмитро Семенович Станкевич; 13 December 1891 – 25 July 1942) was a Ukrainian doctor of medicine (radiologist) and political activist, member and co-founder of the local branches of the Ukrainian Medical and Ukrainian Hygienic Societies.

== Biography ==
Dmytro Stankevych was born on December 13, 1901 in a village of Sloboda-Runhurska in the peasant family of Semen Stankevych and Mariia Kovalska. He received his secondary education at the local Ukrainian Gymnasium, which he graduated from in 1921. In the 6th grade of the gymnasium, at the age of 16, he joined the ranks of the Ukrainian Sich Riflemen and later, as an artillery centurion, he participated in the liberation struggle in the ranks of the Ukrainian Galician Army.

After graduating from high school, he entered the Secret Ukrainian University in Lviv, which he graduated in 1928. In 1929, he had his diploma nostrified at the University of Poznań, where he became a member of the Ukrainian Society of Medicine and completed an internship, and in 1930, he specialized in radiology in Vienna.

In 1931, together with his wife Maria, he moved to Kolomyia. According to the research of a local historian Illya Kryvoruchko, at the same time he built a villa at the then Sobieskiego Street, 76 (now — Hrushevsky Street, 76), where he received patients together with the deputy chief physician of the county hospital, therapist Mieczysław Szajna from 8 to 10 am and from 3 to 5 pm. He also began working as a radiologist at the county hospital and had his own medical office at 49 Piłsudskiego Street (now — Chornovil Street).

After founding a public outpatient clinic for the poor in 1932, he worked there as a radiologist together with Jewish and Ukrainian doctors. In Kolomyia, he became a co-founder of branches of the Ukrainian Medical (1933) and Ukrainian Hygienic Societies (1930), as well as a member of the "Kameniary". According to the newspaper "Dilo" on March 1, 1933, he allocated 5 zlotys to finance the "Prosvita" society. In September 1938, he organized the anniversary celebration of "Prosvita" in Kolomyia.

During the Soviet occupation, he worked as a radiologist in the former county hospital. With the onset of the German occupation in November 1941, he became deputy chairman and secretary of the Ukrainian District Committee in Kolomyia.

However, he later fell ill with tuberculosis and died on July 25, 1942 in Kolomyia.

He is survived by his wife, Mariia Stankevych, and three children.
