= Stefan Witold Matejko =

Polish painter and stained-glass designer (1871–1935)

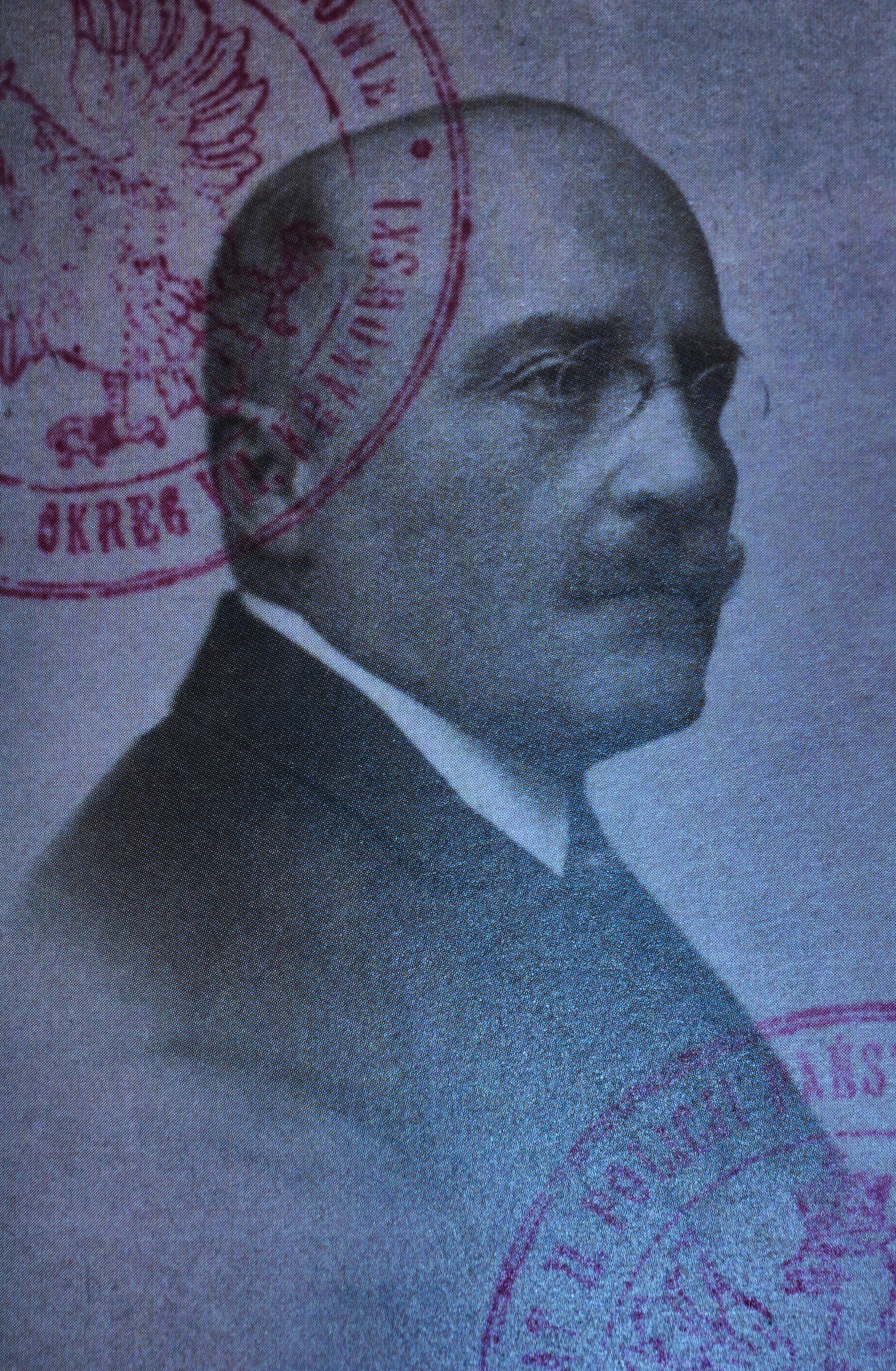
- Born: 5 May 1871; Kolomyia, now Ivano-Frankivsk Oblast, Ukraine
- Died: 5 February 1935 (aged 63); Kraków, Poland
- Education: Kraków Academy of Arts, Munich Academy of Arts
- Occupations: Painter and stained-glass designer

Stefan Witold Matejko (5 May 1871 – 5 February 1935) was a Polish painter and stained-glass designer.

== Biography ==
Stefan Witold Matejko was born on 5 May 1871, in Kolomyia.

In 1892, he graduated from the Kraków Academy of Arts (his specialized teachers were L. Lefler, W. Łuszczkiewicz, and J. Matejko), and in 1893, from the Munich Academy of Arts. From 1893, he was active in Kraków, where from 1905–1914, he was the chief artist for Stanisław Gabriel Żeleński stained-glass and mosaic firm.

He died on 5 February 1935, in Kraków. He is buried in Rakowicki Cemetery.

== Works ==
From 1909, he began presenting his works at exhibitions. Matejko created paintings with human figures, painted portraits, and drew landscapes. He also engaged in monumental painting.

Between 1889 and 1891, together with students of Jan Matejko and under his guidance, he worked on decorating the interior of the Church of the Assumption of the Blessed Virgin Mary in Kraków with frescoes. Also, in the 1890s, he painted frescoes in Kraków's churches of St. Nicholas and Basilica of St. Francis of Assisi. In 1917–1918, together with Juliusz Makarewicz, he restored the Old Ruthenian frescoes of the Holy Trinity Chapel, located in Lublin Castle.

From 1905 to 1914, Matejko designed stained glass and mosaics for numerous churches in Galicia:

- the parish Roman Catholic church in Ternopil (6 stained-glass windows inspired by Jan Matejko's works, as well as a composition with the city's coat of arms, 1907–1908; all are not preserved),
- stained-glass windows for churches in the towns of Turka (now Lviv Oblast, 1907), Zboriv (now Ternopil Oblast), Nienadówka (1913, now Podkarpackie Voivodeship, Poland),
- mosaics for the chapel of the Jesuit school in Khyriv (now Lviv Oblast, 1907–08).
- stained-glass windows in the southern part of the presbytery of the church in Drohobych (now Lviv Oblast, 1907–1909; among his best works).

The preserved stained-glass windows Częstochowa Madonna and Calvary Madonna show a clear influence of Stanisław Wyspiański and Józef Mehoffer. In these works, the figures of the Virgin Mary and angels have refined silhouettes, surrounded by large flowers.

In 1909, at the Church Exhibition in Lviv, he presented his stained-glass windows Saint Anne and Christ, as well as the mosaics Madonna and Częstochowa Mother of God. He also created numerous sketches for stained-glass windows (cartoons) for Lviv buildings. Particularly well-known among them are the stained-glass windows in the Technological Institute (now the Lviv Music Academy), which illustrate themes of Galicia's economy (created in 1909). Of these, an image of the Subcarpathian railway has survived to this day. Overall, features of the Secession style are clearly visible in his monumental works. Some of his works are preserved in the collections of the Borys Voznytsky Lviv National Art Gallery.

Among his important paintings are: "U parku", "Bilia tsvyntarnoi bramy" (both 1892), "Cholovichok u serednovichnomu odyazi" (1893), "Dama" (1896), "Silska divchyna", "Bilia krynytsi", "U lisi" (all 1898), "Torhova ploshcha" (1902), "Osin", "Zymovyi kraievyd", "Poliova doroha" (all 1903), "Za nakazom" (1918), "Nimfa", "Zhovtyi metelyk", "Sviatoivanivski svitliachky" (all 1922).
