= Julia Angeliuk =

Ukrainian artist (born 1997)

- Born: February 5, 1997 (age 29); Kolomyia, Ivano-Frankivsk region, Ukraine
- Citizenship: Ukraine
- Education: Kosiv State Institute of Applied and Decorative Arts; Jan Matejko Academy of Fine Arts
- Known for: painting, volunteering
- Movement: Authentical art

Julia Yuriivna Angeliuk (Ukrainian: Юлія Юріївна Ангелюк; born 5 February 1997) is a Ukrainian painter, volunteer and entrepreneur.

== Biography ==
Julia Angeliuk was born on 5 February 1997 in Kolomyia, Ukraine. Her grandfather was a joiner, and her uncle was a carver and painter.

She began painting since childhood. Angeliuk firstly studied at the art school, then she went to Kosiv State Institute of Applied and Decorative Arts. At the age of 15, Julia began painting her portraits and drawing to order. Later she studied at the famous Jan Matejko Academy of Fine Arts. During studying, she made her paintings on the walls of beauty salons “Anael” and “Infinyty”, in the bar “Soprano”, restaurants “Chilim” and “Filvarok” in Kolomyia.

Then she returned to Ukraine and founded her own art school "Angeliuk.art".

In 2020, Angeliuk created her own mural near economical college with the mainest buildings of Kolomyia. In July 2021, during the art festival "Art-vision", Julia created a new mural in the centre of town, with loving couple of Hutsuls.

During the Russian invasion of Ukraine, Angeliuk began to volunteer. But later she went to Poland and Great Britain to raise funds for the Ukrainian Armed Forces with her master classes. In June 2022, Julia taught the fluid art therapy for displaced people and teenagers with disabilities in Chernivtsi. Then, in the early fall of that year, the painter traveled with an exhibition “I am Mariupol, I am Azovstal” around Kraków, Warsaw, Gdańsk, Berlin, Brussels and Paris, where she painted drawings with motanka dolls, immediately sold for donation to the Ukrainian army. On 13 October, she took part in 'Free Mariupol Defenders Protest' in Kraków's Main Square.

In 2023, with the founder of foundation "Strength of kindness" Ruslan Pavlov, Angeliuk organized her art project "Warrior's Amulet" for donation to the Ukrainian army. In May, she organized a charity exhibition and auction "On the Edge of Life" in Potocki Palace in Kraków, in cooperation with the organization "The Sun of Ukraine". The exhibition included 35 works, which depicted a symbol-amulet - a motanka doll, as well as various paintings in the ethnic Ukrainian style.
