= Antonina Hulles =

Polish businessperson and philanthropist

- Born: January 19, 1872; Kolomea, Austria-Hungary (now – Kolomyia, Ukraine)
- Died: 1942; Belzec extermination camp, Third Reich
- Citizenship: Austria-Hungary; Second Polish Republic
- Occupations: Community and political activist, philanthropist
- Years active: 1907–1939
- Spouse: Samuel Hulles
- Children: Bronislawa Wagmann
- Parent(s): Samuel Friedman (father); Lea Friedman (mother)

Antonina Hulles (née Friedman), known as Antonina Hullesowa (19 January 1872 – 1942) was the Polish-Jewish community activist in Kolomyia and philanthropist.

== Biography ==
Antonina Friedman was born on January 19, 1872, in Kolomyia, to the Jewish family of Samuel and Leah Friedman.

She is firstly mentioned as a community activist in the local newspaper "Goniec Pokucki" of July 4, 1907, where she is considered as a person who spoke at the Society of Public Schools.

As of 1925, she was a member of the Society for the Care of Jewish Orphans, as well as deputy head of the Jewish Council for Orphans and Youth Protection. In 1928, Antonina Hulles fruitfully collaborated with the "Brotherhood" society, which allocated 150 zlotys for the maintenance of the Jewish Orphanage. In October 1928, invited by the head of Starostwo Skwarczynski, she was included in the discussion of the celebration of the 10th anniversary of Polish independence. In January 1930, Hulles became the head of the Jewish National Kitchen. In May 1930, Antonina Gulles joined the organizing committee of the Kolomyia branch of the International Women's Jewish Organization "Wizo".

During the 1930s, she was a teacher at the Jewish Orphanage, which she financially supported.

Hulles later joined the advisory board in November 1932 and, together with Sozhanska, headed its social welfare department in January 1933. During 1932 and 1933, Hulles, in cooperation with Singer, created the Committee at the Jewish Kitchen to provide assistance to schoolchildren.

In December 1933, she became a candidate for city council, which she later became, and in 1934 she became a delegate to the Jewish Committee of the section of the Guardianship Society under the city council. In January 1935, she became a member of the committee for the development of Polish schools outside Poland within the framework of the Polish Education Abroad Foundation.

In June 1937, she was a member of one of the districts of the board of trustees under the city council, that was in charge of the German colonies on the outskirts of Kolomyia.

Hulles was also an active philanthropist: she repeatedly allocated funds for the maintenance of the Jewish People's Kitchen.

In 1942, Antonina Gulles died in the Belzec concentration camp.

== Personal life ==
Antonina Hulles was married to Samuel Hulles, a long-time accountant at the Savings Bank, who died on December 7, 1929. On June 9, 1895, she gave birth to a daughter, Bronisława Hulles (Wagmann), who also perished during the Holocaust in the Belzec concentration camp.
