= Karl Maramorosch =

American plant pathologist (1915–2016)

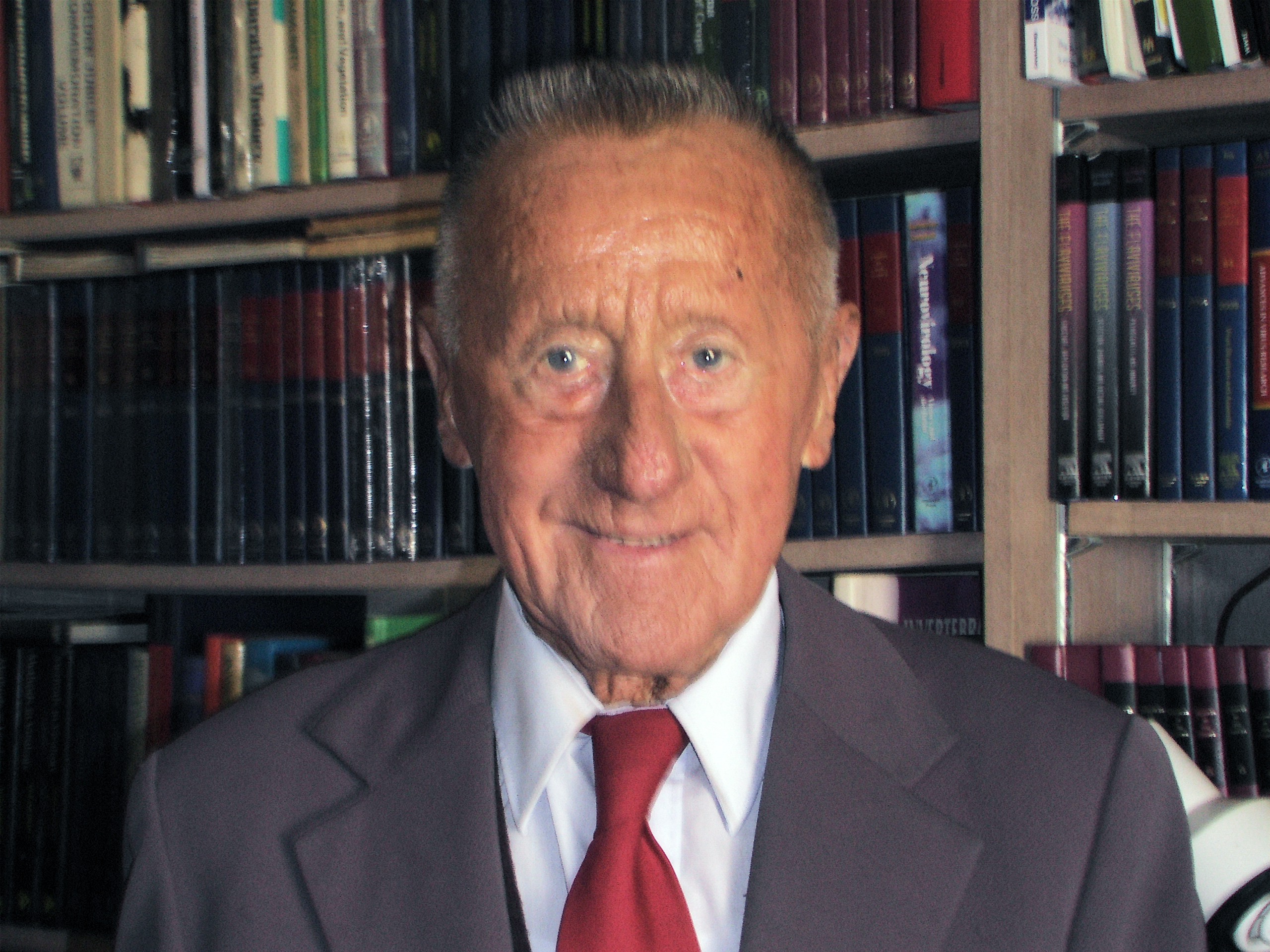
Karl Maramorosch, 2009

Karl Maramorosch (January 16, 1915 – May 9, 2016) was an Austrian-born American virologist, entomologist, and plant pathologist. A centenarian and polyglot, he conducted research on viruses, mycoplasmas, rickettsiae, and other micro-organisms; and their transmission to plants through insect vectors in many parts of the world. He is the co-author of a textbook on techniques in virology and is the author of numerous papers on the biology and ecology of plant viruses, their hosts, and vectors. He received the Wolf Prize in Agriculture in 1980 for his contribution to the study of crop pathogens.

== Early life and education ==
Maramorosch was born in Vienna on January 16, 1915, where his family had escaped to from Soroki present day Moldova, during the World War I. His family was Jewish. His Polish father was a graduate of the Vienna Agricultural University. His mother was from Croatia and she was a gifted pianist who could speak German, Italian, French, Serbo-Croat and English. Along with his siblings he spoke to his father in Polish and in German with his mother. He grew up in Kołomyja, Poland (now Ukraine) where he attended primary and secondary schools (Gimnazjum Kazimierza Jagiellończyka) and from age of seven took piano lessons for twelve years, graduating from the Moniuszko Conservatory in Stanisławów (Ivano-Frankivsk) in 1934. At age thirteen he became inspired to become a research virologist, hearing about the work of Professor Rudolf Weigl in Lwow (Lviv) from his older brother, who was Weigl’s student at the Medical School. Weigl worked on Rickettsia prowazekii and by inoculating lice and maintaining them on volunteers, he had developed a vaccine against epidemic typhus.

In 1938, Maramorosch received his Agricultural Engineer degree from the Warsaw Agricultural University (SGGW). In 1939, after the Nazi invasion of Poland, Maramorosch and his wife fled to Romania, where both were interned in Polish refugee camps for the following four years. After the Soviet army liberated Romania Maramorosch continued his graduate studies at the Bucharest Polytechnic, choosing plant pathology as his major.

== Career ==
In 1947, age 32 years, he and his wife emigrated via Czechoslovakia, France and Sweden to the United States. Maramorosch entered Columbia University while working as a technician at the Brooklyn Botanical Garden. In 1949, he obtained his doctoral degree (Ph.D.).

=== Mechanical transmission of viruses and phytoplasmas to insect vectors ===
Maramorosch's scientific career began at the Brooklyn Botanic Garden. From 1949-60 he was a faculty member at the Rockefeller University in New York. He modified Weigl’s procedure of lice inoculation, adopting it to micro-injection of plant pathogenic viruses and phytoplasmas into leafhopper vectors. This permitted him to obtain the first evidence that certain plant pathogens multiply not only in plants, but also in specific invertebrate animal vectors.

=== Invertebrate cell culture ===
Since 1956, when Maramorosch first cultured insect cells for use in the study of viruses, he had been an active contributor to the field of invertebrate pathology and to the study of plant and animal viruses, viroids and phytoplasmas. His research in invertebrate tissue cultures laid a foundation for the uses of invertebrate-based in vitro expression systems, as these support post-translational modification unlike prokaryotic cell cultures. These systems are used in applications that range from basic research to industrial use, and in fields that range from agriculture to medicine, pharmaceutical drug discovery, and mammalian cell gene delivery. As of 1996, the Mitsuhashi-Maramorosch insect culture medium for culturing insect cells was a widely used standard medium.

=== Basic and applied research and teaching ( 1960-1980s) ===
In 1960 Maramorosch worked for six months as consultant for the Food and Agriculture Organization of the United Nations (FAO) in the Philippines where he studied the devastating cadang-cadang coconut palm disease. From 1961 until 1973, he was Program Director of Virology at the Boyce Thompson Institute in Yonkers, New York. He and his postdoctoral associates used electron microscopy to detect and characterize viruses and phytoplasmas in cells of diseased plants and insect vectors. In 1974 Maramorosch accepted the invitation from the Board of Governors of Rutgers, The State University of New Jersey, to join the faculty at the Waksman Institute of Microbiology as tenured Distinguished Professor. In 1983, he was nominated the Robert L. Starkey Professor of Microbiology.

In 1980, Maramorosch was awarded the Wolf Prize in Agriculture, often called the Agriculture Nobel Prize, for his work on interactions between insect vectors and plant pathogens. Numerous further awards followed, including the Jurzykowski Foundation Award, the AIBS Award, and two Fulbright awards.

Maramorosch traveled extensively to lecture and teach as visiting professor in Argentina, Armenia, China, Egypt, Germany, India, Israel, Japan, Kenya, Mexico, Netherlands, Nigeria, Poland, Russia, Sri Lanka, Uzbekistan and Yugoslavia. His major research interests include comparative virology, invertebrate cell culture, parasitology, emerging diseases caused by viroids, viruses, phytoplasmas and spiroplasmas, biotechnology, and international scientific cooperation.

== Personal life and death ==
Maramorosch was married to Warsaw-born wife Irene Ludwinowska. Irene became a librarian in the New York Public Library, where she worked for the following 30 years. They had one daughter, Lydia Ann Trammell Maramorosch, born 1949 in New York.

Maramorosch died of natural cause at the age of 101 years in Poland while visiting family.

== Editorial work ==
Maramorosch continued, through 2015, to be active in the field by conducting research, publishing, presenting his findings at professional meetings, and organizing international conferences to promote new advances in the field. In his career of over 60 years, Maramorosch published as author or co-author more than 800 scientific papers and 100 books. A partial list follows:

1. Biological Transmission of Disease Agents, 1962.
2. Comparative Symptomatology of Coconut Diseases of Unknown Etiology, 1964.
3. Insect Viruses, 1968.
4. Viruses, Vectors, and Vegetation, 1969.
5. Comparative Virology, 1971.
6. Mycoplasma Diseases, 1973.
7. Viruses, Evolution, and Cancer, 1974.
8. Invertebrate Immunity, 1975.
9. Legume Diseases in the Tropics, 1975.
10. Invertebrate Tissue Culture-Research Application, 1976.
11. Aphids as Virus Vector, 1977.
12. Insect and Plant Viruses-An Atlas, 1977.
13. Viruses and Environment, 1978.
14. Invertebrate Tissue Culture - Applications in Medicine, Biology and Agriculture, 1979.
15. Practical Tissue Culture Applications, 1979.
16. Leafhopper Vectors of Plant Disease Agents, 1979.
17. Vectors of Plant Pathogens, 1980.
18. Invertebrate Systems in Vitro, 1980.
19. Vectors of Disease Agents, 1981.
20. Mycoplasma Diseases of Trees and Shrubs, 1981.
21. Mycoplasma and Allied Pathogens of Plants, Animals and Humans, 1981.
22. Plant Diseases and Vectors-Ecology and Epidemiology, 1981.
23. Invertebrate Cell Culture Applications, 1982.
24. Pathogens, Vectors and Plant Diseases- Approaches to Control, 1982.
25. Subviral Pathogens of Plants and Animals, 1985.
26. Viral Insecticides for Biological Control, 1985.
27. Biotechnology Advances in Insect Pathology and Cell Culture, 1987.
28. Mycoplasma diseases of Crops, 1988.
29. Invertebrate and Fish Tissue Culture, 1988.
30. Biotechnology for Biological Control of Pests and Vectors, 1991.
31. Viroids and Satellites-Molecular Parasites at the Frontier of Life, 1991.
32. Plant Diseases of Uncertain Etiology, 1992.
33. Insect Cell Biotechnology, 1994.
34. Arthropod Cell culture Systems, 1994.
35. Forest Trees and Palms- Diseases and Control, 1996.
36. Invertebrate Cell Culture-Novel Directions and Biotechnology Applications, 1997.
37. Invertebrate Cell Culture- Looking Toward the XXI Century, 1997.
38. Biotechnology and Plant Protection in Forestry, 1998.
39. Maintenance of Human, Animal and Plant Pathogen Vectors, 1999.

40-48. Methods in Virology, 8 vols. 1967–1984.
49-56. Advances in Cell Culture, 7 vols., 1981-1989.
57-215. Advances in Virus Research, 56 vols. 1973-2015.

== Awards and honors ==
- 1959: AAAS Award
- 1962: Co-organized the first international conference on invertebrate tissue culture in Montpellier, France
- 1962: Vice President and Recording secretary, New York Academy of Sciences
- 1963: U.S. Delegate, 1st International Committee for Virus Nomenclature
- 1967-1984: Founder and editor, with Hilary Koprowski, Methods in Virology,8 vols. Academic Press
- 1970: Elected Member, Leopoldina Academy, Germany
- 1972: Fulbright Dist. Professor, Yugoslavia
- 1972–present, editor (vols.16-81), Advances in Virus Research
- 1974–present: Distinguished Professor, Rutgers University, (currently Emeritus Professor)
- 1976: Ciba-Geigy Award in Agriculture
- 1978: ASM Waksman Award
- 1983: Distinguished Service Award of American Institute of Biological Sciences (AIBS)
- 1984–present: Robert L. Starkey Professor of Microbiology
- 1974: Honorary Fellow, Indian National Academy of Science (currently Emeritus Professor)
- 1978: Fulbright Dist. Professor. Yugoslavia
- 1980: Wolf Prize in Agriculture,(Studies of interactions between insects and plant pathogens)
- 1981: Jurzykowski Foundation Award in Biology (for exemplary research achievements and pioneering contributions to the field of insect cell culture)
- 1981-1989: Founder and editor, Advances in Cell Culture, 8 vols. Academic Press
- 1982: Distinguished Vis. Professor, Fudan University, Shanghai
- 1987: Honorary Fellow, Indian Virological Society
- 1990: Founder’s Lecturer, Society for Invertebrate Pathology
- 1998: Founder’s honoree, Society for Invertebrate Pathology
- 1998: Honorary Member, Entomological Society of America
- 2001: Distinguished Lifetime Achievement Award, Society for In Vitro Biology
- 2006: L.O. Howard Dist. Achievement Award, ESA.
- 2010: M.V. Nayudu's Life Time Achievement Award in VIROCON-2010 at Sri Venkateswara University, Tirupati, India on 18 March 2010.
- 2011: Inaugural lecturer, 2nd Intern. Phytoplasmology Workshop, Neustadt, Germany
- 2011: Diagmol Symposium Honoree, University of Life Sciences, Warsaw, Poland
- 2011: Plenary speaker, Pi-Net Conference, Corvinus University, Budapest, Hungary

== Sources ==
- Chet, Ilan, ed. (2009). Wolf Prize in Agriculture. World Scientific Publishing. ISBN 978-981-283-584-0.
