= Zygmunt Aleksander Wnęk =

Polish soldier and military officer

- Wnęk
- Born: Zygmunt; July 17, 1918; Kołomyja Galicia, Austria-Hungary
- Died: August 15, 1944; Jort, Normandy France
- Other name: Aleksander
- Military career
- Allegiance: Poland
- Service years: to 1944
- Rank: Second lieutenant commanding officer / Patrol leader
- Unit: Polish 1st Armored Division
- Conflicts: World War II: Battle of France; Invasion of Normandy; Falaise pocket
- Awards: Virtuti Militari V class (Silver Cross); Cross of Valour

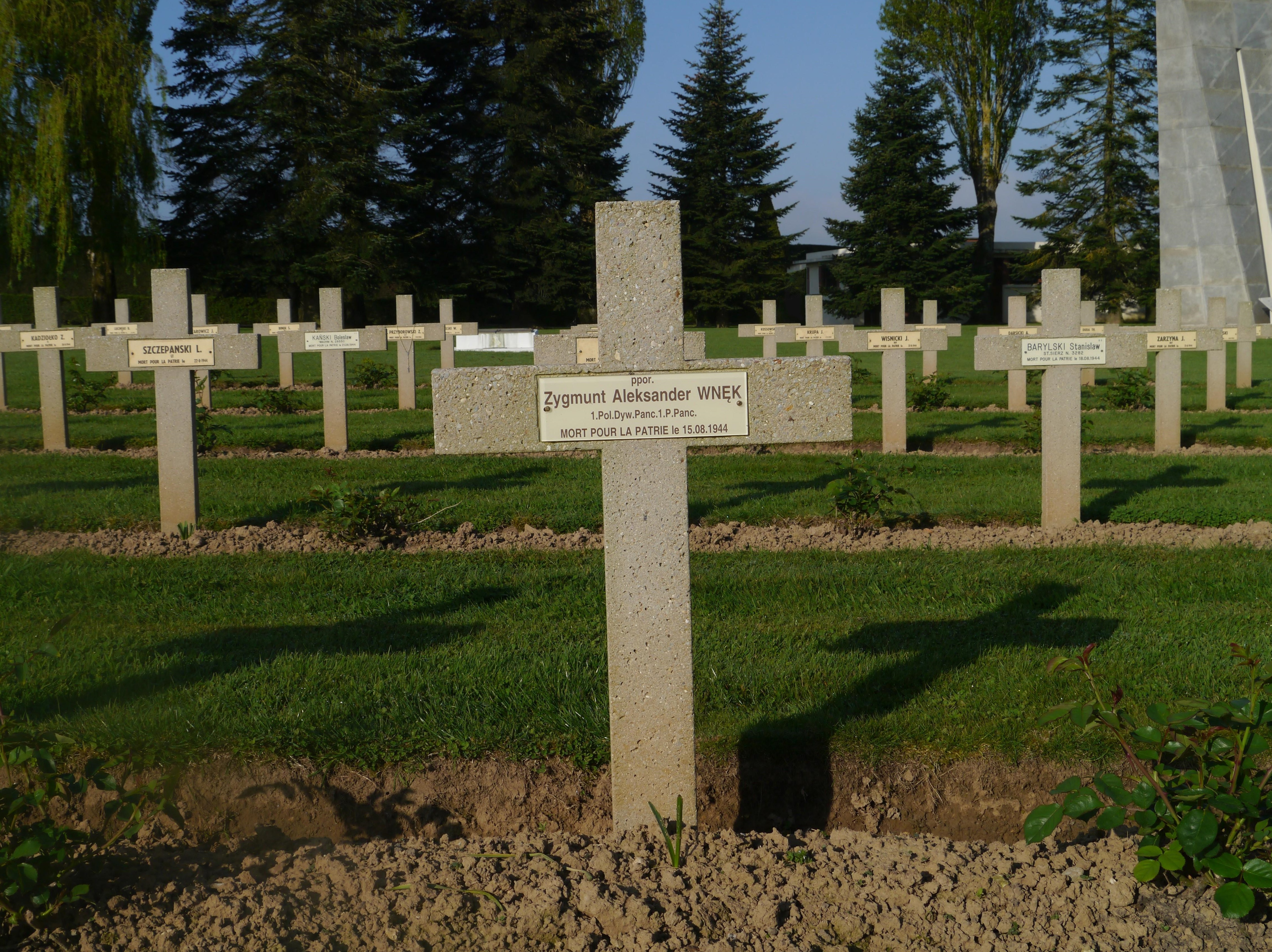
Zygmunt Aleksander Wnęk

Zygmunt Aleksander Wnęk (1918–1944) was a Polish soldier and military officer. During World War II he served in the rank of 2nd Lieutenant (podporucznik) on the Western Front with the 1st Armoured Regiment of the 1st Armoured Division. Killed in action during the Battle of Falaise, he was posthumously awarded the Silver Cross of Virtuti Militari, Poland's highest military decoration.

== Biography ==
Zygmunt Aleksander Wnęk was born 17 July 1918 in Kołomyja, then a city in Austro-Hungarian Galicia. His father, Piotr Wnęk, held the position of Commisar in the State Police and as an active participant in the Polish Legions in World War I was awarded Cross of Defence of Lwów and Honorary Award "Eaglets of Lwów". Zygmunt Wnęk graduated from the State Secondary School in Kołomyja, named "Król Kazimierz Jagiellończyk". Early on in his education he pursued an active role in developing sports culture in Poland. He was awarded the State Certificate in Sport, becoming team leader of the Polish Gymnastics Society "Sokół" in Kołomyja.

Following the advance of the Russian Army into Poland in August 1939, he departed from Poland ending up in France. In 1940 he took part in the French Campaign during which he distinguished himself with his bravery and courage. His commanding officer, Major Roman Proszek, considered him an officer of high military expertise and great courage. On 27 August 1943 Zygmunt Wnęk was awarded the Cross of Valour. Following the occupation of France, Zygmunt Wnęk found himself in the Polish 1st Armored Division formed in February 1942, under General Stanislaw Maczek in Duns, Scotland.

Zygmunt Wnęk was patrol leader in the Reconnaissance Platoon of the 1st Armoured Regiment (Poland). During the Battle for Falaise on 15-August 1944, Zygmunt Wnęk died whilst undertaking action across the river Dives between Jort and Vandeuvre, on the left flank of the Polish First Armoured Division.

He is buried in the Polish War Cemetery Langannerie in Normandy and was posthumously awarded the Virtuti Militari V class (Silver Cross).

== Bibliography ==
- Evan McGilvray: "Man of Steel and Honour: General Stanislaw Maczek: Soldier of Poland, Commander of the 1st Polish Armoured Division in North-West Europe 1944-45" Published by Helion & Company 2012 Helion Studies in Military History No.18
- Evan McGilvray: "The Black Devils March - A Doomed Odyssey. The 1st Polish Armoured Division 1939-1945" Published by Helion & Company; 1st edition 2004
- John Keegan: „Six Armies in Normandy, from D-Day to the liberation of Paris”. Published by Penguin Books 1983
- Krzysztof Barbarski and Terry Hadler: "Polish Armour 1939-45 (Vanguard 30)". Published by Ospray Publishing 1982
- http://www.polishwargraves.nl/langri/2615.htm
- http://www.landmarkscout.com/the-only-polish-cemetery-in-france-near-grainville-langgannerie-urville/
- Database of War graves http://www.memoiredeshommes.sga.defense.gouv.fr/fr/arkotheque/client/mdh/sepultures_guerre/detail_fiche.php?ref=1955224&debut=0

== Honours and awards ==
- Silver Cross of the Order of Virtuti Militari (Poland)
- Cross of Valour (Poland)
