= Kolomyia urban hromada =

Urban hromada in Ivano-Frankivsk Oblast, Ukraine

Kolomyia urban hromada Коломийська міська громада
- Hromada
- Seal
- Interactive map of Kolomyia urban hromada
- Country: Ukraine
- Oblast: Ivano-Frankivsk
- Raion: Kolomyia

Area
  - Total: 182.5 km^{2} (70.5 sq mi)

Population (2023)
  - Total: 74,497
  - Density: 408.2/km^{2} (1,057/sq mi)
- Settlements: 11
- Cities: 1
- Villages: 10
- Website: kolrada.gov.ua

Kolomyia urban territorial hromada (Ukrainian: Коломийська міська територіальна громада, romanized: Kolomyiska miska terytorialna hromada) is a hromada of Ukraine, located in the western Ivano-Frankivsk Oblast. Its administrative centre is the city of Kolomyia.

The hromada has an area of 182.5 km^{2} (70.5 mi^{2}). It also has a population of 74,497 (as of 2023).

Prior to the 2020 administrative reforms in Ukraine, Kolomyia urban hromada existed as a amalgamated hromada, including seven settlements. That amalgamated hromada, established on 5 October 2018, had an area of 136.77 km^{2} (52.81 mi^{2}).

== Settlements ==
In addition to one city (Kolomyia) (Note: Part of Kolomyia urban amalgamated territorial hromada before 2020.), there are ten villages within the hromada:

- Voskresyntsi
- Hrushiv
- Ivanivtsi
- Kornych
- Korolivka
- Kubayivka
- Rakivchyk
- Sadzhavka
- Tovmachyk
- Sheparivtsi
