= Kolomyia =

City in Ivano-Frankivsk Oblast, Ukraine

Kolomyia Коломия
- City
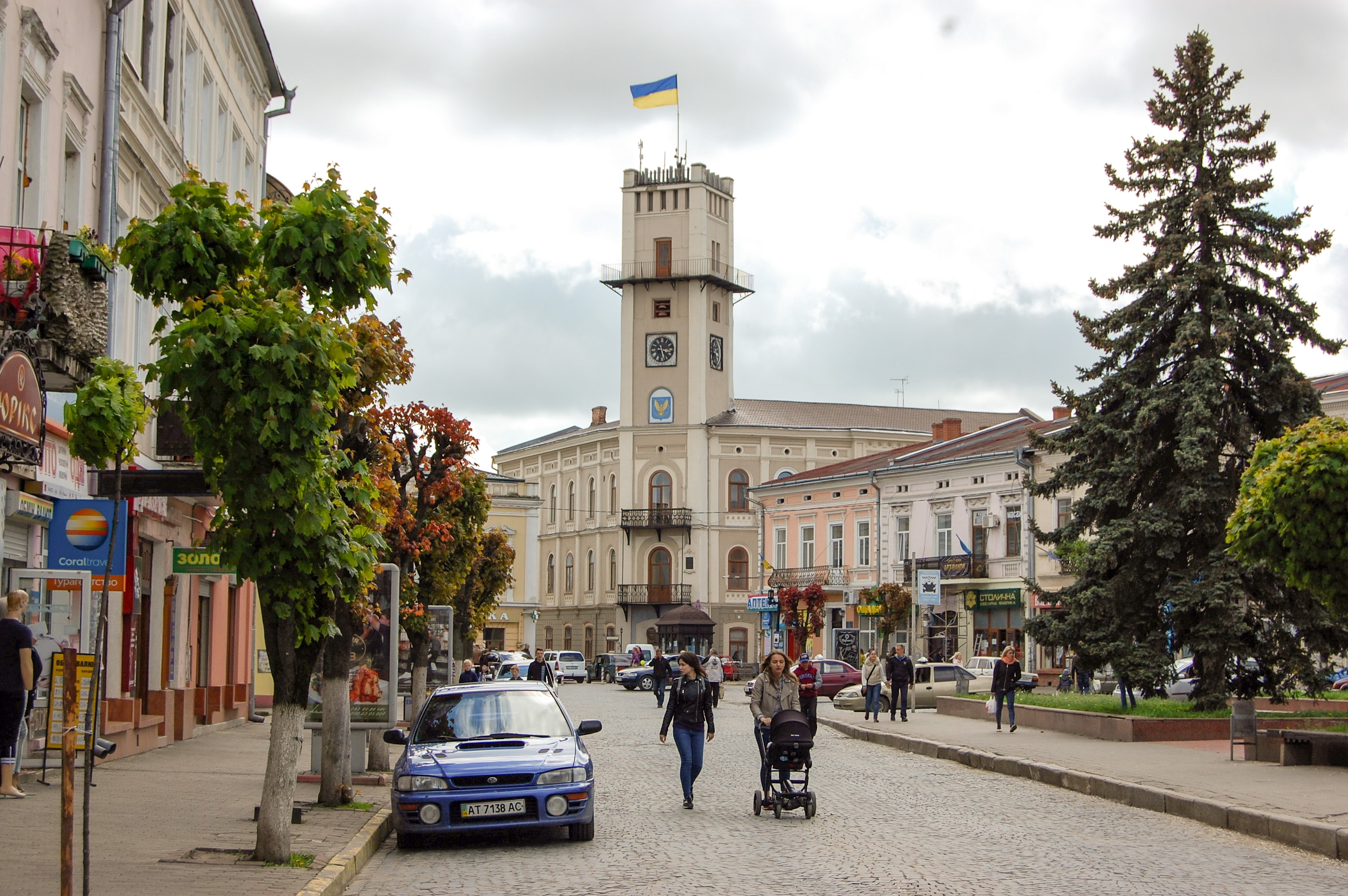
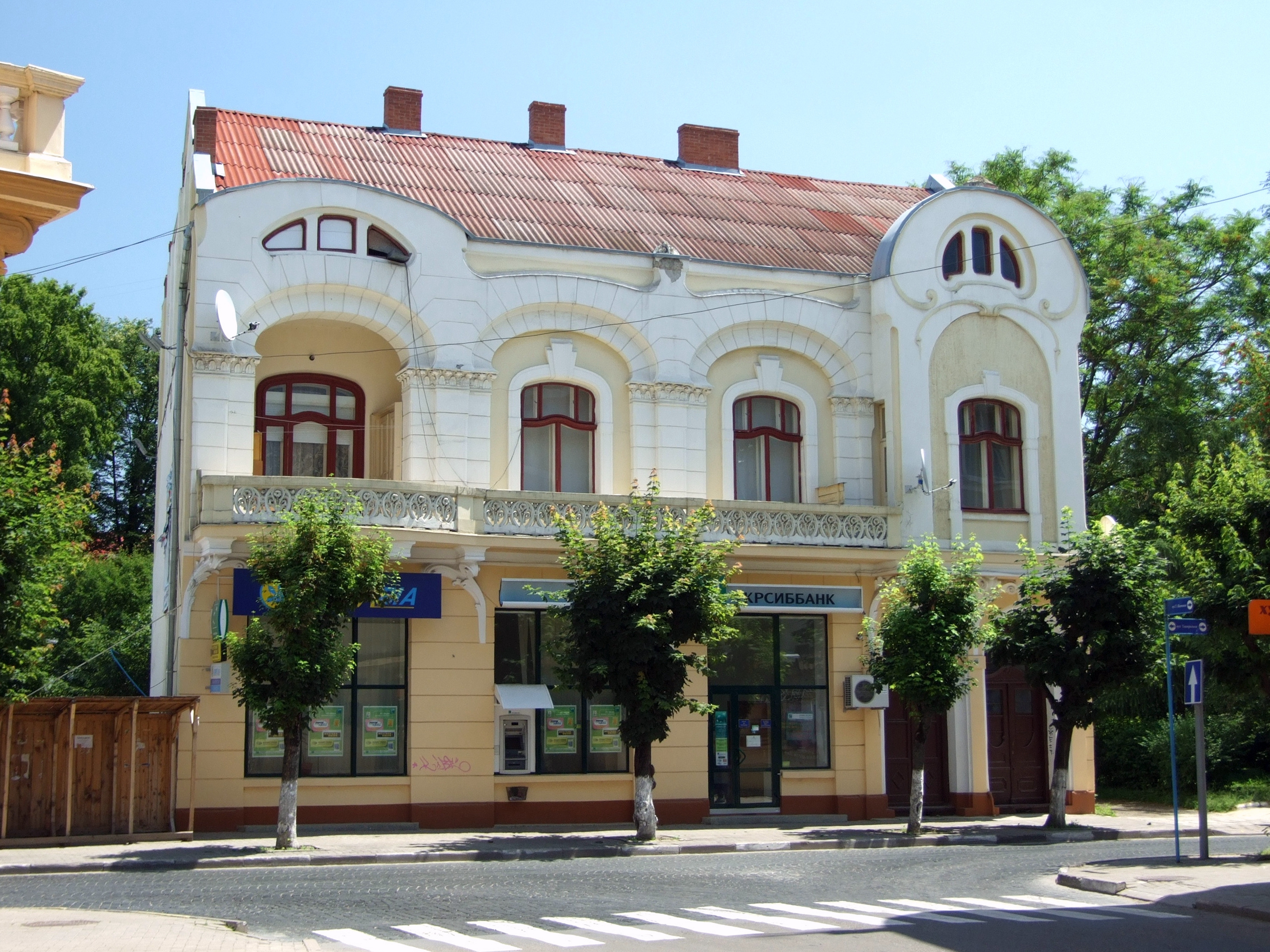
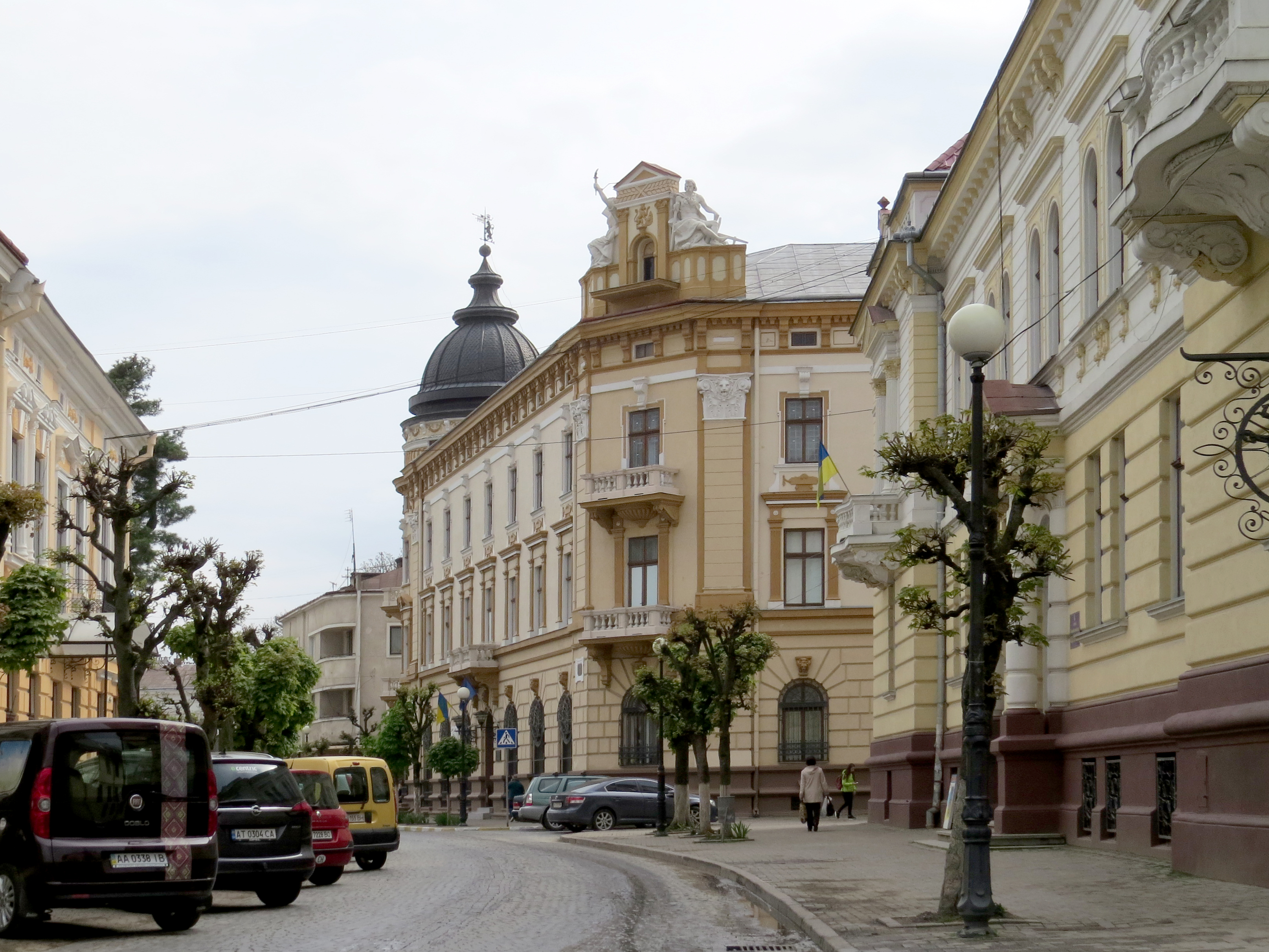
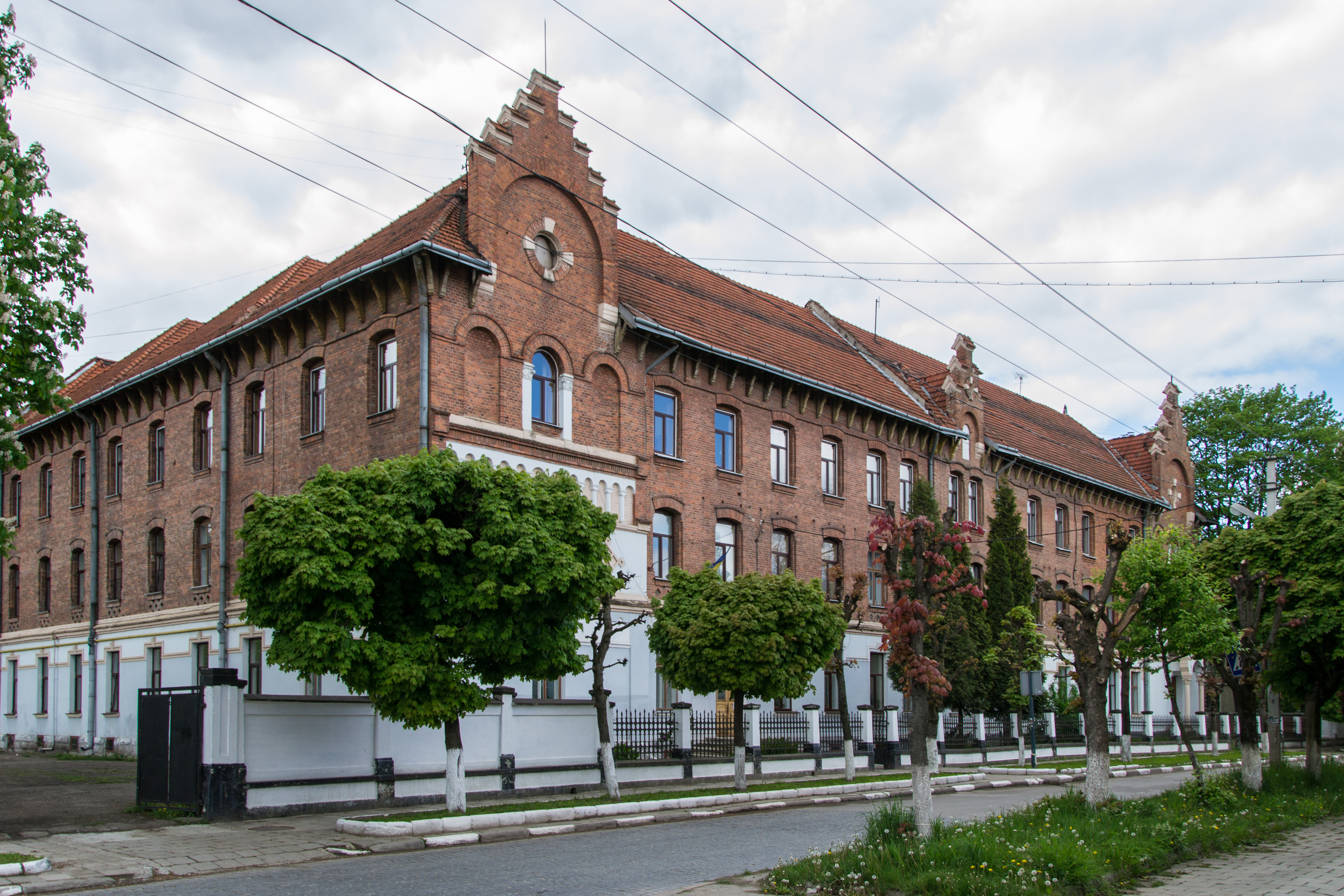
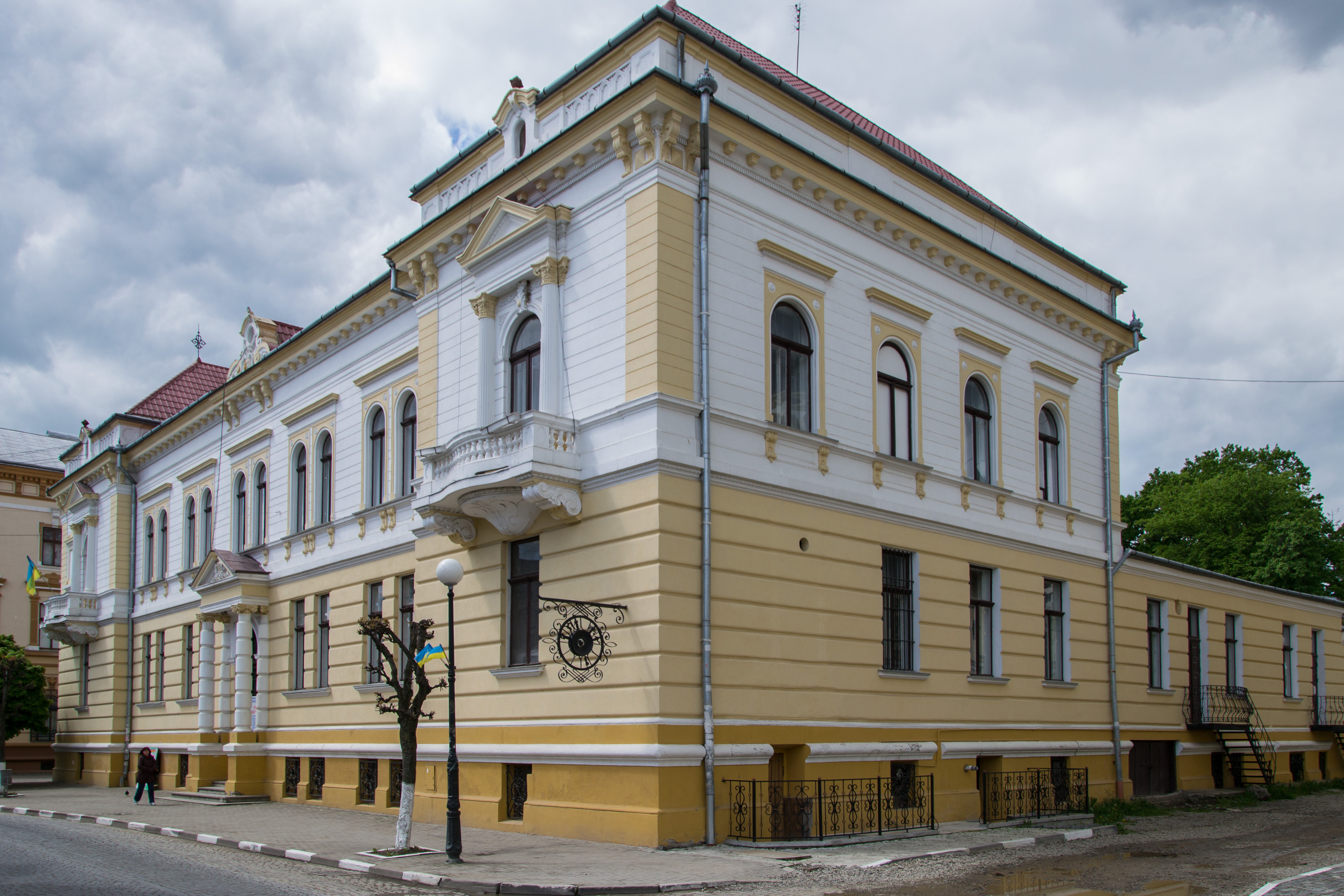
- Clockwise from top: Town Hall; House at Teatralna Street, 25; Savings Bank Building; Monastery of Ursulines; House at Teatralna Street, 36

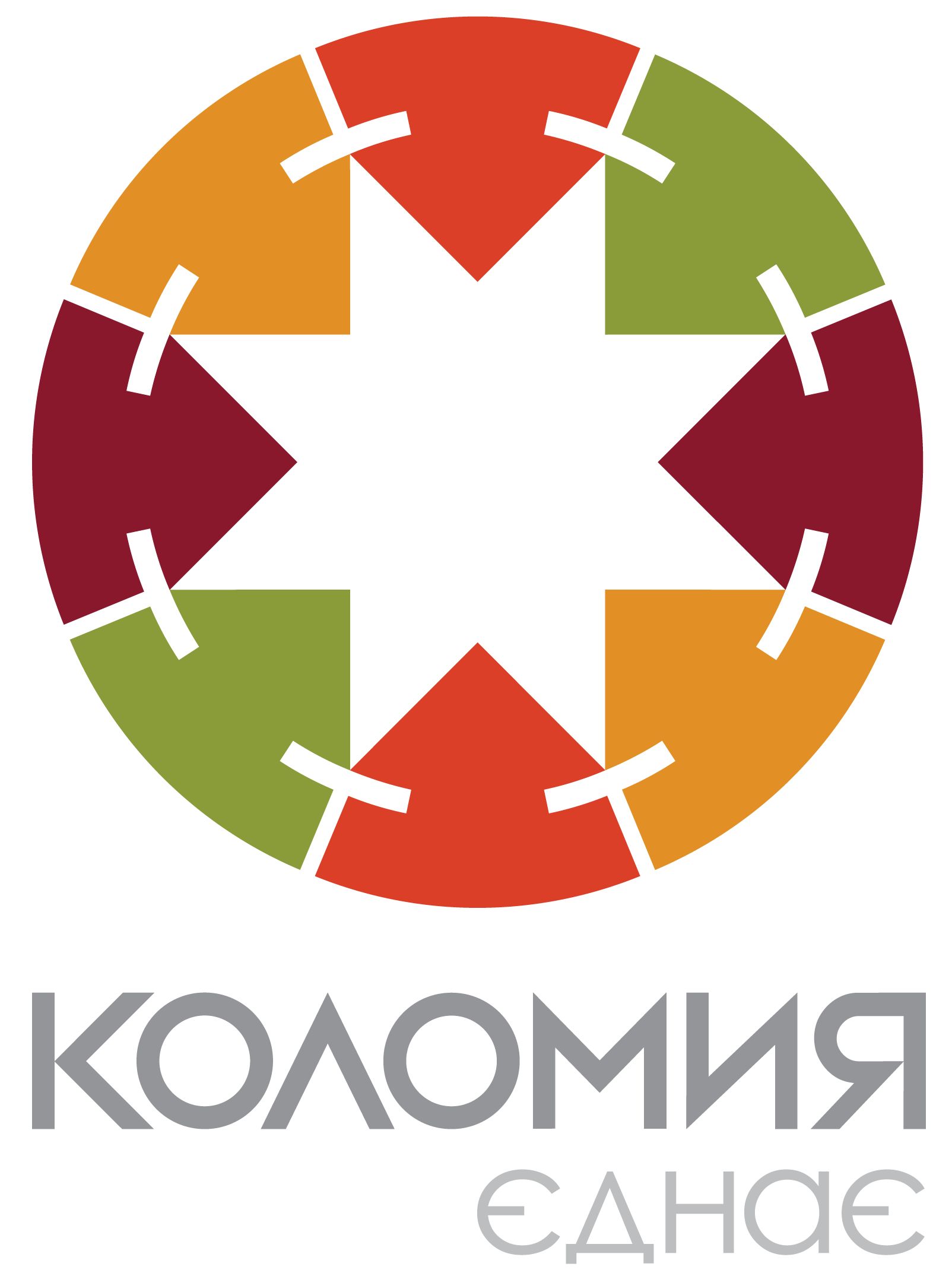
- Flag Coat of arms Brandmark

- Location of Kolomyia Kolomyia (Ukraine)
- Coordinates: 48°31′50″N 25°02′25″E
- Country: Ukraine
- Oblast: Ivano-Frankivsk Oblast
- Raion: Kolomyia Raion
- Hromada: Kolomyia urban hromada
- Established: 1240

Area
  - Total: 41 km^{2} (16 sq mi)

Population (2022)
  - Total: 60,821
  - Density: 1,494/km^{2} (3,870/sq mi)
- Website: www.ko.if.ua City's administrative statistics at Verkhovna Rada web-site

Kolomyia (Ukrainian: Коломия, IPA: [koloˈmɪjɐ]; Polish: Kołomyja), formerly known as Kolomea, is a city located on the Prut River in Ivano-Frankivsk Oblast in the west of Ukraine. It serves as the administrative centre of Kolomyia Raion, hosting the administration of Kolomyia urban hromada. The population is 60,821 (2022 estimate).

The city rests approximately halfway between Ivano-Frankivsk and Chernivtsi, in the centre of the historical region of Pokuttia, with which it shares much of its history. Kolomyia is a notable railroad hub, as well as an industrial centre (textiles, shoes, metallurgical plant, machine works, wood and paper industry). It is a centre of Hutsul culture. Until 1925 Kolomyia was the most populous town in the region. Before the Holocaust about half the town's population was Jewish.

== Etymology ==
The city has alternative names for it in other languages:

- Polish: Kołomyja;
- German: Kolomea;
- Romanian: Colomeea;
- Yiddish: קאָלאָמיי, romanized: Kolomey.

According to Ukrainian etymological dictionaries, the name Kolomyia is a compound word formed from the roots of the noun kolo 'wheel, circle' and the verb myti 'to wash'. It comes from the Proto-Slavic word kołomyja 'hole filled with water' (literally, 'that which the wheel washes').

== History ==
The settlement of Kolomyia was first mentioned by the Hypatian Chronicle in 1240 and the Galician–Volhynian Chronicle in 1241 a time of the Mongol invasion of Rus'. Initially part of Kievan Rus', it later belonged to one of its successor states, the principality of Halych-Volhynia. On the order of Boroldai, the town fortress was burnt down in 1259. Since the mid-13th century it was known for its salt mining industry.

=== Under Poland (1340–1498) ===
Old coat of arms of Kolomyia

In 1340 it was annexed to Poland by King Casimir III following the Galicia–Volhynia Wars, along with the rest of the Kingdom of Rus'. Sometime in the 1340s, another fortress was erected there. In a short time the settlement became one of the most notable centres of commerce in the area. Because of that, the population rose rapidly.

Prior to 1353 there were two parishes in the settlement, one for Catholics and the other for Orthodox. In 1388 the king Władysław Jagiełło was forced by the war with the Teutonic Order to pawn the area of Pokuttia to the hospodar of Moldavia, Petru II. Although the town remained under Polish sovereignty, the income of the customs offices in the area was given to the Moldavians, after which time the debt was repaid. In 1412 the king erected a Dominican order monastery and a stone-built church there.

=== Development ===
In 1405 the town's town rights were confirmed and it was granted with the Magdeburg Law, which allowed the burghers limited self-governance. This move made the development of the area faster and Kołomyja, as it was called then, attracted many settlers from many parts of Europe. Apart from the local Ukrainians and Poles, many Armenians, Jews, and Hungarians settled there. In 1411 the fortress-town was given away for 25 years to the Vlach Hospodar Olexander as a gift for his support in the war against Hungary. In 1443, a year before his death, King Wladislaus II of Poland granted the town yet another privilege which allowed the burghers to trade salt, one of the most precious minerals of the Middle Ages.

Since the castle gradually fell into disarray, in 1448 King Casimir IV of Poland gave the castle on the hill above the town to Maria, widow of Prince Iliaș of Moldavia as a dowry. In exchange, she refurbished the castle and reinforced it. In 1456 the town was granted yet another privilege. This time the king allowed the town authorities to stop all merchants passing by the town, and force them to sell their goods at the local market. This gave the town an additional boost, especially as the region was one of three salt-producing areas in Poland (the other two being Wieliczka and Bochnia), both not far from Kraków.

The area was relatively peaceful for the next century. However, the vacuum after the decline of the Golden Horde started to be filled by yet another power in the area: the Ottoman Empire. In 1485 Sultan Beyazid II captured Belgorod and Kilia, two ports on the northern shores of the Black Sea. This became a direct threat to Moldavia. In search of allies, its ruler Stephen the Great came to Kolomyia and paid homage to the Polish king, thus becoming a vassal of the Polish Crown. For the ceremony, both monarchs came with roughly 20,000 knights, which was probably the biggest festivity ever held in the town. After the festivity most knights returned home, apart from 3,000 under Jan Karnkowski, who were given to the Moldavian prince as support in his battles, which he won in the end.

In 1490, due to increased oppression of Ukrainians at the hands of the Polish, a series of successful rebellions was led by modern Ukrainian hero Petro Mukha, joined by other Ukrainians, such as Cossacks and Hutsuls, in addition to Moldavians (Romanians). Known as Mukha's Rebellion, this series of battles was supported by the Moldavian prince Stephen the Great, and it is one of the earliest known uprisings of Ukrainians against Polish oppression. Besides Kolomyia, these rebellions saw the capture of other cities of Pokuttia, and reached as far west as Lviv, but without capturing the latter.

=== Decline ===
With the death of Stephen the Great of Moldavia, the neighbouring state started to experience both internal and external pressure from the Turks. As a consequence of border skirmishes, as well as natural disasters, the town was struck by fires in 1502, 1505, 1513, and 1520.

==== Under Moldavia (1498–1531) ====
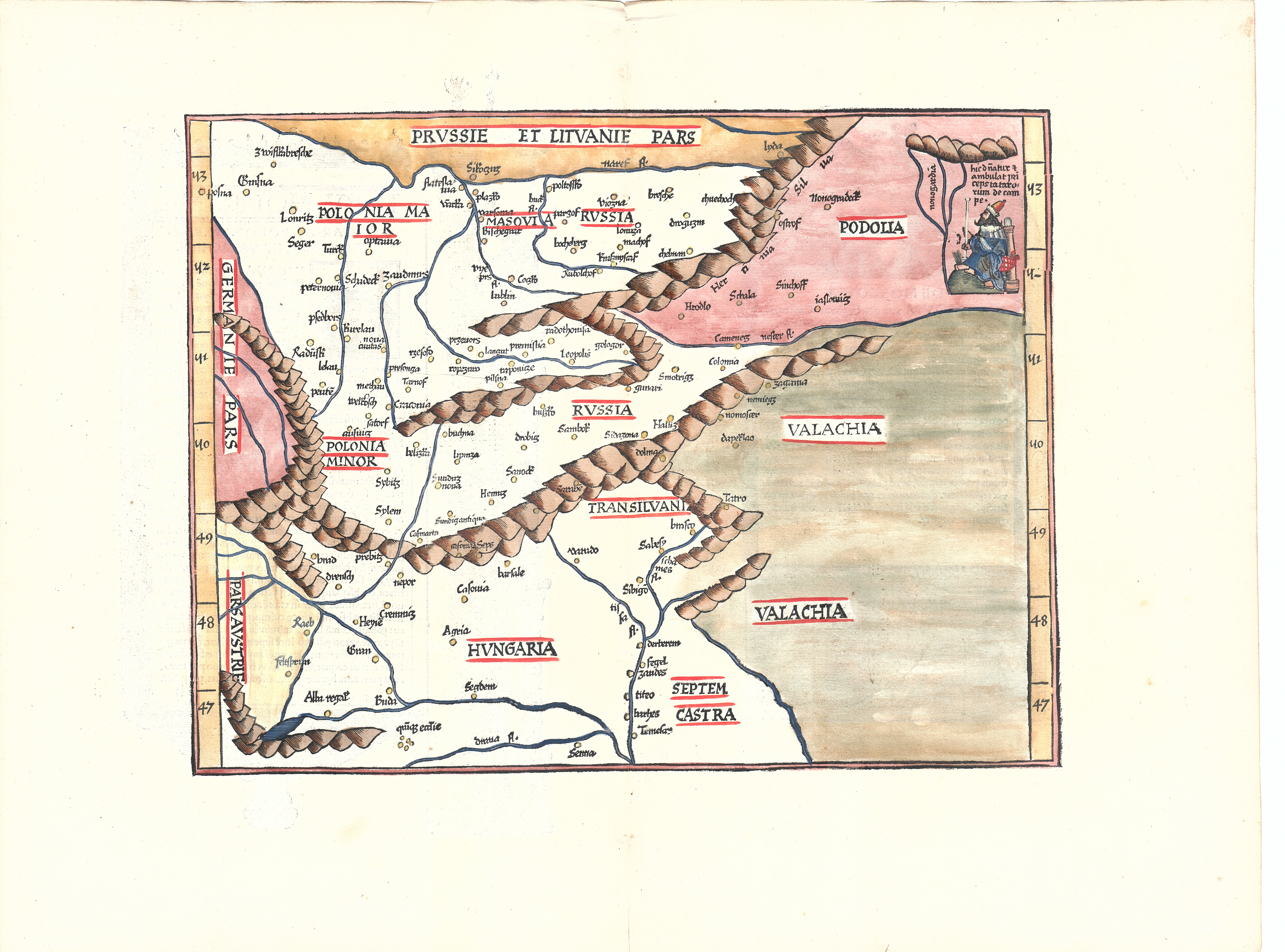
Kolomyia (Colomia) on a 1525 map of Poland, Hungary and Ruthenia

Władysław II Jagiełło, needing financial support in his battles against the Teutonic Knights, used the region as a guarantee in a loan which he obtained from Petru II of Moldavia, who thus gained control of Pokuttia in 1388. Therefore, it became the feudal property of the princes of Moldavia, but remained within the Kingdom of Poland.

After the Battle of the Cosmin Forest, in 1498, Pokuttia was conquered by Stephen the Great, annexed and retained by Moldavia until the Battle of Obertyn in 1531, when it was recaptured by Poland's hetman Jan Tarnowski, who defeated Stephen's son Petru Rareș. Minor Polish-Moldavian clashes for Pokuttia continued for the next 15 years, until Petru Rareș's death.

==== Polish–Ottoman wars ====
The following year, hetman Jan Tarnowski recaptured the town and defeated the Moldavians in the Battle of Obertyn. This victory secured the city's existence for the following years, but the Ottoman power grew and Poland's southern border remained insecure.

In 1589, the Turks crossed the border and seized Kolomyia almost immediately. All the burghers who had taken part in the defence were slaughtered, while the rest were forced to pay high indemnities.

The town was returned to Poland soon afterwards, but the city's growth lost its momentum.

In 1620, another Polono-Turkish war broke out. After the Polish defeat at Țuțora, Kolomyia was yet again seized by the Turks. In 1626 the town was burned to the ground, while all of residents were enslaved in a jasyr.

After the war the area yet again returned to Poland. With the town in ruins, the starosta of Kamieniec Podolski fortress financed its reconstruction – slightly further away from the Prut River. The town was rebuilt, but never regained its power and remained one of many similar-scaled centres in the area.

==== Khmelnytskyi Uprising ====
During the Khmelnytskyi Uprising in 1648–54, the Kolomyia county became a centre of a peasant unrest (Pokuttia Uprising) led by Semen Vysochan. The rebels' centre was a town of Otynia. With the help of incoming Cossack forces, Vysochan managed to overtake the important local fortress of Pniv (today – a village of Nadvirna Raion) and eventually managed to take under its control most of cities and villages in the region providing great support for the advancing Cossack forces of Bohdan Khmelnytskyi. Soon however with advancing Polish troops, Vysochan was forced to retreat to the eastern Podillya where he continued to fight under commands of Ivan Bohun and Ivan Sirko.

In the 18th century the town`s outskirts saw another peasant rebellion led by Oleksa Dovbush. The rebels were known as opryshky.

=== Austrian rule ===
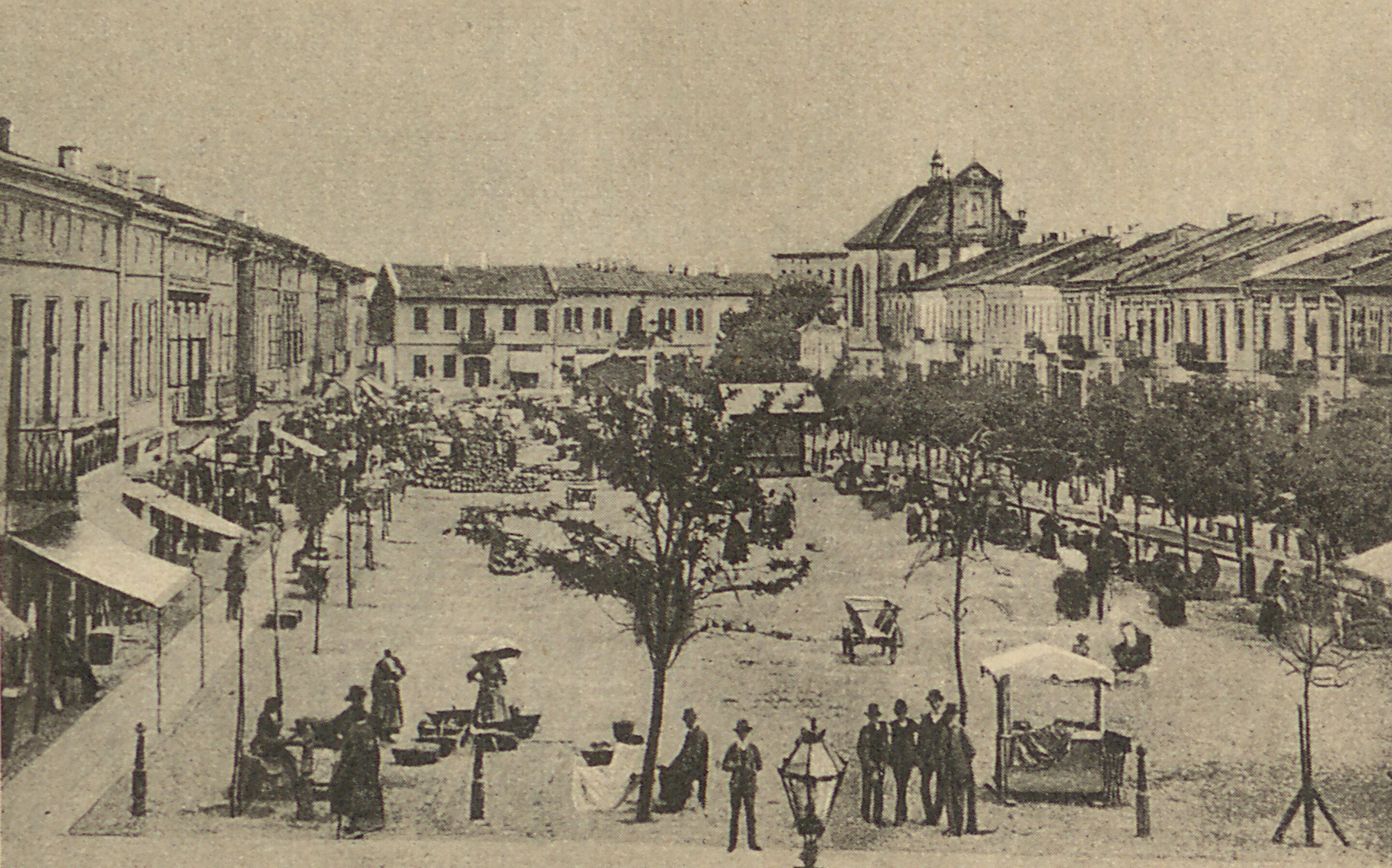
Kolomyia during the late 19th century

As a result of the first of Partitions of Poland (Treaty of St. Petersburg dated 5 July 1772), Kolomyia was attributed to the Habsburg monarchy. More details about the history of Galicia can be read in the article Kingdom of Galicia and Lodomeria.

However, as it provided very little profit, Kolomyia was sold to the castellan of Bełz, Ewaryst Kuropatnicki, who became the town's owner. The magnate financed a new Our Lady's Church, but he lacked the financial means to accelerate the town`s growth.

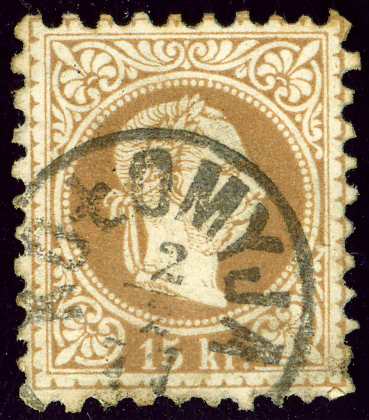
Austrian stamp cancelled in 1871 (Kingdom of Galicia and Lodomeria)

Prosperity returned to the town in the mid-19th century, when it was linked to the world through the Lemberg-Czernowitz railroad. In 1848 in Kolomyia was built a public library which was one of the first in eastern Galicia. In 1861 there was opened a gymnasium where studied among others Petro Kozlaniuk, Vasyl Stefanyk, Marko Cheremshyna. By 1882 the town had almost 24,000 inhabitants, including roughly 12,000 Jews, 6,000 Ruthenians (Ukrainians), and 4,000 Poles. Until the end of that century, commerce attracted even more inhabitants from all over Galicia. There were established publishers and print houses. Moreover, a new Jesuit Catholic church was built in Kolomyia, as it was called by German authorities, along with a Lutheran church built in 1874. By 1901 the number of inhabitants grew to 34,188, approximately half of them Jews.

In 1893 a Ukrainian gymnasium was established in Kolomyia, becoming the third oldest establishment of that type after gymnasiums in Lviv and Przemyśl.

=== Early 20th century ===
Great Synagogue of Kolomyia before 1906

In 1900 the Jewish population was 16,568, again nearly 50% of the town's population. The Jewish community had a Great Synagogue, and about 30 other synagogues. In 1910 Jews were prohibited from selling alcoholic beverages. In 1911 they were prohibited from salt and wine occupations.

During the early 1900s Kolomyia served as one of the most important centres of Ukrainian culture, and was the second largest centre of Ukrainian publishing after Lviv. Sich sporting society organised by Kyrylo Trylyovsky spread its activities in the city, aligned with the Ukrainian radical movement. A branch of Mykola Lysenko Musical Institute was established in Kolomyia during that period.

After the outbreak of World War I, the town saw fierce battles between the forces of the Russian Empire and Austria-Hungary. Jews were abused for supposedly supporting the Austrians, and many Jewish homes were ransacked and destroyed. The Russian advance occupied the town in September 1914. In 1915 the Austrians retook the town.

As a result of the collapse of Austria-Hungary, both the town itself and the surrounding region became disputed between renascent Poland and the West Ukrainian People's Republic.

=== Second Polish Republic ===
During the Polish–Ukrainian War of 1919, Kolomyia was seized without a fight by the Romanian Land Forces under General Iacob Zadik, and handed over to Polish authorities. According to the Ukrainian Soviet Encyclopedia, it was taken over by the Polish bourgeoisie and land owners. During the Polish–Bolshevik 1919 war in Ukraine, a Polish division under General Zeligowski tore through Bessarabia and Bukovina and stopped in Kolomyia during its winter march to Poland. Kolomyia was then temporarily occupied by the Romanians and the border was near the town (shtetl) Otynia between Stanislav and Kolomyia.

View of a street in Kolomyia in 1938

After the Polish–Soviet War it remained in Poland as a capital of a powiat within the Stanisławów Voivodship. By 1931 the number of inhabitants grew to over 41,000. The ethnic mixture was composed of Jews, Poles, Ukrainians (including Hutsuls), Germans, Armenians, and Hungarians, as well as of descendants of Valachians and other nationalities of former Austria-Hungary. With the development of infrastructure, the town became a major railroad hub, as well as the garrison village of the 49th Hutsul Rifle Regiment. In the interbellum period, every Thursday a market took place at the main square of the town. The town had a monument to Polish poet Franciszek Karpinski, a monument to Polish poet Adam Mickiewicz, and an obelisk near the town, located in a spot where in 1485 hospodar Stephen III of Moldavia paid tribute to king Kazimierz IV Jagiellon. In the 1920–1930s, workers' strikes took place in the village, possibly organized by the Communist Party of Western Ukraine that was established in Kolomyia in 1923.

In 1921 a music school was established in Kolomyia.

=== World War II ===
==== Soviet annexation ====
Polish Army officers during a military ceremony in Kolomyia, 1939

After the outbreak of World War II with the invasion of Poland of 1939, the town was thought of as one of the centres of Polish defence of the so-called Romanian Bridgehead. However, the Soviet invasion from the east made these plans obsolete, and the town was occupied by the Red Army.

As a result of the Molotov–Ribbentrop Pact, the occupied town became a part of the Soviet Union as a region of the Ukrainian SSR. The accession of the Western Ukraine to the Soviet Union (Reunion of Western Ukraine and USSR) – the adoption of the Soviet Union in Western Ukraine with the adoption of an Extraordinary Session V of the Supreme Soviet of the USSR Law "On the inclusion of the Western Ukraine in the Soviet Union to the reunification of the Ukrainian SSR" (1 November 1939) at the request of the Commission of the Plenipotentiary of the People's Assembly of Western Ukraine. The decision to file motions stipulated in the Declaration "On joining of Western Ukraine in the Ukrainian Soviet Socialist Republic" was adopted by the People's Assembly of Western Ukraine in Lviv, 27 October 1939.

On 14 November 1939, the Third Extraordinary Session of the Supreme Soviet of USSR decided: "Accept Western Ukraine in the Ukrainian Soviet Socialist Republic, and thus reunite the great Ukrainian people in a unified Ukrainian state."

In 1940 part of the local population, Jews and Christians alike, were arrested by the NKVD, and sent to the Gulag system or to various Soviet prisons that contained Poles, Jews, Ukrainians, Hungarians, and many others.

==== German occupation ====
In June 1941, the town was bombed by Nazi Germany airforce. This caused many Jews and young people to flee east. Briefly, the town was occupied by Hungary, a German ally. During their occupation, the Ukrainian townspeople launched a pogrom against Jews, beating, robbing, and humiliating them. Several hundred were forced to remove Lenin's statue from the town square. Ukrainians were preparing to shoot many when a deputy mayor stopped them. The Ukrainians prepared lists of Jews they wanted to see punished.

On 1 August the town became part of the German controlled Generalgouvernement and the anti Jewish measures increased. In October, the Germans and their Ukrainian auxiliaries arrested 3000 Jews according to the lists prepared by the Ukrainians. These Jews were taken by truck to the Szeparowce Forest where they were shot. The Great Synagogue in the town was burned. The next month, 2000 more were taken to the same forest by the Germans and their Ukrainian allies and shot and in December another 1200 suffered the same fate. More Aktions followed in January though March 1942 so that the Jewish population of the town, which had been 30,000 before June was now only 17,000. At this point, the Germans established a ghetto forcing Jews to move there within 24 hours. In April 5000 Jews were rounded up and sent to Belzec, where they were immediately murdered. In September 1942, more than 1000 Jews were selected to stay in the ghetto, being fit to work. Those in hiding were shot, and others sent to Belzec to be murdered. Jews from surrounding villages were brought to the ghetto and they too, with more Kolomyia Jews, were sent to Belzec. In February 1943, the last Jews, who had been kept behind as laborers were killed by clubbing and shooting. Overall, more than 70,000 Jews from Kolomyia and the area were killed in Kolomyja and the Szeparowce Forest or sent to Belzec.

Only about 200 Jews were still alive when the Red Army liberated Kolomyia from the German invaders on 28 March 1944. Other Jews who had been deported or fled to the Soviet Union survived there. After liberation, many construction workers, teachers, doctors, engineers and other skilled professionals began to arrive to restore the ruined town. They arrived from the eastern part of Ukraine and other parts of the Soviet Union. But the Jewish community was not revived.

=== Modern times ===
During the Cold War Kolomyia was the headquarters of the 44th Rocket Division of the Strategic Rocket Forces, which had previously been the 73rd Engineer Brigade RVGK at Kamyshin. The division was disbanded on 31 March 1990.

==== Under independent Ukraine (1991–present) ====
Kolomyia city hall

Since 1991 Kolomyia has been part of independent Ukraine.

By the time of independence the vast majority of industrial enterprises of Kolomyia had closed or had been eliminated: Plant "Kolomyiasilmash", "Zahotzerno", plant "Elektroosnastka", factory "17 September", a shoe factory, a woodworking factory, plant KRP (complete switchgears), the printing house on Valova St., a brush manufacturer, a weaving factory and many others. Also shut down were movie theatres; there had been four: Irchan movie theatre, Kirov movie theatre, movie theatre "Yunist" (Youth), and a summer theatre in the present Trylovskoho park (formerly named Kirov park). A film store of regional importance also closed down. As a result, many people found themselves unemployed, and many town residents felt forced to move abroad to find work. Those companies that have remained from the Soviet era barely function. These include a curtain factory, a paper mill, Metalozavod, Plant PRUT (programmable electronic educational terminals), a cheese factory, "Kolomyiasilmash", Kolomyia Plant management of building materials, Kolomyia Motor Company, a paper mill, a clothes factory on Valova St, a printing house on Mazepa St., and a canned fruit plant.

Most of these companies were widely known in the former Soviet Union and abroad, as they were highly advanced in terms of equipment, skilled workers, and engineering staff. These enterprises produced many products, with people working in several shifts, and providing the village with received significant tax revenues.

Kolomyia's sister town is Nysa in Poland, to which many of its former inhabitants had to move after the war.

Since late 2015, Kolomyia has been the headquarters of the Ukrainian 10th Mountain Brigade.

Until 18 July 2020, Kolomyia was incorporated as a town of oblast significance and served as the administrative center of Kolomyia Raion though it did not belong to the raion. In July 2020, as part of the administrative reform of Ukraine, which reduced the number of raions of Ivano-Frankivsk Oblast to six, the town of Kolomyia was merged into Kolomyia Raion.

== Population ==
Historical population
| Year | Pop. | ±% |
|---|---|---|
| 1880 | 23,100 | — |
| 1900 | 34,200 | +48.1% |
| 1910 | 42,700 | +24.9% |
| 1931 | 33,400 | −21.8% |
| 1943 | 18,500 | −44.6% |
| 1956 | 34,000 | +83.8% |
| 2001 | 61,448 | +80.7% |
| 2022 | 60,821 | −1.0% |

=== Ethnic groups ===
Distribution of the population by ethnicity according to the 2001 census:

Ethnic groups in Kolomyia
| | percent |
| Ukrainians | 92.35% |
| Russians | 5.01% |
| Poles | 0.49% |
| Belarusians | 0.29% |
| Moldovans | 0.10% |
| Jews | 0.08% |
| Tatars | 0.04% |
| others | 1.64% |

=== Language ===
Distribution of the population by native language according to the 2001 census:

| Language | Number | Percentage |
|---|---|---|
| Ukrainian | 57,214 | 93.11% |
| Russian | 3,075 | 5.00% |
| Other or undecided | 1,159 | 1.89% |
| Total | 61,448 | 100.00% |

== Economy and transport ==
Kolomyia railway station

Kolomyia is an important railway junction, serving as a centre of light industry, wood processing, food production, machine building and construction industry.

=== Major enterprises ===
- Kolomyiasilmash
- Factory of the 17 September
- Factory of construction materials
- Factory combine of household services

== Education and culture ==
Pysanka Museum

Kolomyia houses a number of technical, medical and pedagogical schools.

=== Points of interest ===
- Museum of the History of Kolomyia
- National Museum of Hutsulshchyna and Pokuttia Folk Art (established in 1926)
- Kolomyia is famous for its Pysanka Museum, which was built in 2000
- Church of the Annunciation of the Blessed Virgin Mary (1709)
- Academic Regional Ukrainian Drama Theater named after Ivan Ozarkevych

== Geography ==
=== Location ===
Regional orientation

=== Climate ===
Climate data for Kolomyia (1981–2010)
| Month | Jan | Feb | Mar | Apr | May | Jun | Jul | Aug | Sep | Oct | Nov | Dec | Year |
|---|---|---|---|---|---|---|---|---|---|---|---|---|---|
| Mean daily maximum °C (°F) | 0.5 (32.9) | 2.0 (35.6) | 7.1 (44.8) | 14.1 (57.4) | 20.0 (68.0) | 22.6 (72.7) | 24.7 (76.5) | 24.2 (75.6) | 19.2 (66.6) | 13.8 (56.8) | 6.3 (43.3) | 1.2 (34.2) | 13.0 (55.4) |
| Daily mean °C (°F) | −3.5 (25.7) | −2.4 (27.7) | 2.0 (35.6) | 8.2 (46.8) | 13.7 (56.7) | 16.7 (62.1) | 18.6 (65.5) | 17.8 (64.0) | 13.1 (55.6) | 7.9 (46.2) | 2.1 (35.8) | −2.5 (27.5) | 7.6 (45.7) |
| Mean daily minimum °C (°F) | −7.7 (18.1) | −6.4 (20.5) | −2.4 (27.7) | 2.8 (37.0) | 7.6 (45.7) | 11.0 (51.8) | 12.9 (55.2) | 12.0 (53.6) | 7.7 (45.9) | 3.2 (37.8) | −1.5 (29.3) | −6.0 (21.2) | 2.8 (37.0) |
| Average precipitation mm (inches) | 26.8 (1.06) | 28.8 (1.13) | 37.3 (1.47) | 54.2 (2.13) | 78.3 (3.08) | 109.2 (4.30) | 104.6 (4.12) | 86.2 (3.39) | 64.1 (2.52) | 42.7 (1.68) | 34.2 (1.35) | 34.2 (1.35) | 700.6 (27.58) |
| Average precipitation days (≥ 1.0 mm) | 6.8 | 7.2 | 7.8 | 8.9 | 10.7 | 12.1 | 11.0 | 10.6 | 8.5 | 7.6 | 7.5 | 8.2 | 106.9 |
| Average relative humidity (%) | 82.2 | 80.9 | 77.6 | 72.3 | 73.0 | 76.0 | 75.8 | 78.0 | 80.3 | 81.6 | 84.9 | 85.4 | 79.0 |
Source: World Meteorological Organization

== Twin towns – sister cities ==
Kolomyia is twinned with:

- Drochia, Moldova
- Gniewino, Poland
- Kratovo, North Macedonia
- Łapsze Niżne, Poland
- Łomża, Poland
- Nysa, Poland
- Rădăuți, Romania
- Sighetu Marmației, Romania

== Notable people ==
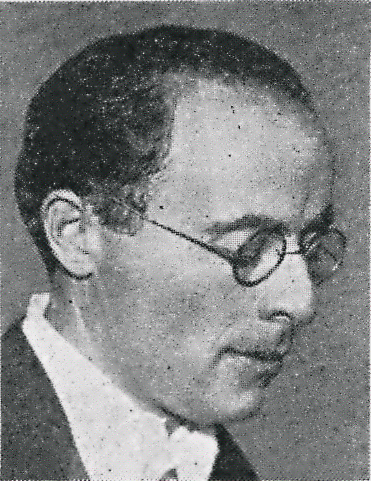
Emanuel Feuermann

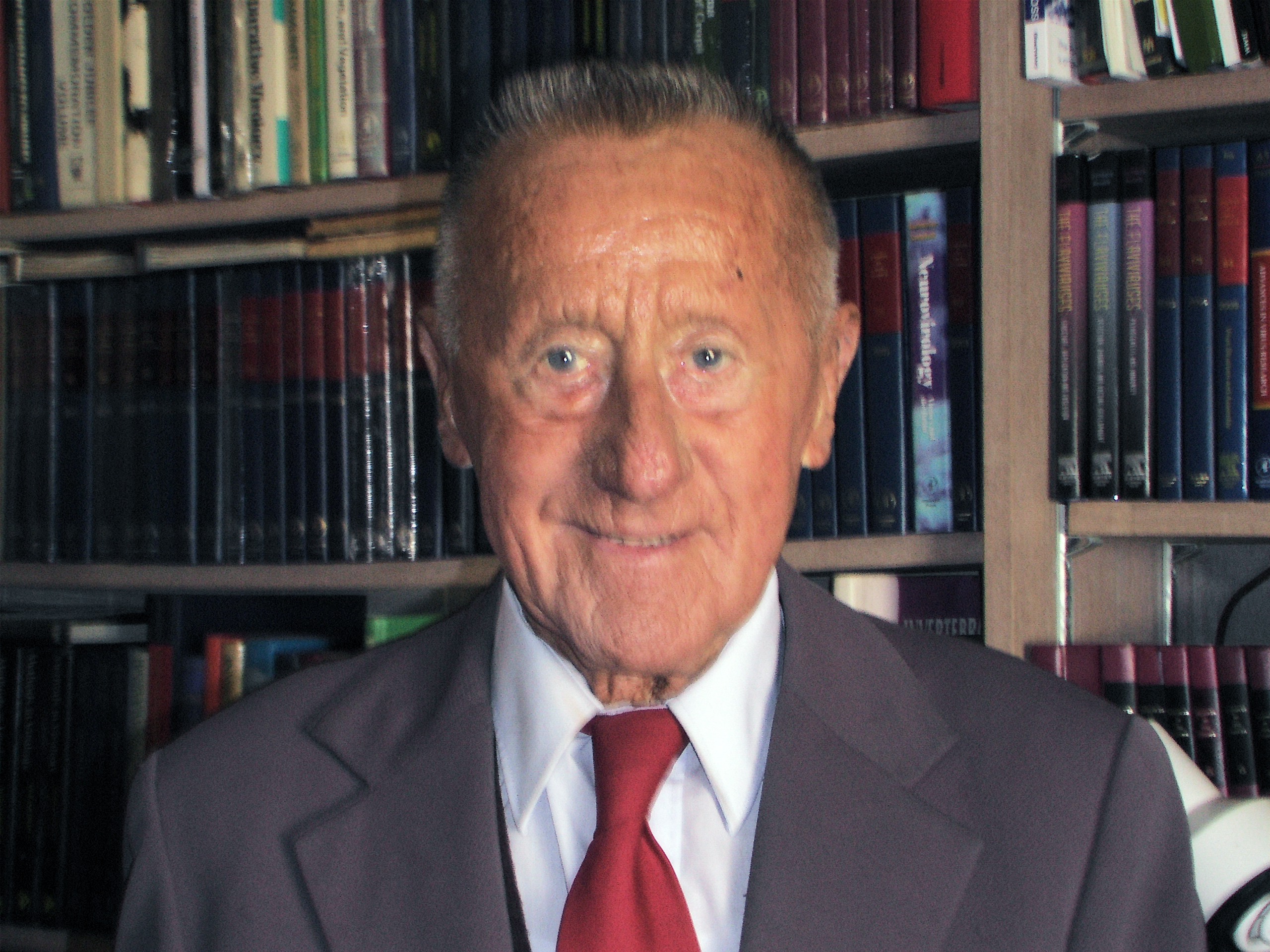
Karl Maramorosch

- Julia Angeliuk (born 1997), Ukrainian painter, volunteer and entrepreneur
- Edmund Bergler (1899–1962), Austrian-born American psychoanalyst
- Artem Chapeye (born 1981), Ukrainian writer
- Emanuel Feuermann (1902–1942), American-Jewish cellist
- Adolf Frisch (1891–1943), a Jewish doctor of medicine and political activist
- Chaim Gross (1902–1991), American-Jewish sculptor and educator
- Sviatoslav Hordynskyi (1906–1993), Ukrainian poet, translator, literary critic, artist, and art historian
- Maria Horowitz (1892–1942), Polish-Jewish female entrepreneur, co-founder of the curtain factory and philanthropist
- Roman Hryhorchuk (born 1965), Ukrainian football player and manager
- Antonina Hulles (1872–1942), Polish-Jewish community activist and philanthropist
- Myroslav Irchan (1897–1937), Ukrainian playwright
- Olena Iurkovska (born 1983), Ukrainian athlete, five-time Paralympic Champion and Hero of Ukraine
- Mieczyslaw Jagielski (1924–1997), Polish politician and economist
- Franciszek Karpinski (1741–1825), Polish 17th century poet
- Myroslava Kocherzhuk (born 1963), Ukrainian local historician and research associate of historical museum of Kolomyia
- Marek Lachs (1878–1943), lawyer, head of the local Zionist organization, a member of the Zionist Party Council in Lviv, and a deputy of the Kolomyia City Council
- Hillel Lichtenstein (1814–1891), Hungarian Jewish rabbi
- Karl Maramorosch (1915–2016), Austrian-born American virologist, entomologist, and plant pathologist
- Stefan Witold Matejko (1871–1935), Polish painter and stained-glass designer
- Dov Noy (1920–2013), Israeli folklorist, recipient of the Israel Prize in 2004
- Jakiw Palij (1923–2019), Trawniki concentration camp guard who was the last known Nazi to have lived in the United States
- Ivan Proshak (1922–1999), member of the Ukrainian Insurgent Army and a victim of Nazis (1941–1943) and Soviet (1945–1957) camps
- Stanislaw Ruziewicz (1889–1941), Polish mathematician
- Denys Sahaliuk (born 2002), Ukrainian freestyle wrestler
- Józef Sandel (1894–1962), Polish-Jewish art historian and critic, art dealer, and collector
- Dmytro Stankevych (1891–1942) Ukrainian doctor of medicine (radiologist) and political activist
- Edward Stenzel (1846–1910) Polish pharmacist, businessperson and cavalier of the state title "Aptekarski radcy cesarski" (1898)
- Stefan Stenzel (1884–1942), Polish pharmacist and businessperson
- Zygmunt Aleksander Wnęk (1918–1944), Polish military officer
- Olesya Stefanko (born 1988), Ukrainian pageant, finished 1st runner-up at the 2011 Miss Universe pageant (Ukraine's highest placement to date)
- Andrzej Zalucki (born 1941), Polish diplomat

== Gallery ==
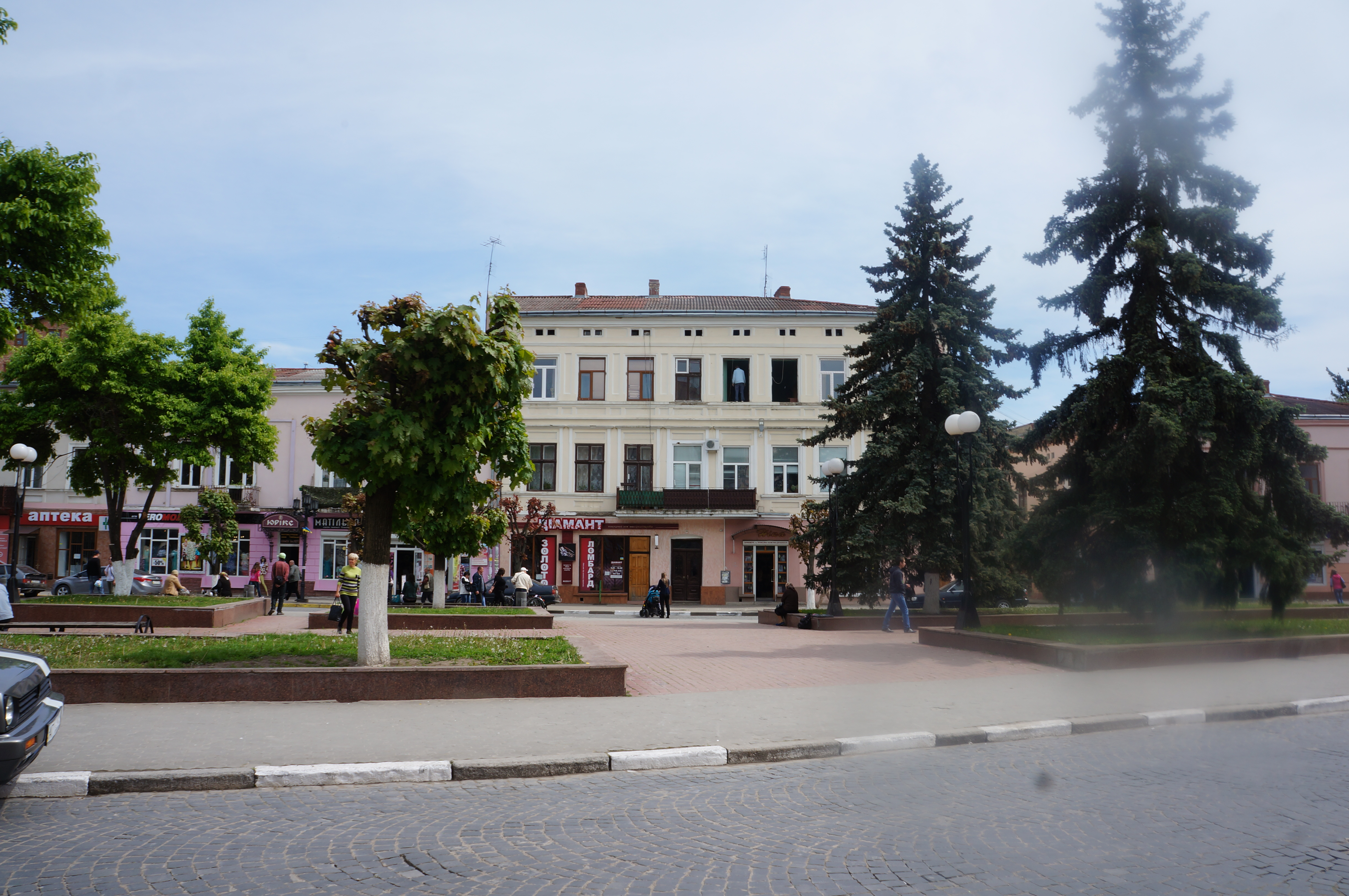
2 Market Square in Kolomyia

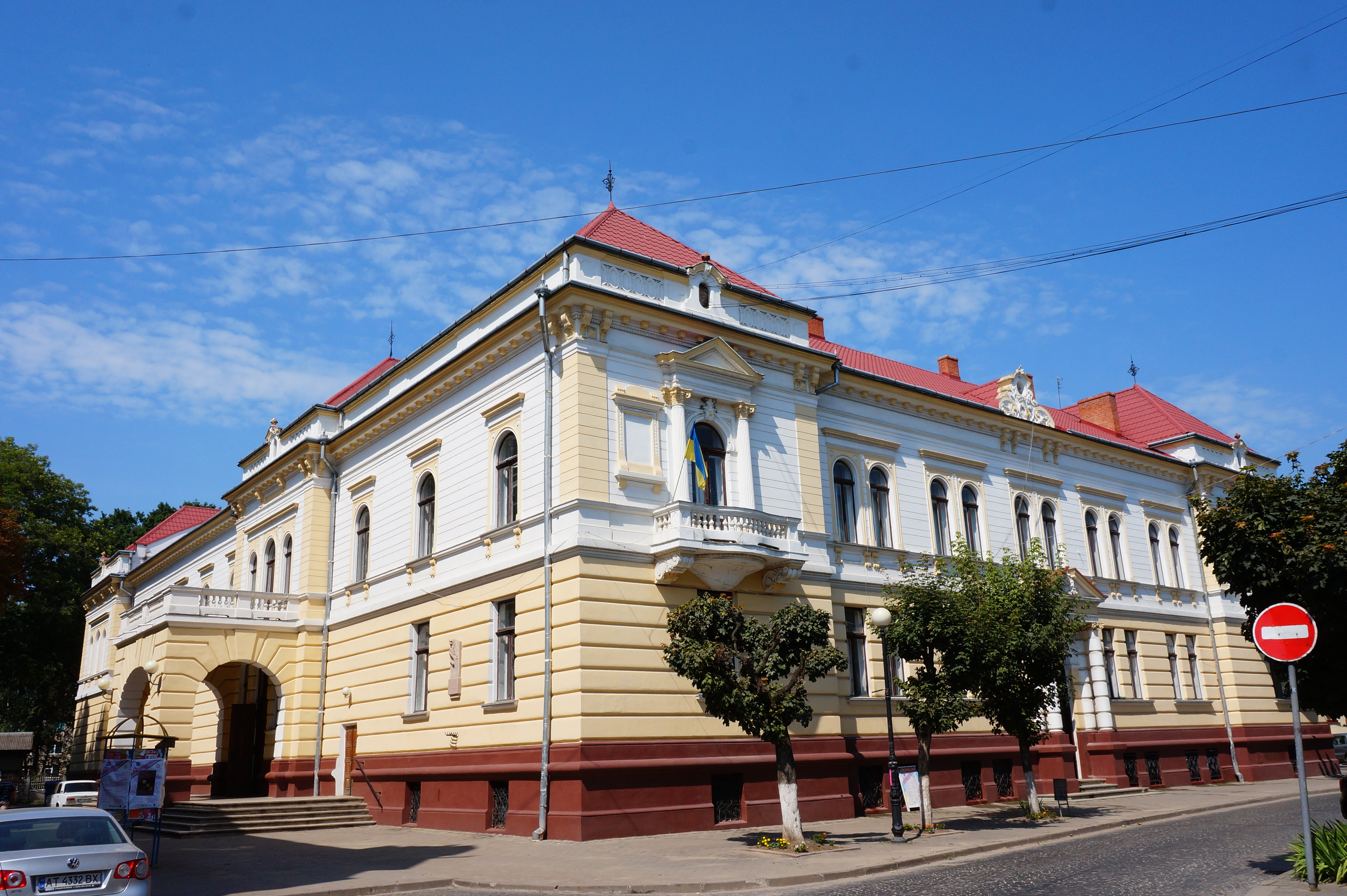
Central part of Kolomyia

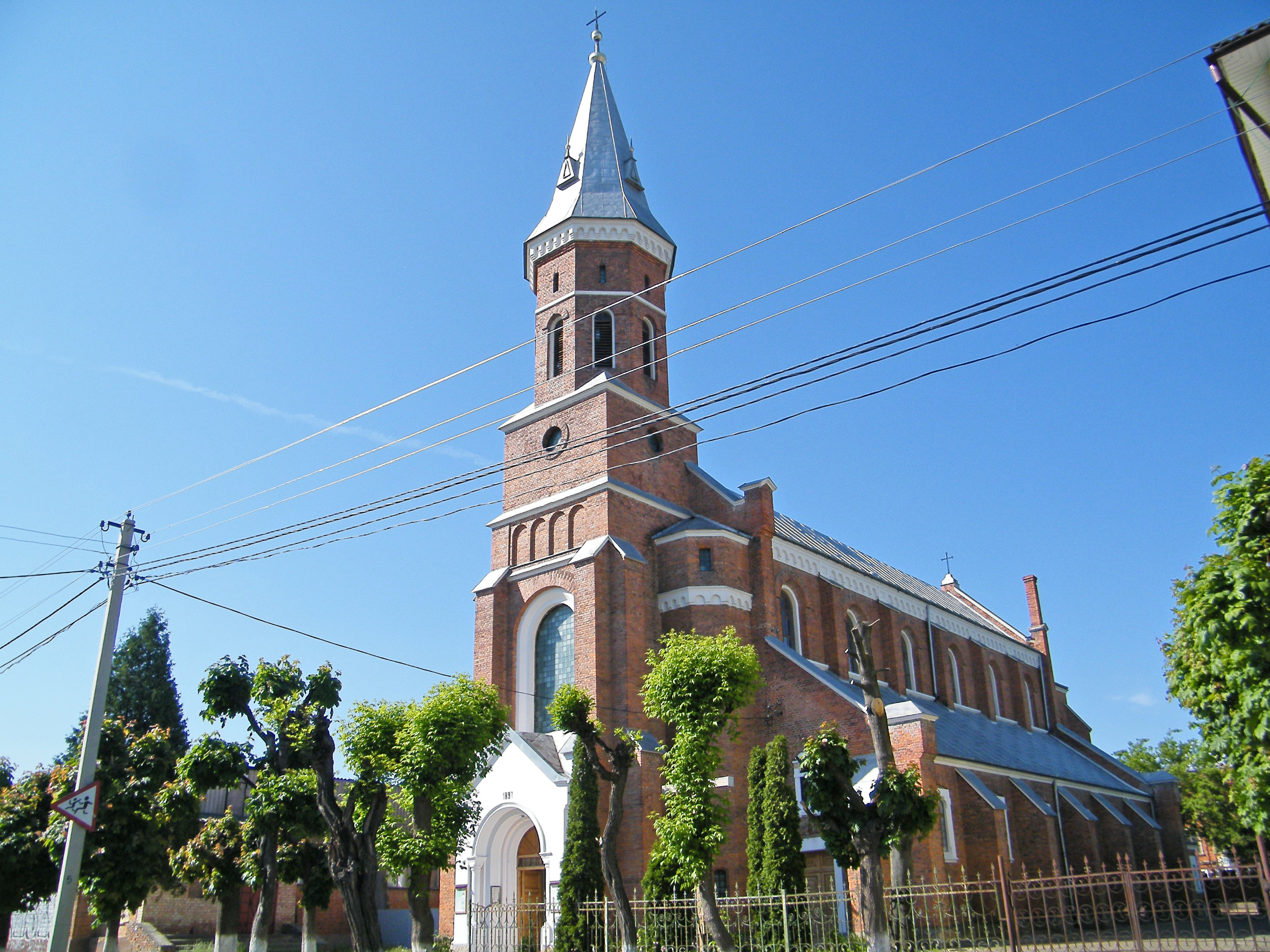
Church of St. Ignatius

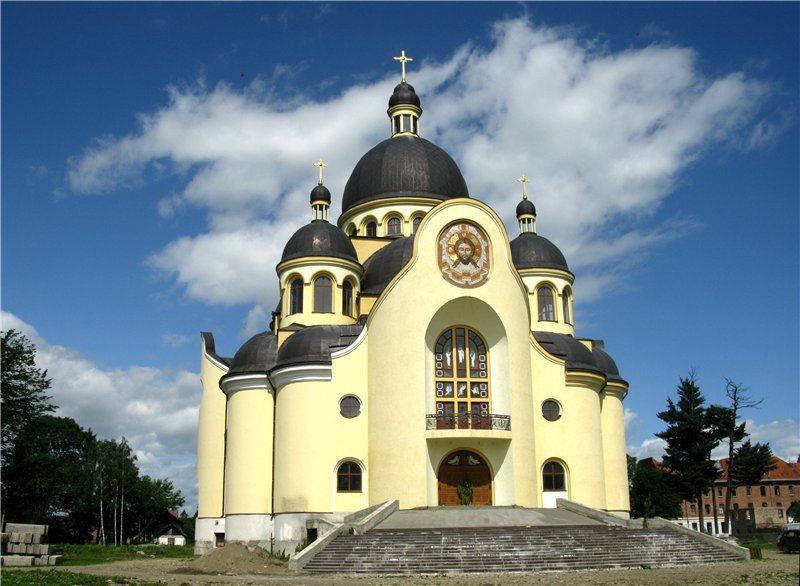
Transfiguration Cathedral

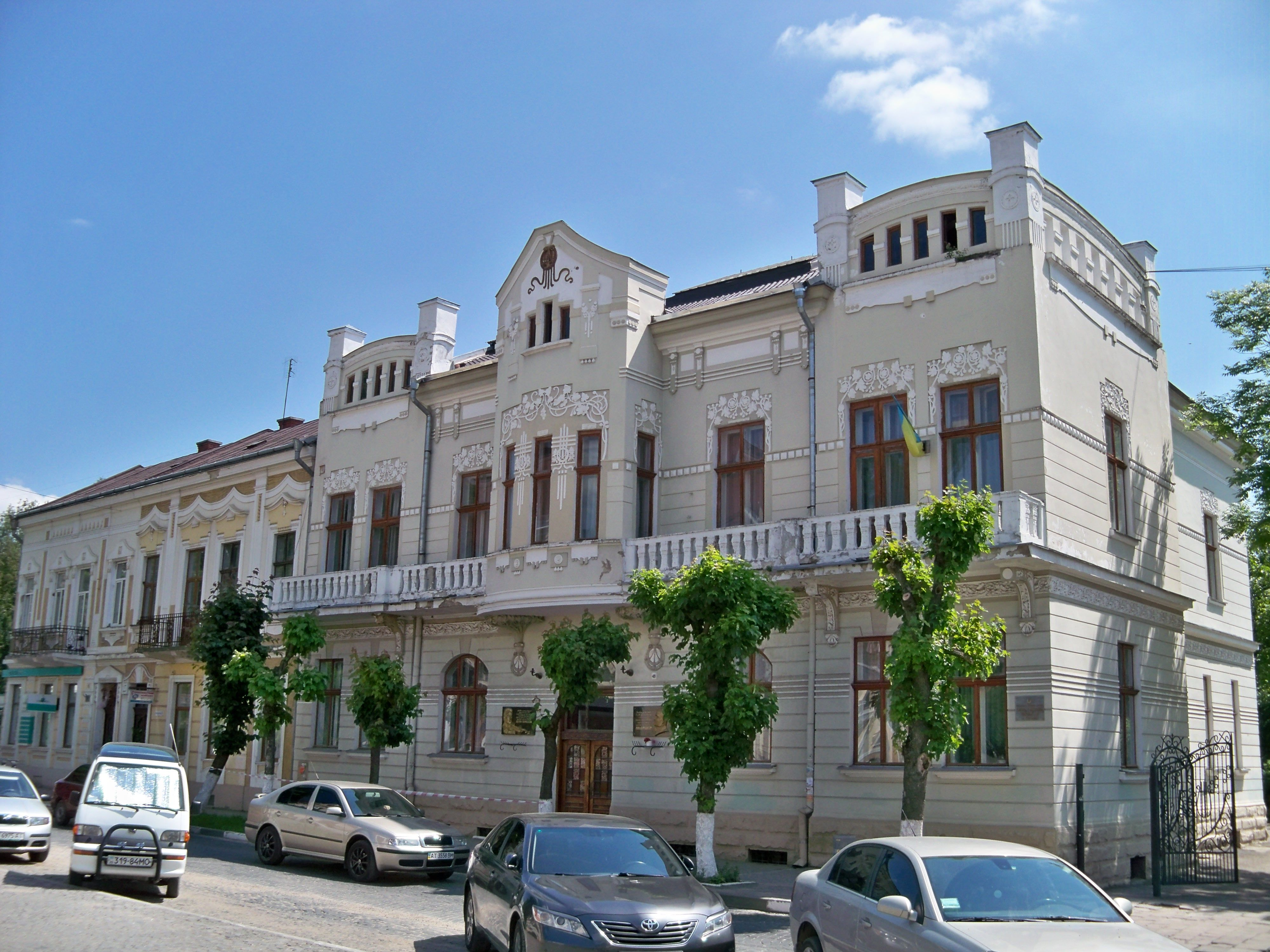
School of Music number 1

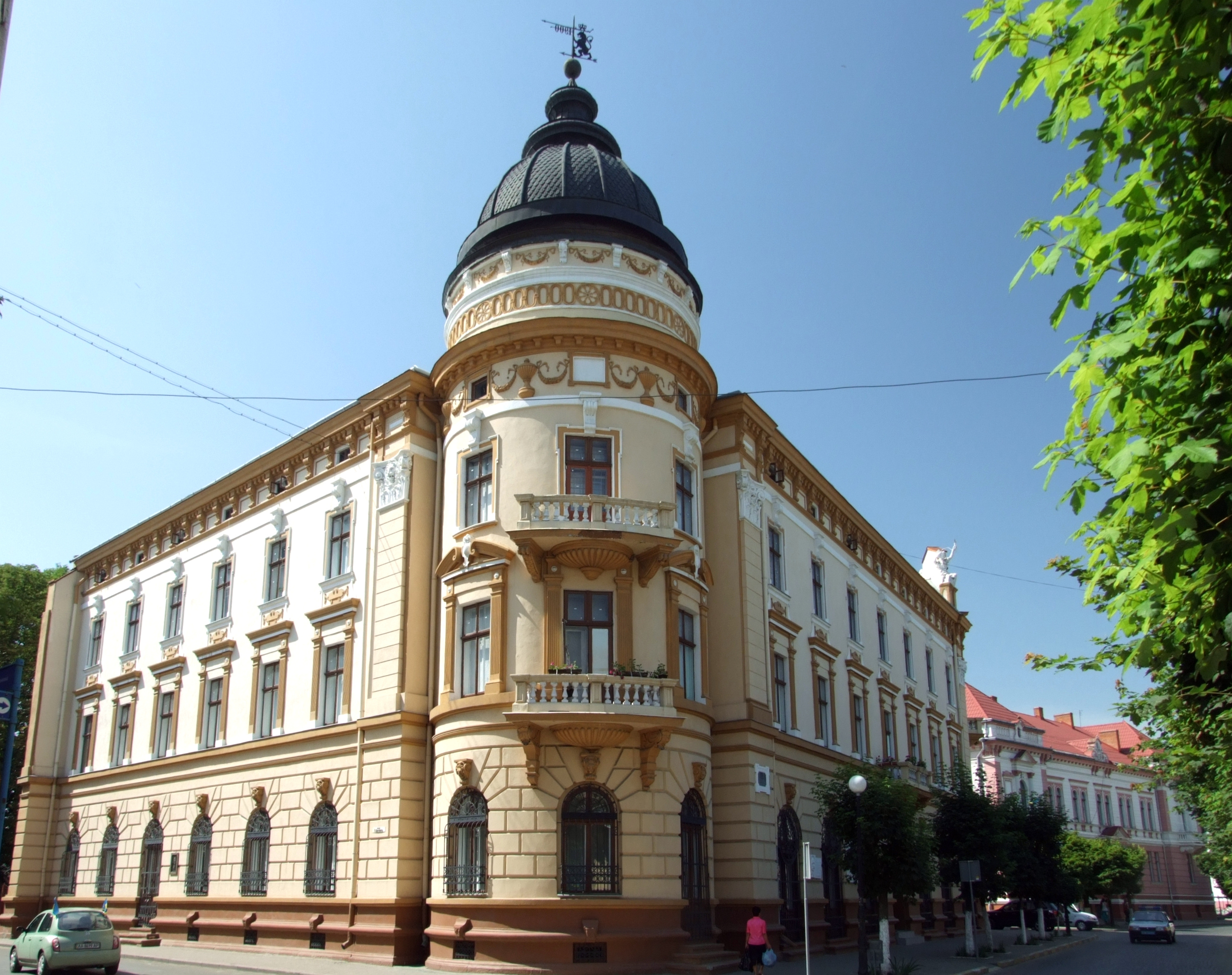
National Museum of Hutsulshchyna and Pokuttia Folk Art in Kolomyia

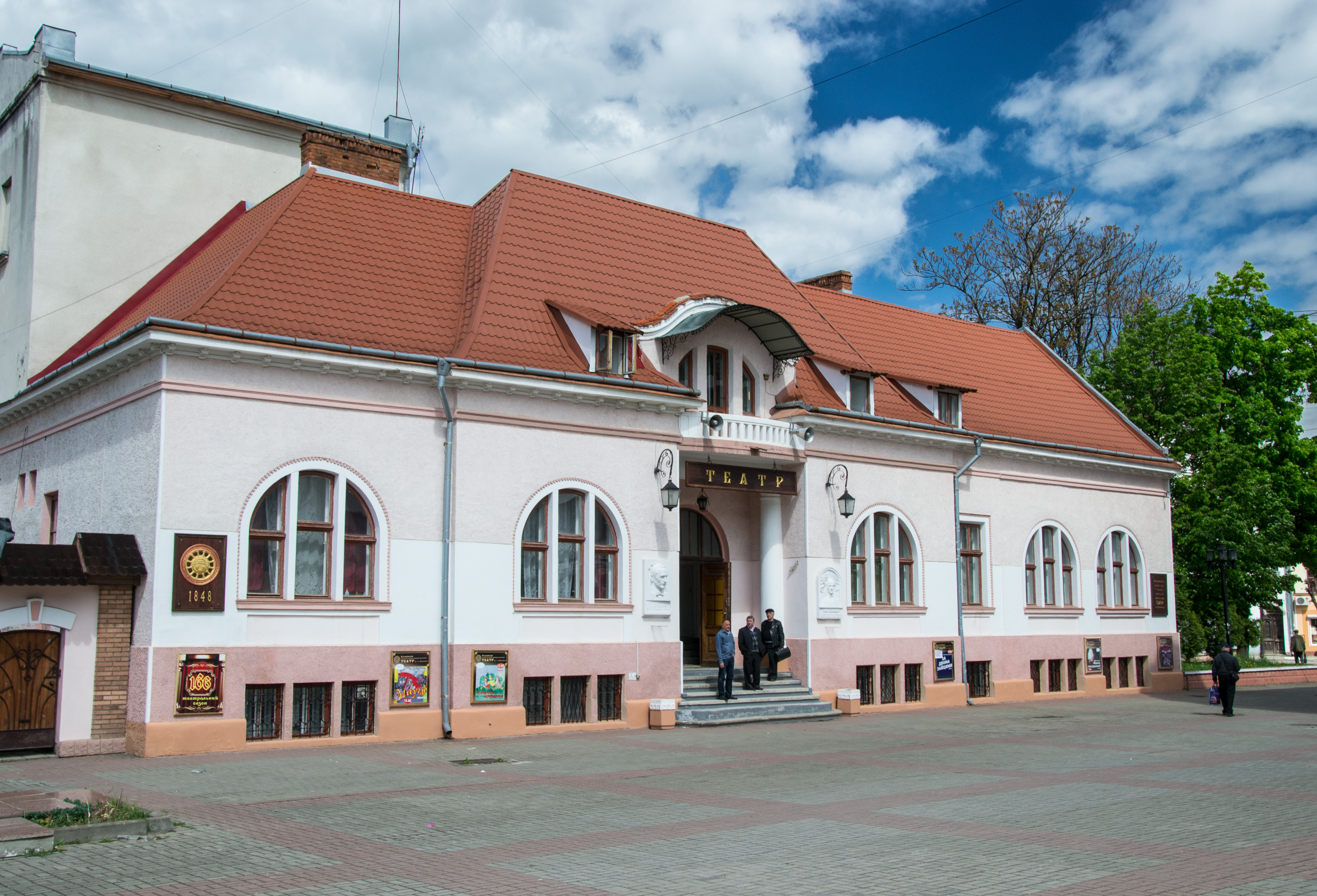
Academic Regional Ukrainian Drama Theater named after Ivan Ozarkevych

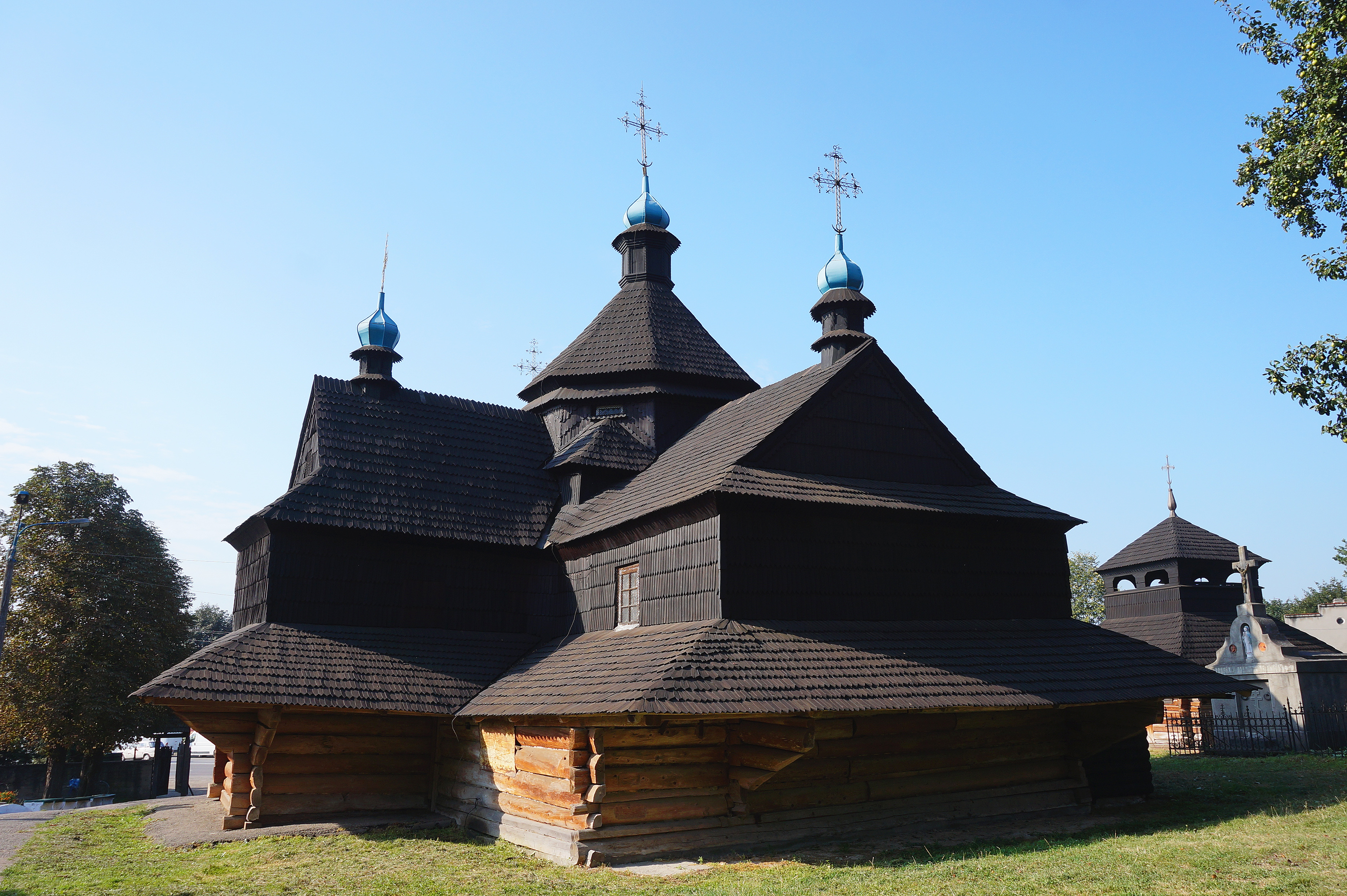
Church of the Annunciation of the Blessed Virgin Mary

== See also ==
- Kolomyjka, a dance in Ukrainian and Jewish klezmer music, which originated in Kolomyia.
- Pokuttia
