= Myroslava Kocherzhuk =

Ukrainian local historian

- Born: 27 August 1963 (age 63); Kolomyia, Ivano-Frankivsk region, Ukrainian SSR, Soviet Union
- Citizenship: Soviet Union; Ukraine
- Education: Lviv Polytechnic
- Occupations: Local historician, research associate of museum
- Years active: 1990-now

Myroslava Volodymyrivna Kocherzhuk (Ukrainian: Мирослава Володимирівна Кочержук; born 27 August 1963) is the local historian and research associate of the historical museum of Kolomyia.

== Biography ==
Myroslava Kocherzhuk was born on August 27, 1963, in Kolomyia, Soviet Union. In 1980, she graduated from the local school No. 1. In 1980-1985 she studied at the Department of Architecture in the Lviv Polytechnic.

In the end of 1980s she worked as an architect at the Chernivtsi Regional State Museum of Folk Architecture and Life and at the architectural bureau "Delta".

Since October 1990, she has been a research associate at the historical museum of Kolomyia, and since 2024, her deputy director.

During the 1990s, she prepared a number of programs on local radio and television, and also translated from Polish an excerpt from Kamil Baransky's book "Former Soldiers, Farmers, Hasidists..."

In 1997, together with Ivan Monolatiy and Maria Dvylyuk, she conducted the first historical and memorial expedition of the Department of Scientific Research of the historical museum of Kolomyia "Necropolis of Kolomyia".

In 1999, she participated in a European Union project to study European traditions in western Ukraine, which resulted in an exhibition about German settlements in Kolomyia and a guidebook "Visit the Ukrainian Carpathians".

In the mid-2000s, she created a series of local history studies in the second volume of the collection of memoirs and articles "Kolomiya and Kolomyia Region", published in 2008. She is also a member of the editorial board of the "Encyclopedia of Kolomyia Region".

In 2008, in cooperation with Mykola Vasylchuk, she translated Leopold Weigel's local history work "Essay on the City of Kolomyia" from Polish into Ukrainian.

In 2011, she published a major work on local history, “The Ukrainian State Gymnasium in Kolomyia, 1892–1944,” in the “Kolomyia Library” series. In the same year, she wrote a preface to the set of postcards, “Roman Kocherzhuk. Graphics,” and historical notes for the album “Kolomiya” on the occasion of the 770th anniversary of the first chronicle mention of the city.

In 2016, she became the author of local history articles for the art album “Kolomiya — Our Town: A Catalog of Postcards”.

In 2020, she participated in the program "Traveling Around the Country with Liliya Ruban", where she talked about the history of Kolomyia.

In 2022, in cooperation with Bohdan Voloshynskyi, she published a work about the esperantist from Kolomyia Orest Kuzma, "The Ukrainian Star of the Esperantist from Kolomyia".

In June 2024, she published his own book "What are the buildings of Kolomyia silent about?" as a 41st edition of book serie "Library of Kolomyia". She cooperated with the young local historian Illya Kryvoruchko.

In February 2025, her book was recognized as the best historical book of Prykarpattia in nomination "The urbanistics".

== Bibliography ==
- Вайгель Леопольд. Нарис про місто Коломию / Передмова М. Савчука; Передмова М. Васильчука; переклад з польської М. Васильчука, М. Кочержук. — Коломия: Вік, 2008. — 120 с. : ISBN 966-550-219-0
- Мирослава Кочержук. Українська державна гімназія в Коломиї (1892—1944 рр.) / Коломия: Вік, 2011. — 304 с. : ISBN 966-550-188-7
- Богдан Волошинський, Мирослава Кочержук. Українська зірка Коломийського есперантиста / Івано-Франківськ: Лілея-НВ, 2022. — 96 с. : ISBN 978-966-668-563-9
- Ілля Криворучко, Мирослава Кочержук. Про що мовчать коломийські будівлі. Частина перша / Коломия: Вік, 2024. — 304 с. : ISBN 966-550-248-4
