= Marek Lachs =

Polish lawyer and political activist

- Born: 1878; Kolomea, Austria-Hungary (now – Kolomyia, Ukraine)
- Died: 1943 (aged 64–65); Kolomea, Third Reich
- Citizenship: Austria-Hungary; Second Polish Republic
- Occupations: Community and political activist, lawyer

Marek Lachs (1878 – 1943) was a Polish lawyer and political activist of Jewish origin, head of the local Zionist organization, a member of the Zionist Party Council in Lviv, and a deputy of the Kolomyia City Council.

== Biography ==
Marek Lachs was born in 1878 in Kolomea to Chaim and Mona Lachs. From 1889 to 1896, he studied at the local Imperial and Royal Polish Gymnasium.

In 1903, according to the newspaper "Słowo Polskie" on April 22, he was mentioned as a candidate for lawyers who joined the editorial staff of the Polish newspaper in Kolomyia "Gazeta Kołomyjska". According to another newspaper, "Gazeta Lwowska", on November 27, 1906, he became the treasurer of the Provision Fund in Kolomyia "Unity". Later, he founded and edited the weekly newspaper "Kurier Kołomyjski", where the idea of preparing Poles to defend their independence according to Józef Piłsudski was promoted, anticipating the future struggle of the largest European powers. Because of this, Lachs had to endure remarks and confiscations from the Austria-Hungarian state prosecutor's office.

According to the recollections of eyewitnesses of the events of the ZUNR in Kolomyia, Lachs became the head of the Jewish National Council, created after the November Uprising in November 1918. He enjoyed the support of the Ukrainian government recognized this council as the official representation of all Jews of the city. In May 1919, when the Ukrainian troops left Kolomyia, dLachs, frightened by the consequences for the Jews after the arrival of the Romanian and later Polish troops, turned to two well-known Jewish figures, Dr. Allerhand and the author of the memoirs, and handed over to them the protocol leadership of the Jewish community, so that they, as "Jewish Poles", would ensure the protection of the population.

In the 1920s, he became the publisher of a local newspaper for the Jewish community "Nasz Głos".

In August 1926, he became a member of the board of the Credit Union for Small Trade and Industry. He also became the chairman of the local Zionist organization.

In February 1927, he gave a lecture on the topic "The General Situation of Jews in Nowadays". In April, as a legal advisor to the Jewish Rescue Committee, he was thanked by the Jewish Union of Widows, Widowers and Orphans of the Voivodeship "for the Easter subsidy of 205 zlotys provided to the poor, shy members of the Union, as well as all those who in any way contributed to the collection of 640 zlotys for this purpose for the poorest of the poor". In June, he was elected a deputy of the city council from the democratic party. On November 1, he became a member of the District Council of the Branch Office for Lesser Poland, and in November 23, he became a member of the commission for city enterprises, the economic and financial and legal commission at the city council.

In the early 1930s, he criticized the city council for not giving the opportunity to check the finances and reports for 1928/29 financial year, in particular regarding the costs exceeding the budget for the construction of the power plant's engine room (over 100,000 zlotys). In turn, the deputy Józef Sanojca in the newspaper "Tygodnik Pokucki Zjednoczenie" on January 26, 1930, responded by denying the accusations, noting that the funds were distributed under the supervision of officials and the expenses were documented, and that the entire "mystery" of Lachs' articles was exaggerated to create a sensation. Sanojca described the construction costs in detail and argued that no theft had occurred.

In 1930, he was elected a member of the Zionist Party Council in Lviv and the board of the Union of Jewish Merchants.

On April 5, 1931, he joined the arbitration committee of the Kolomyia branch of the Association of Unions of Jewish Disabled, Widows, and War Orphans. In June, he became a member of the advisory council of the government commissar.

In 1932, Marek Lachs headed the newly formed local committee of the Zionist Party, which united the previously divided factions. The committee was called upon to strengthen the party movement among the Jewish community and to coordinate preparations for opportunities in the British Mandate of Palestine.

In December 1933, he became a deputy of the city council. In March of the following year, he became a member of the commission on enterprises in the city council.

Before the German occupation of Kolomyia in 1941, he lived in his hometown.

He died in Kolomyia during the Holocaust in 1943, as attested by his cousin Zygmunt Schruber.
