= Stenzel =

Stenzel is a German surname. Also with Polish variants as: Sztencl, Sztencel, Stencl, Stencel or Czech: Štencel.

Notable people with the surname include:

- Abraham Nahum Stencl (1897–1983), Polish Yiddish poet
- Alex Stenzel (born 1965), German-American artist, fashion designer
- Alma Stencel (1888–1933), American pianist
- Chuck Stenzel
- Dorothy Hester Stenzel (1910–1991), American aviator, stunt pilot
- Edward Stenzel (1846–1910), Polish pharmacist, businessperson and cavalier
- Erbo Stenzel (1911–1980), Brazilian plastic artist and sculptor
- Fabian Stenzel (born 1986), German footballer
- Grzegorz Stencel (born 1962), Polish footballer
- Henryk Stenzel (1899–1980), American paleontologist of Polish and Jewish descent
- Jake Stenzel (1867–1919), American baseball player
- Jamie Stenzel (born 2002), birth name of Au/Ra, Antiguan-German singer-songwriter
- Jennie Stencel (born 1976), American traffic reporter
- Jan Štencel (born 1995), Czech ice hockey defenseman
- Marcel Stenzel (born 1992), German footballer
- Maria Stencel (1900–1985), Polish nurse who was a recipient of the International Florence Nightingale Medal
- Maria Stenzel (born 1998), Polish volleyball player
- Martin Stenzel (born 1946), German cyclist
- Martina Stenzel, Australian chemistry researcher
- Michael E. Stencel, American Adjutant General of the Oregon National Guard
- Pam Stenzel (born 1965), American sex educator
- Pascal Stenzel (born 1996), German footballer
- Reiner Stenzel, American plasma physicist
- Rüdiger Stenzel (born 1968), German middle distance runner
- Scott Stenzel (born 1980), American racing driver
- Shlomo Sztencl (1884–1919), Polish Rabbi, Rabbinical Judge, and Rosh Yeshiva
- Stefan Stenzel (1884–1942), Polish pharmacist, businessperson and victim of Soviet deportations to Kazakhstan
- Torsten Stenzel (born 1971), German musician and record producer
- Ursula Stenzel (born 1945), Austrian politician
- Vincent-Louis Stenzel (born 1996), German footballer
- Vlado Stenzel, "The Wizard" (born 1934), Croatian handballer and well-reputed handball coach
- Werner Stenzel (1943 - 2021), Austrian diplomat and ethnologist
- Yonah Sztencl (1904–1969), Polish Orthodox Rabbi

== Other ==
- Casa Erbo Stenzel, historic building in the city of Curitiba, Brazil
- Powell Buist Stenzel syndrome
