= Hellen (disambiguation) =

Hellen was the progenitor of the Hellenes in Greek mythology.

Hellen may also refer to:

== People ==
- Hellen (given name), feminine given name
- Hellén, a surname, including a list of people with the name
- Robert Hellen (1725–1793), Irish politician and judge

== Other uses ==
- Cyclone Hellen, tropical cyclone over the Mozambique Channel in March 2014
- Hellen, a shipwreck in 1803

== See also ==
- Helen (disambiguation)
- Beth Montague-Hellen (fl. from 2017), English librarian
- Hans van der Hellen, 17th century Dutch printer
- Eduard von der Hellen (1863–1927), German writer
