= Etta Federn =

- Etta Federn in Barcelona, 1934
- Born: April 28, 1883; Vienna, Austria
- Died: May 9, 1951 (aged 68); Paris, France
- Occupations: Writer, translator
- Writing career
- Pen name: Etta Federn-Kohlhaas, Marietta Federn, Etta Federn-Kirmsse, Esperanza
- Genres: Literary biography, women's history

Etta Federn-Kohlhaas (April 28, 1883 – May 9, 1951) or Marietta Federn, also published as Etta Federn-Kirmsse and Esperanza, was a writer, translator, educator and important woman of letters in pre-war Germany. In the 1920s and 1930s, she was active in the anarcho-syndicalist movement in Germany and Spain.

== Early life and education ==
She born in Vienna, Austria, to a distinguished Jewish family. Her mother, Ernestine Federn, was a member of the women's suffrage movement in Austria. Her father, Salomon Federn, was a prominent doctor and pioneer in the monitoring of blood pressure. Her paternal grandfather Elias Bunzelfedern was a well-known liberal rabbi in Prague.

Her sister Else was a social worker in Vienna, active in the Settlement Movement. A park in Vienna was named for her in 2013.

Her brother Paul was a psychoanalyst and, with colleague Alfred Adler a follower of Sigmund Freud. An expert on ego psychology and the treatment of psychosis, he served as vice president of the Vienna Psychoanalytic Society.

In Vienna and Berlin, Etta Federn studied literary history, German philology and Ancient Greek.

== Career ==
Federn moved to Berlin in 1905, where she became a literary critic, translator, novelist and biographer. She worked in many genres, publishing articles, biographies, literary studies and poetry. She published 23 books in Germany, among them translations from the Danish, Russian, Bengali, Ancient Greek, Yiddish and English. She also published two books while living in Spain. She also wrote a young adult novel, Ein Sonnenjahr (A Year of Sun), as well as an adult novel that remained unpublished.

The Image of Woman by Etta Federn, 1917

As a journalist, she was a literary critic for the Berliner Tageblatt, an influential liberal newspaper. She wrote biographies of Dante Alighieri and Christiane Vulpius (wife of Johann von Goethe). In 1927, she published a biography of Walther Rathenau, the liberal Jewish Foreign Minister of Germany, who had been assassinated in 1922 by anti-Semitic right-wing terrorists. Her biography was reviewed by Gabriele Reuter for the New York Times, which called Federn's account "amazingly lucid and precise" and said it "gives a beautifully clear idea of [Rathenau's] life." Following the book’s publication, Federn became the target of Nazi death threats.

During the 1920s, Federn became part of a circle of anarchists, including Rudolf Rocker, Mollie Steimer, Senya Fleshin, Emma Goldman, and Milly Witkop Rocker, who would become her close friend. She contributed to various anarchist newspapers and journals related to the Free Workers' Union of Germany.

In 1927, her book Goethe's Faust received a favorable review in the New York Times, again by Gabriele Reuter. who wrote that the "simple, objectively written little book is to be recommended particularly to foreigners and young people," demystifying Faust by viewing it as Goethe's "spiritual and intellectual autobiography."

In Berlin, Federn also met and translated several Polish-born Jewish poets who wrote in Yiddish. In 1931, her translation of the Yiddish poetry collection Fischerdorf (Fishing Village) by Abraham Nahum Stencl was published. Thomas Mann gave the book a favorable review, admiring Stencl's "passionate poetic emotion." (The work would soon be destroyed in the Nazi book burnings).

In 1932, Federn left Berlin, realizing that under the Nazis she would no longer be able to publish her writing. She moved with her sons to Barcelona, Spain, where she joined the anarchist movement Mujeres Libres (Free Women), which provided such services as maternity centers, daycare centers, and literacy training to women. She learned Spanish and became director of four progressive schools in the city of Blanes, educating both teachers and children in secular values and antimilitarism. In 1934, she was interviewed in the magazine La Mirador about a controversy concerning her palm reading, an art she had practiced for many years, and whether it contributed to the suicide of a young man in Barcelona. She denied that her palm reading had any connection.

Starting in 1936, she published articles in the movement's women-run anarcha-feminist magazine, also called Mujeres Libres. All issues of the magazine, known for its passionate writing and sophisticated design, can be viewed at La revista Mujeres Libres.

Like many anarchist women, Etta Federn believed in the importance of literacy for women, in birth control and sexual freedom, and in the power of educated women to be good mothers. She wrote: "Educated mothers relate their own experiences and sufferings to their children; they intuitively understand their feelings and expressions. They are good educators, as they are also friends of the children they educate."

In 1938, toward the end of the Spanish Civil War, as Francisco Franco's fascists bombed Barcelona and defeated the Republicans, she fled to France. There, hunted by the Gestapo as a Jew and member of the French Resistance, she survived World War II in hiding in Lyon, at times in a monastery, and did translation work for the French Resistance. She was held in internment camps as a foreign refugee.

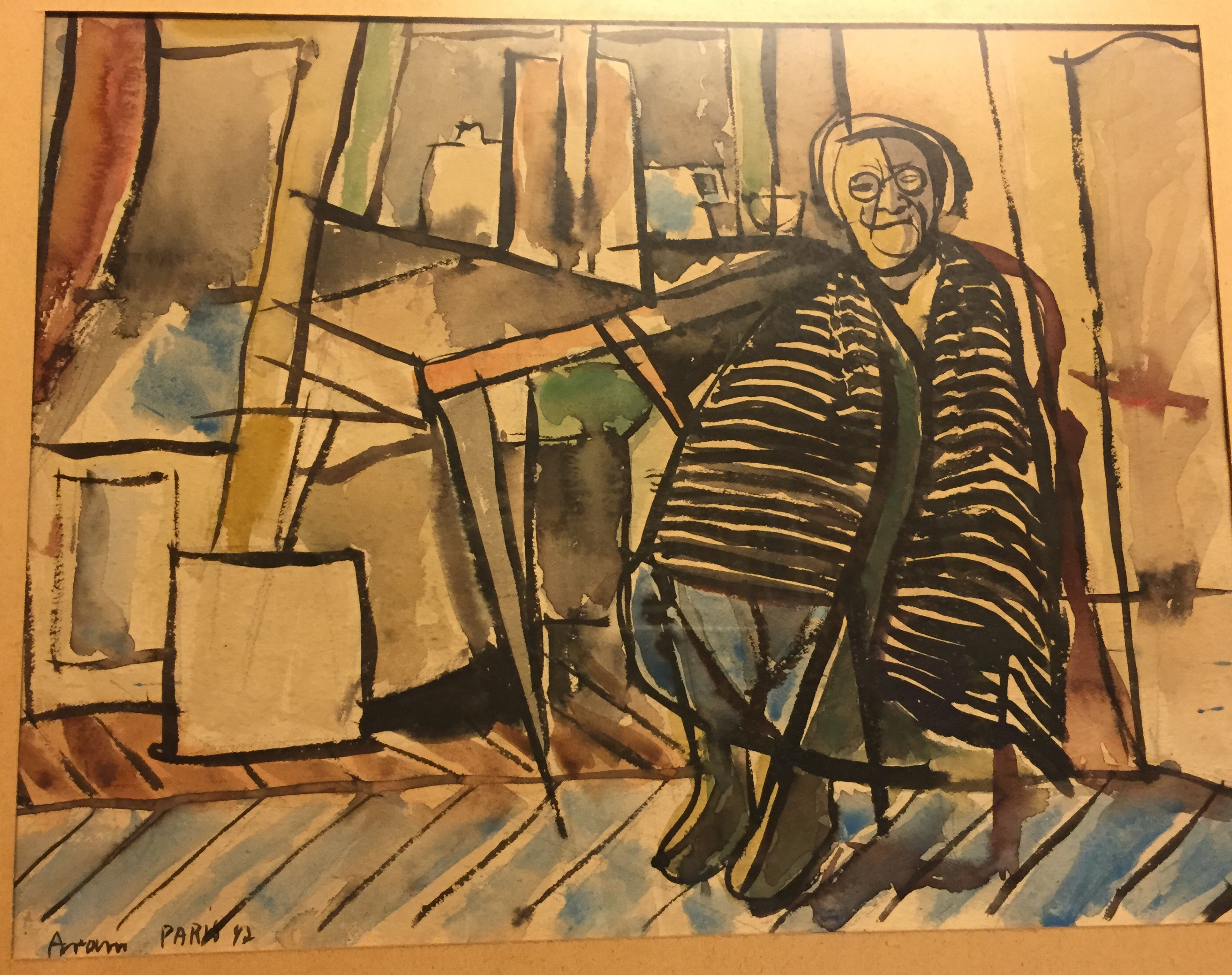
Portrait of Etta Federn in Paris, ca. 1947

== Personal life and death ==
Etta Federn's first husband was Max Bruno Kirmsse, who taught children with mental disabilities. Her second husband was Peter Paul Kohlhaas, an illustrator. She had two sons, Hans and Michael, one from each marriage. Her older son, known as Capitaine Jean in the French Resistance, was murdered by French collaborators in 1944.

She spent her final years in Paris, supported in part by her relatives in the USA and doing palm readings based on her psychological insights. Because her son was killed as a Resistance fighter, she was awarded French citizenship. After many years of ill health, exhaustion, and grief over the death of her older son, she died in Paris in 1951.

== Legacy ==
The story of Etta Federn and her unequal love for her two sons inspired Stig Dagerman's 1948 play Skuggan av Mart (Marty's Shadow). Dagerman was one of Sweden's leading authors at that time. The play he based loosely on Federn was first performed at the Royal Dramatic Theatre in Stockholm, and has since been performed in many countries, including Ireland, the Netherlands, Cyprus, and France. Marty's Shadow was first performed in New York in 2017, by the August Strindberg Repertory Theatre.

== Selected books by Etta Federn ==
- Christiane von Goethe: Ein Beitrag zur Psychologie Goethes (Christiane von Goethe: A Contribution to Goethe's Psychology). Munich: Delphin. 1916.
- Friedrich Hebbel. Munich: Delphin. 1920.
- Goethe: Sein Leben der reifenden Jugend erzählt. (Goethe: His Life Story for Young Adults). Stuttgart: Union Deutsche Verlagsgesellschaft. 1922.
- Dante: Ein Erlebnis für werdende Menschen (Dante: An Experience for the Expecant). Stuttgart: Union Deutsche Verlagsgesellschaft. 1923.
- Goethes Faust. Berlin: Horodisch & Marx. 1927.
- Walther Rathenau: Sein Leben und Wirken (Walther Rathenau: His Life and Work). Dresden: Reissner. 1927.
- Mujeres de las revoluciones (Revolutionary Women). Barcelona: Mujeres libres. 1936. Reissued in German as Etta Federn: Revolutionär auf ihre Art, von Angelica Balabanoff bis Madame Roland, 12 Skizzen unkonventioneller Frauen (Etta Federn: Revolutionary in her Way: From Angelica Balabanoff to Madame Roland, 12 Sketches of Unconventional Women), edited and translated by Marianne Kröger, 1997.

== Translations ==
- H.C. Andersens Märchen, Tales of Hans Christian Andersen, translated from the Danish, 1923. Reissued 1952.
- Shakespeare-Lieder, Sonnets of William Shakespeare, translated from the English, 1925.
- Wege der liebe : drei Erzählungen (The Ways of Love: Three Stories), by Alexandra Kollontai, translated from the Russian, 1925. Reissued 1982.
- Gesichte, Poems of Samuel Lewin, translated from the Yiddish, 1928.
- Fischerdorf (Fishing Village), Poems of A. N. Stencl, translated from the Yiddish, 1931.
- Sturm der Revolution (The Storm of Revolution), Poems of Saumyendranath Tagore, translated from the Bengali, 1931.
- Anakreon, Poems of Anacreon, translated from the Ancient Greek, 1935.
