= Yonah Sztencl =

Jewish Orthodox Rabbi (1904–1969)

Rabbi Yonah Sztencl
- יונה שטנצל
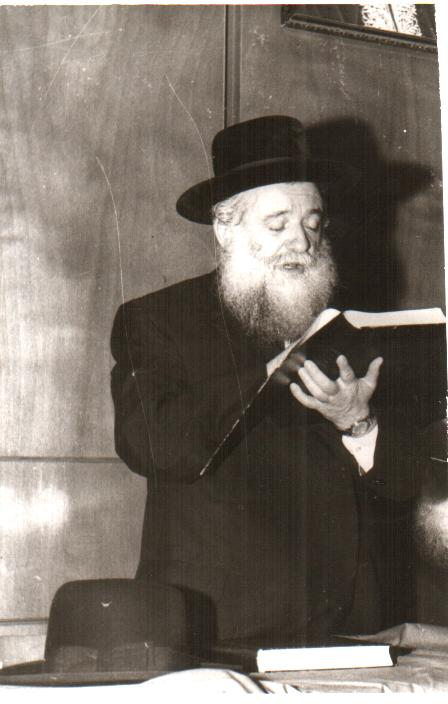
- Born: August 3, 1904; Sosnowiec, Poland
- Died: July 5, 1969 (aged 64); Tel Aviv, Israel
- Resting place: Shomrei Shabbos Cemetery, Bnei Brak, Israel
- Occupation: Rabbi
- Known for: Founder of the Mishnah Yomis and the Halacha Yomis
- Predecessor: None (Founder)
- Successor: Shlomo Sztencl (d. 2013)
- Spouse: Sheva Fiszel
- Children: Shlomo Sztencl, Rachel Kalikstein, Esther Robinson
- Parent(s): Shlomo Sztencl and Miriam Baila Zweigenhaft
- Relatives: Avrohom Nachum Sztencl (uncle), Rabbi Shlomo Zev Zweigenhaft (brother-in-law)

Yona Sztencl (Hebrew: יונה שטנצל, pronounced [joˈna ˈʃtentsel]; August 3, 1904 – July 5, 1969) was an Orthodox rabbi who founded the Mishnah Yomis and the Halacha Yomis. He also served as the rabbi of Congregation Bais Hassidim Arlenger in Tel Aviv and was a member of the Chief Rabbinate of Tel Aviv.

== Family background ==
Sztencl was born in Sosnowiec, Poland on 3 August 1904 to Rabbi Shlomo and Miriam Baila Zweigenhaft. Sztencl was born into a rabbinical family. His father Shlomo was a Polish Orthodox Jewish rabbi who served as Chief Rabbi of Czeladź, Poland, and Rav, dayan, and rosh yeshiva of Sosnowiec, Poland. He also authored Koheles Shlomo and Beis Shlomo. Sztencl's mother Miriam was the daughter of Rabbi Efraim Mordechai Mottel Zweigenhaft who served as a Posek and Shochet in Sosnowiec.

== Biography ==
In his youth Sztencl studied in Kraków, Poland. His study partner, Moshe Mordechai Biderman would later become Grand Rabbi of the Lelov dynasty. Thereafter, Sztencel was one of the first students to study in the famed Chachmei Lublin Yeshiva. In 1932, Sztencl married Sheva Fiszel, the daughter of a businessman in Sosnowiec. In 1935, Sztencl immigrated to Palestine and settled in Tel Aviv where, in addition to serving as the Rabbi of a local synagogue named "Bais Chassidim - Erlanger", he was appointed as a member of the Chief Rabbinate of Tel Aviv. Initially his duties involved overseeing the Kashrut in Tel Aviv, a position which he held jointly with Grand Rabbi Shemuel Eliyahu Taub of the Modzitz dynasty. Thereafter, Sztencl was appointed as the sole authority in Sabbath enforcement. After most of his family was murdered in the Holocaust, Sztencl created the Mishnah Yomis and the Halacha Yomis as a spiritual merit for the millions of victims of the Holocaust. These programs received overwhelming support from many Rabbinical authorities of the time, among them, Rabbi Isser Zalman Meltzer, Rabbi Moshe Feinstein, Rabbi Avraham Mordechai Alter and Rabbi Menachem Mendel Schneerson.

== Works ==
- Halacha Yomis Calendar
