= Halacha Yomis =

Learning program for Jewish law

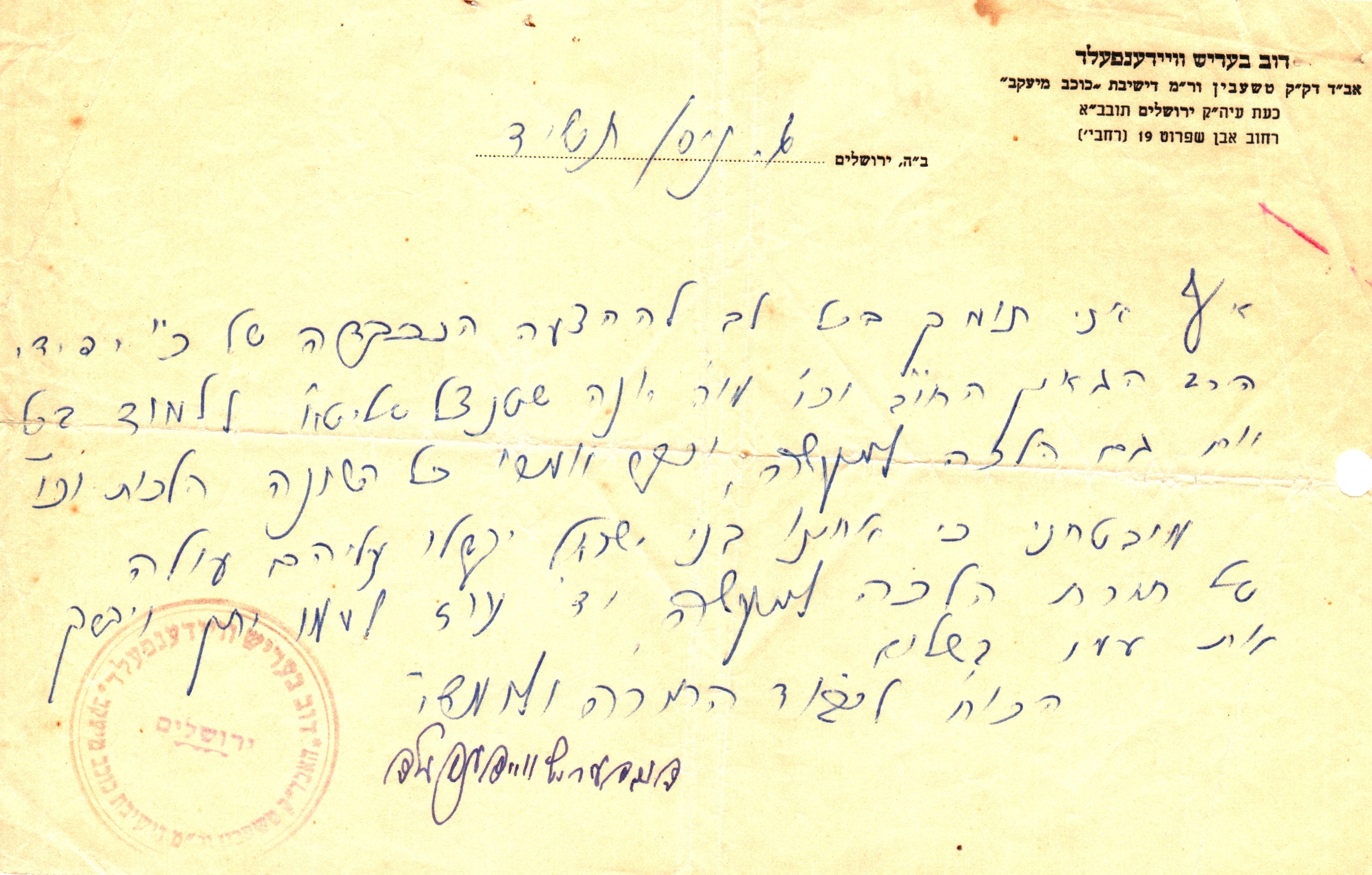
Rabbi Dov Berish Weidenfeld (1881–1965; Chief Rabbi of Tshebin) on the importance of learning the Halacha Yomis of Rav Yonah Sztencl Zatzal

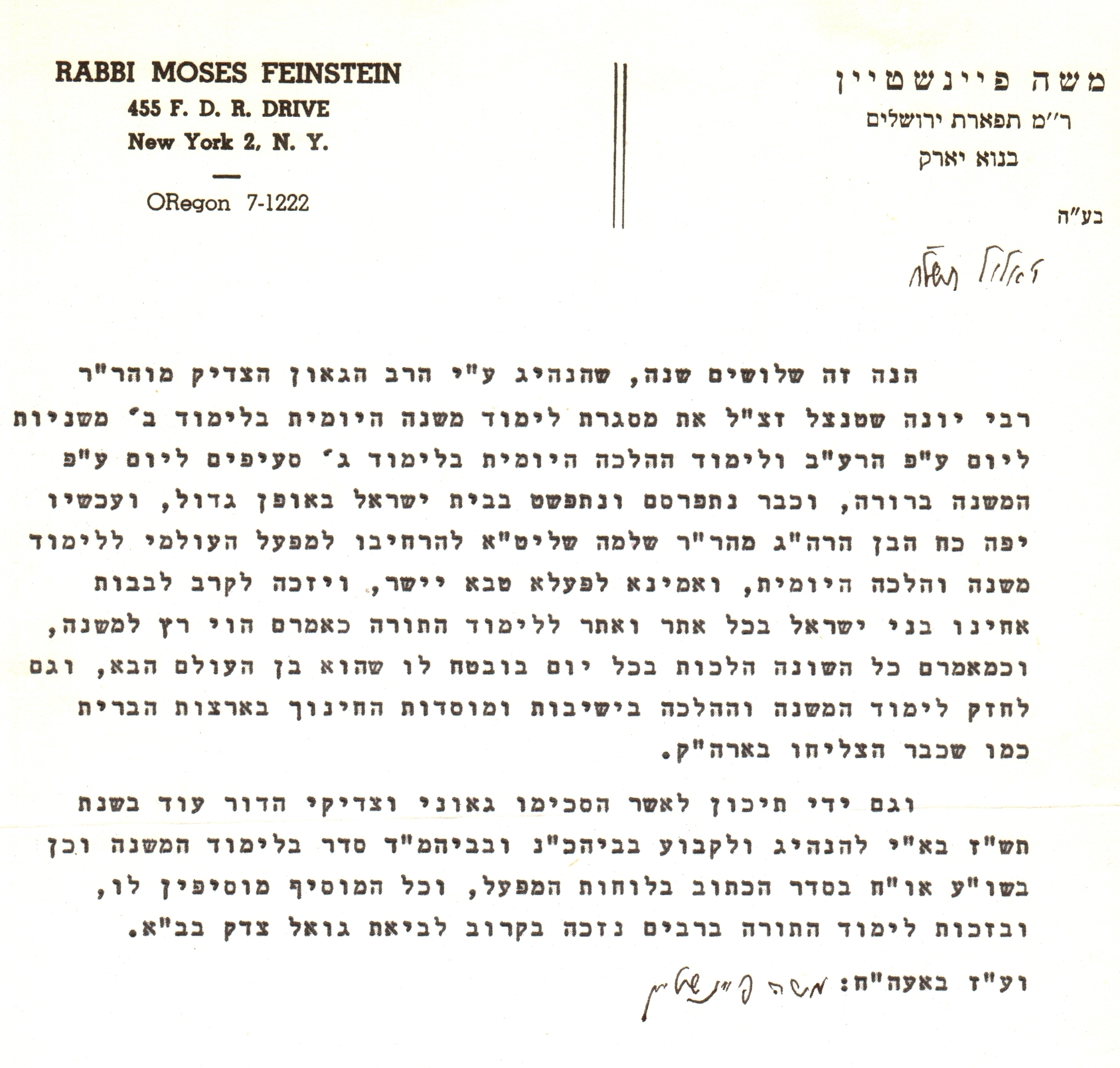
Rabbi Moshe Feinstein on daily Mishnah Yomis and Halacha Yomis studies

The Halacha Yomis Program (or Halacha Yomit, as it is known in Israel) is a learning program which covers the entire Shulchan Aruch Orach Chaim followed by the Kitzur Shulchan Aruch. The cycle takes about 4 years to complete. Every day, Jewish participants study 3 se’ifim (subsections) of Shulchan Aruch or 5 se’ifim of Kitzur.

Kitzur Shulchan Aruch is covered in addition to Shulchan Aruch Orach Chaim to include the generally applicable halachas not included in Orach Chaim.

== History ==
The Halacha Yomis was started circa 1950 by Yonah Sztencl, under the guidance of many Orthodox Jewish leaders of the time, including Avrohom Yeshaya Karelitz. The Halacha Yomis and the Mishnah Yomis (also started at about the same time) were launched in the memory of the six million Jews that were murdered in the Holocaust.

Breslov hasidim have a similar practice to daily review the Shulchan Aruch.

== See also ==
- Other study cycles, under Torah study #Study cycles
