= Gabriele Reuter =

German writer (1859–1941)

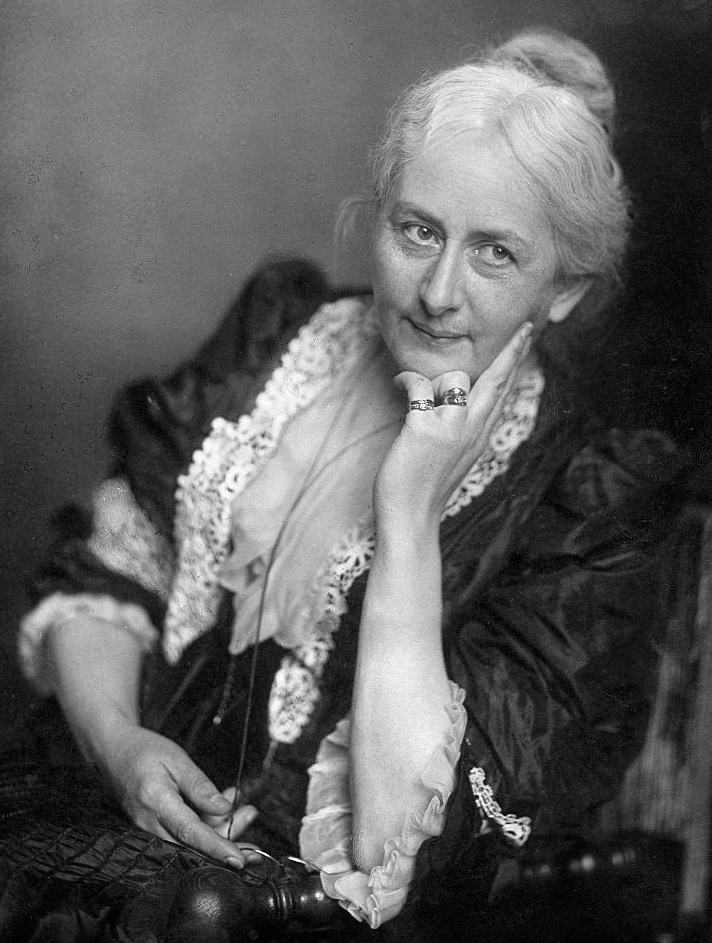
Gabriele Reuter in 1907

Gabriele Reuter (8 February 1859 – 16 November 1941) was a German writer.

Gabriele Reuter, who was widely read in her lifetime though now is almost forgotten, was known for her novel From a Good Family (Aus guter Familie, 1895), subtitled "the Passion of a Girl", which described a typical young woman of the Wilhelmine era. Other bestsellers were her novels Ellen of the Meadows (Ellen von der Weiden, 1900), the short story collection Women's Souls (Frauenseelen, 1901) and the novel The Americans (Der Amerikaner, 1907).

== Biography ==
Gabriele Reuter was born on 8 February 1859 in Alexandria (then part of the Egypt Eyalet), where her father was an international merchant in the textile trade sector. She was a great-granddaughter of the poet Philippine Engelhard. She spent her childhood partly with her mother's relatives in Dessau (1864–69), partly in Alexandria (1869–72). After the family's return to Germany in 1872, her father died. Reuter attended finishing school for a year, but then the family lost its entire fortune, due to the general recession in the international trading system and fraud in the dissolution of her father's business, and they moved to a small apartment in Neuhaldensleben.

The responsibility for younger brothers and her increasingly depressive mother led to Gabriele Reuter becoming unusually independent at an early age. The financial problems also led to her, as a young woman, using her writing talent as a source of income. In 1875/76 her first literary publications appeared in local newspapers. These were followed by conventionally written novels with an exotic flavour. The money Reuter earned from these publications funded the family move to Weimar in 1879, where she tried to establish herself as a young writer. Toward the end of the 1880s or early in the 1890s, she first travelled independently to Berlin, Vienna and Munich, to various writers conferences, and made acquaintance with other artists of the time, among them the anarchist and poet John Henry Mackay, with whom she had a long-standing friendship, and Henrik Ibsen.

In 1890 Reuter moved with her mother to Munich wishing to become part of the literary Bohemian movement. She attended the founding ceremony of George Michael Conrad's "society for modern life." According to her autobiography, From Child to Adult (1921), Reuter here came up with the idea for her successful novel From a Good Family. In 1891 her mother fell ill, and Reuter was forced to return with her to Weimar. There, she established in the following years a new circle of friends (including Hans Olden and his wife Grete, Rudolf Steiner and Eduard von der Hellen), and read the writings of Friedrich Nietzsche, Arthur Schopenhauer and Ernst Haeckel. She became acquainted with the organisation "Free Stage" in Berlin and the Friedrichshagener Circle and others including Gerhart Hauptmann, Otto Erich Hartleben, Ernst von Wolzogen and, through Mackay, the publisher Samuel Fischer, who, at the end of 1895, published her novel From a Good Family.

The novel was a huge success and sparked a heated debate in literary magazines and feminist pamphlets. Reuter became famous overnight. That same year she moved with her mother back to Munich, as one of her brothers had begun practising as a doctor there. On 28 October 1897 Reuter gave birth in Erbach (Württemberg) to her illegitimate daughter Elisabeth (Lili). The father was Bruno Ruttenaüer, which was not open knowledge in Gabriele's life, but revealed in an article by Ulrich Hauer, 'Gabriele Reuter. Jugendjahre in Alt- und Neuhaldensleben', in Jahresschrift der Museen des Landkreises Börde. Bd. 49 (16). Haldensleben 2009, pp. 37–74: the Nazi racial laws of Nazi Germany required disclosure of all ancestors of Elisabeth, and paternity is noted in the birth registry office of Erbach / Donau. The circumstances of her pregnancy and childbirth may have informed her novel The House of Tears.

In 1899, Reuter moved to Berlin. In the thirty years she lived there, she published numerous novels, short stories, children's books and essays that took up the theme of gender and generational conflict. Gabriele Reuter has been praised for her fine psychological depictions and was seen as a 'poet of the female soul'. Her novel The House of Tears (1908), in which she described the rather drastic conditions in a home for unmarried pregnant women, caused a new scandal. After the end of the First World War she worked as a columnist for the Neue Freie Presse and in her last years as a reviewer for the New York Times. In 1929 she returned to Weimar as a septuagenarian, where she died on 16 November 1941.

== Characterization ==
Reuter's successful novel From a Good Family is influenced by the innovative literary movements of the late 19th Century, such as Realism and naturalism. Together with Helene Böhlau's novel The Yard (1896) she set the pattern for many other female confessional or self-determination novels of the era. The debate about the novel initially focused on the question of whether the work is a 'Tendenzroman', that is, a novel with a particular purpose or message. Reuter's attitude to the contemporary women's movement was ambiguous, if not aloof. The women's rights campaigner Helene Stöcker praised the work of Reuter several times. Hedwig Dohm's comments on the occasion of the publication of The House of Tears were rather skeptical. 'Antifeminists' accused Reuter of having an overly one-sided female perspective. Reuter did not allow herself to be swayed by either one side or the other. From a Good Family has often been compared with Goethe's The Sorrows of Young Werther because of the way the protagonist was representative of a social trend. Thomas Mann interpreted the novel as a contemporary artist novel.

== Works ==
=== Novels ===
- Happiness and Money. A novel from Today's Egypt, (Glück und Geld. Roman aus dem heutigen Egypten Leipzig (W. Friedrich) 1888)
- Colonists., (Kolonistenvolk Leipzig (W. Friedrich) 1891 edition: Berlin (S. Fischer), 1897)
- From a Good Family, (Aus guter Familie. Leidensgeschichte eines MädchensBerlin (S. Fischer) 1895)
- Frau Bürgelin and her Sons. Novel, (Frau Bürgelin und ihre Söhne. Berlin (S. Fischer) 1899)
- Ellen of the Meadows. A diary, (Ellen von der Weiden. Ein TagebuchVienna (Geyer) 1900, Berlin (S. Fischer) 1901)
- Margaret's Mission, (Margaretes Mission. Roman2 vols, Stuttgart and Leipzig (DVA) 1904)
- Liselotte von Reckling, (Liselotte von Reckling. Roman. Berlin (S. Fischer) 1903)
- The American, (Der Amerikaner. Roman Berlin (S. Fischer) 1907)
- The House of Tears, (Das Tränenhaus. Roman Berlin (S. Fischer) 1908)
- Spring frenzy, (Frühlingstaumel. Roman 1911)
- Into the new country, (Ins neue Land Berlin and Vienna (Ullstein) 1915)
- The youth of an idealist, (Die Jugend eines Idealisten Berlin (S. Fischer) 1917)
- The Mistress, Die Herrin 1918)
- Benedicta, (Benedikta 1923)
- Daughters. The novel of two generations, (Töchter. Der Roman zweier GenerationenBerlin (Ullstein) 1927)
- Irmgard and her Brother, (Irmgard und ihr Bruder. RomanBerlin (DBG) 1930)
- From the Girl who Could Not Love, (Vom Mädchen, das nicht lieben konnte Berlin (Ullstein) 1933)

=== Novellas and short stories ===
- Episode Hopkins. Too late. Two studies, (Episode Hopkins. Zu spät. Zwei Studien Dresden (E. Pierson) 1889)
- The art of living, (Der Lebenskünstler. Novellen Berlin (S. Fischer) 1897)
- Women's Souls, (Frauenseelen. Novellen Berlin (S. Fischer) 1901)
- Gunhild Kersten, (Gunhild Kersten. Novelle Stuttgart and Leipzig (DVA) 1904)
- Whimsical love, (Wunderliche Liebe. Novellen Berlin (S. Fischer) 1905)
- One of the Dead Return and other short stories, (Eines Toten Wiederkehr und andere Novellen Leipzig (Reclam) 1908)
- From the female heart, (Vom weiblichen Herzen. Novellen 1917)
- The House on Antoniuskirch Street, (Das Haus in der Antoniuskirchstraße, (Erzählung) 1928)

=== Essays and autobiographical writings ===
- John Henry Mackay. A literary study, (John Henry Mackay. Eine litterarische Studie in: Society 7 (1891), 1304–1314)
- Marie von Ebner-Eschenbach, (Berlin and Leipzig (Schuster & Loeffler) 1904)
- Annette von Droste-Hülshoff, (Berlin (B. Marquardt) 1906)
- The Problem of Marriage, (Die Probleme der Ehe 1907)
- Love and Suffrage, (Liebe und Stimmrecht Berlin (S. Fischer) 1914; excerpts reprinted in Emancipation and Literature. Text for discussion. A female reader, ed. by Hans Jürgen Blinn, Frankfurt am Main (S. Fischer) 1984, ISBN 3-596-23747-5, p. 204–210
- War and Girls, (Der Krieg und die Mädchenin: Scherls Jungmädchenbuch, ed. Lotte Gubalke. Berlin: Scherl o.J [1914], p. XI-XX)
- From Child to Adult. The Story of My Youth, (Vom Kinde zum Menschen. Die Geschichte meiner JugendBerlin (S. Fischer) 1921)
- Green Vines in Old Pictures, (Grüne Ranken um alte Bilder. Ein deutscher FamilienromanBerlin (G. Grote) 1937)

=== Dramas ===
- Ika's Picture (Ikas Bild (Lustspiel), 1894)

=== Stories for children and young people ===
- The Evil Princess (Das böse Prinzeßchen. Märchenspiel für Kinder (1904; music Margaret Marshal))
- Gentle Heart. A Book for Young Girls, (Sanfte Herzen. Ein Buch für junge Mädchen Berlin (S. Fischer) 1909)
- What Helmut Experienced in Germany (Was Helmut in Deutschland erlebte. Eine Jugendgeschichte with drawings by Rudolf Sievers Brunswick, Gotha (FA Perthes) 1917)
- Big City Girl, (Großstadtmädel. Jugendgeschichten Berlin (Ullstein) 1920)
- Grete's Bliss, (Grete fährt ins Glück Berlin and Leipzig (G. Weise) 1935)

== Legacy ==
The estate of Reuter is in the Goethe and Schiller Archive of the Weimar Classics Foundation in Weimar.

== Sources ==
- Faran Alimadad-man: Gabriele Reuter. Portrait of a Writer. (Gabriele Reuter. Porträt einer Schriftstellerin Bern (P. Lang) 1984th ISBN 3-261-03418-1)
- Gisela Brinker-Gabler: Prospects of Transition. Female Consciousness and Early Modernity, ( Perspektiven des Übergangs. Weibliches Bewußtsein und frühe Moderne in: Gisela Brinker-Gabler (ed.),German Women's Literature, HC Beck, Munich 1988, vol 2, p. 169–205.)
- Cornelia Pechota Vuilleumier: O father let us go! (O Vater, laß uns ziehn! Literarische Vater-Töchter um 1900. Gabriele Reuter, Hedwig Dohm, Lou Andreas-Salome. Olms, Hildesheim 2005) ISBN 3-487-12873-X
- Denise Roth: "Das literarische Werk erklärt sich selbst. Theodor Fontanes 'Effi Briest' und Gabriele Reuters 'Aus guter Familie' poetologisch entschlüsselt". WVB Wissenschaftlicher Verlag Berlin, Berlin 2012, ISBN 978-3-86573-679-6
