= Stefan Stenzel =

Polish pharmacist

- Born: 29 February 1884; Kolomea, Austria-Hungary (now - Kolomyia, Ukraine)
- Died: 31 March 1942 (aged 58); Yangiyoʻl, Uzbek SSR, Soviet Union
- Citizenship: Austria-Hungary; Second Polish Republic
- Education: University of Lwów
- Occupations: Pharmacist, businessperson
- Years active: 1911-1939
- Spouse: Sofia Semkowicz
- Children: Janina Stenzel; Sofia Stenzel
- Parent: Edward Stenzel

Stefan Stenzel (29 February 1884 – 31 March 1942) was the Polish pharmacist from Kolomyia, businessperson and victim of Soviet deportations to Kazakhstan.

== Biography ==
Stefan Stenzel was born on February 29, 1884, in Kolomea, in the family of a leading pharmacist Edward Stenzel.

In 1895–1901, he studied at the Polish Gymnasium in Kolomea. Then he studied at the Chemistry Department of the Faculty of Philosophy of the Francis I University of Lviv, finishing a master's degree of pharmacy. There, under the supervision of Prof. Bronisław Radzyszewski, he defended his thesis on the topic "On the Condensation of Benzene with Aldehydes Ortho- and Metatoluenes". Presumably, for this thesis at the University of Lwów, Stefan Stenzel received the degree of Doctor of Philosophy in 1908, as evidenced by the newspaper "Gazeta Lwowska" of June 14, 1908. Dr. Stenzel also worked as a "scholar" in the chemical laboratory of the university.

According to the decision of the District Court of Kolomyia on June 8, 1911, he officially inherited the pharmacy of his father Edward, who had died a year earlier, near the city hall. In December 1913, he became deputy head of the Catholic relief fund "Wyłom" in Kolomyia. Also during his stay in his hometown, Dr. Stenzel was a member of the Tatra Society and the Society of Public Schools.

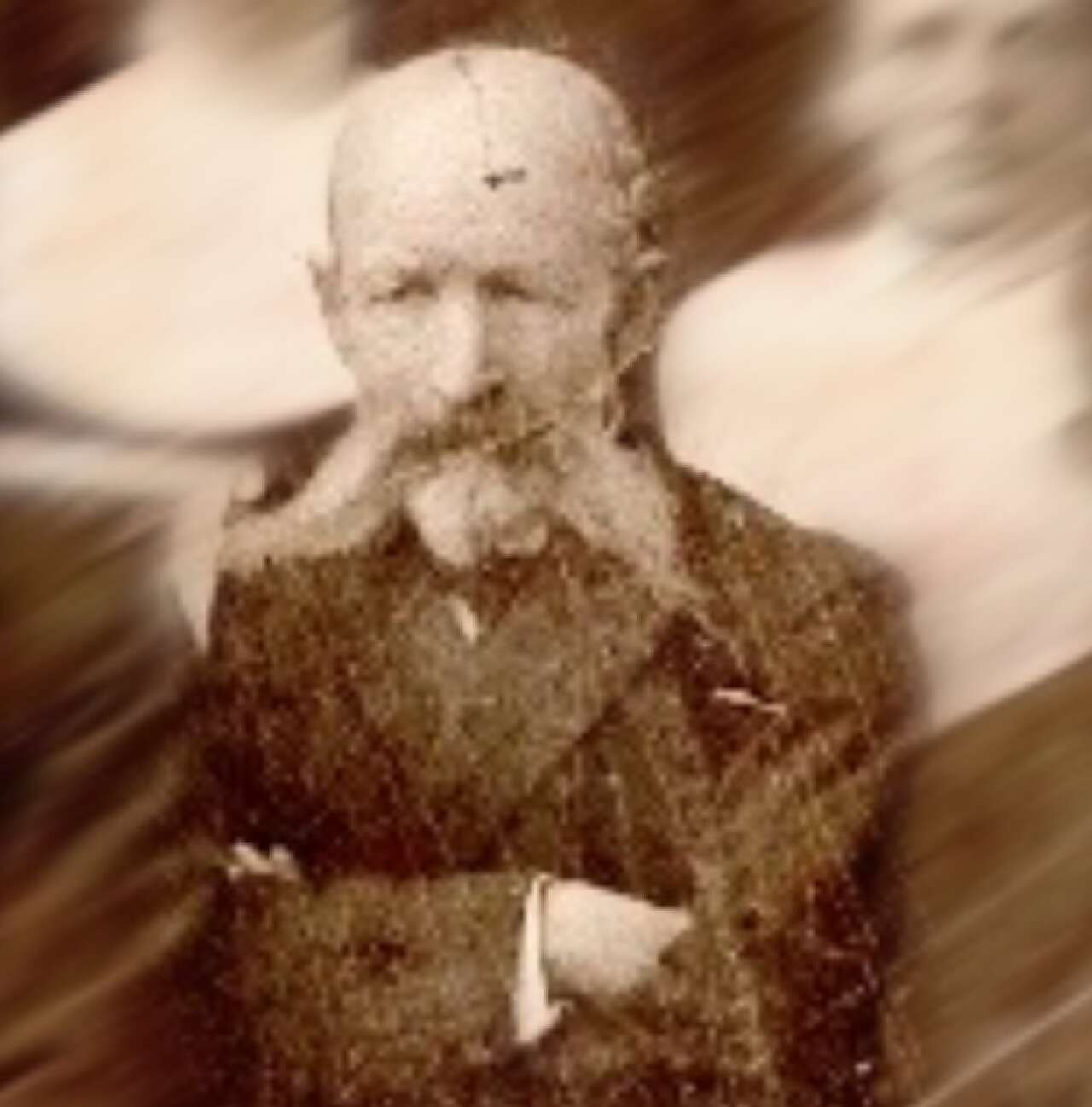
Stefan Stenzel among the Red Cross activists in 1915

During the First World War, Dr. Stenzel appears in the memoirs of Jadwiga, the daughter of the owner of the roof tile factory, A. Wimmer. It happened in the summer of 1917, when Russian army, fleeing from Kolomyia, burned down Wimmer's wooden villa in A. Tchaikovsky Street. At that time, Stefan Stenzel, Jadwiga's uncle, sheltered the entrepreneur's family for a while in the pharmacy building. Little Jadwiga remembered the moment when the pharmacist made cough drops: Stenzel poured thick honey-colored syrup onto a long table covered with tin, then, when the syrup solidified, he cut it into small cubes, making a net with a knife. These drops seemed very tasty to the child. During the war, his pharmacy was not damaged by Russian soldiers, as evidenced by the German-language newspaper "Pharmaceutische Post" of August 25, 1917.

Remaining the owner of the pharmacy in Kolomyia, in 1919 Stefan Stenzel moved to Lwów, where he bought the pharmacy at the building at Hetmanska Street, 8 from Josef Groblewski. Later, Stefan Stenzel moved it to the newly built Sprecher House on Mariacka Square in March 1922. On the ground floor of Stenzel's pharmacy, medicines were manufactured and sold, and on the first floor, the owner's family lived. Later, the family moved to a villa at what is now Konovaltsa Street, 100.

In May 1922, he became a member of the Pharmaceutical Chamber of Eastern Lesser Poland. In the late 1920s, he was the secretary of this society together with Dr. Otmar Tenecki.

In February 1929, he joined the management of the so-called "labor courts".

Stefan Stenzel was well-versed in the manufacture of cosmetic creams and other skin care products. Stefan Stenzel's patented Benignin face cream, designed to eliminate freckles and sunburn, which were undesirable at the time, was also a hit, and was popular at the time of the opening of the Lviv pharmacy, as it was created by Edward Stenzel, Stefan's father. The product was sold in small decorated porcelain vessels. Stenzel was the first in Lviv to separate the prescription department of the pharmacy from the over-the-counter department, as was done in Europe for the convenience of visitors.

In 1940, Stefan Stenzel and his family were deported from Kolomyia to Kazakhstan, and the pharmacies in Kolomyia and Lviv were nationalized. When, after two years in Kazakhstan, he heard about the formation of Anders' Army, he joined it, where he headed the Central Medical Supply. Unfortunately, a few days later, due to severe exhaustion, he fell ill with typhus and died. He is buried in the military cemetery in the city of Yangiyul in Uzbekistan with the rank of lieutenant colonel.

== Stenzel's hobby of cars ==
Dr. Stenzel began to be interested in cars while living in his hometown: he reported in an advertisement in the newspaper "Czas" on August 1, 1914, that in May he had made a tour from Kolomea to Vienna via the Dolomites, Bozen (Mendola Tonale), Milan, Genova, Nice (Col de Vars, Laure), Geneva, Bern, Schaffhausen, Munich, Nuremberg, Prague in a Benz car.

Stefan Stenzel also had the exclusive right to sell Mercedes cars. In October 1925, he became a member of the rallying team of the Małopolska Automobile Club, and in the late 1920s he was a member of the sports committee of this club. In June 1927, he took part in the First All-Polish Sports Exhibition in Lwów, where he presented a liquid that automatically vulcanized pneumatic defects while the car was moving.

== Preservation of Stenzel's pharmacy in Lviv ==
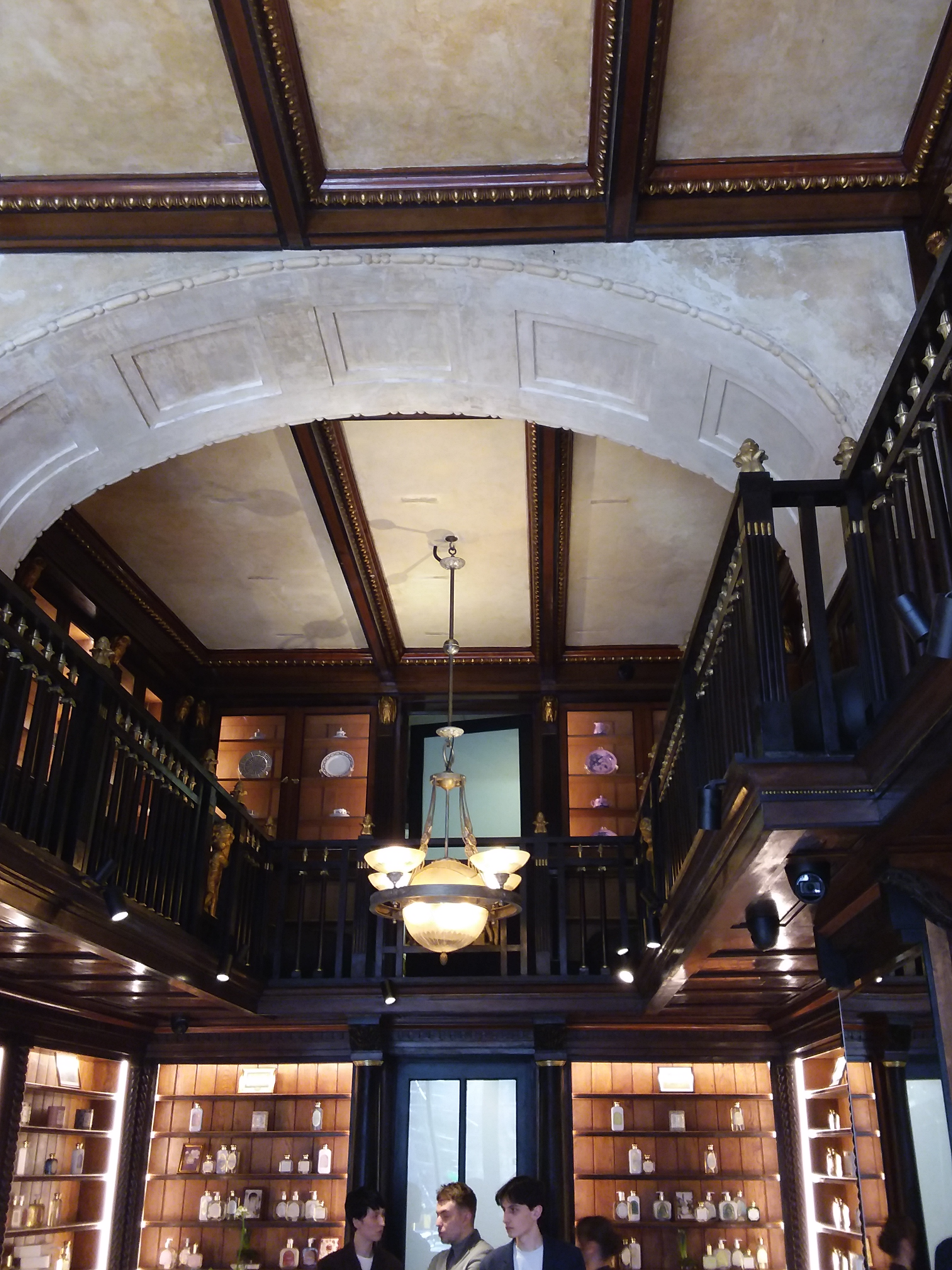
Interior of restored pharmacy of Stefan Stenzel in Lviv (2025)

During the Soviet era and the first years of Ukrainian independence, the pharmacy on Mariyska Square was the main homeopathic pharmacy in Lviv, and at the same time had a separate homeopathic department that served five regions of the western region of Ukraine, but the pharmacy has retained its old appearance. In 2019, the D. S pharmacy chain operated there, which restored many historical elements here, but closed three years later due to expensive rent.

On March 1, 2025, restorers were involved in the place of the old pharmacy, with the efforts and at the expense of the Symbol company, and a thorough restoration of the pharmacy was carried out, including every detail of the furniture, as well as communications, and even the authentic ceiling was restored. Now a place selling cosmetics and other health and beauty products "Symbol Stenzel", named after Stefan Stenzel, has opened here, which completely revives the original functionality of the historic pharmacy.
