= Hellén =

Hellén is a surname. Notable people with the surname include:

- Henrik Hellén (1939–1998), Finnish high jumper
- Immi Hellén, Finnish poet
- Wolter Edward Hellén, Finnish entomologist
