= Czeladź =

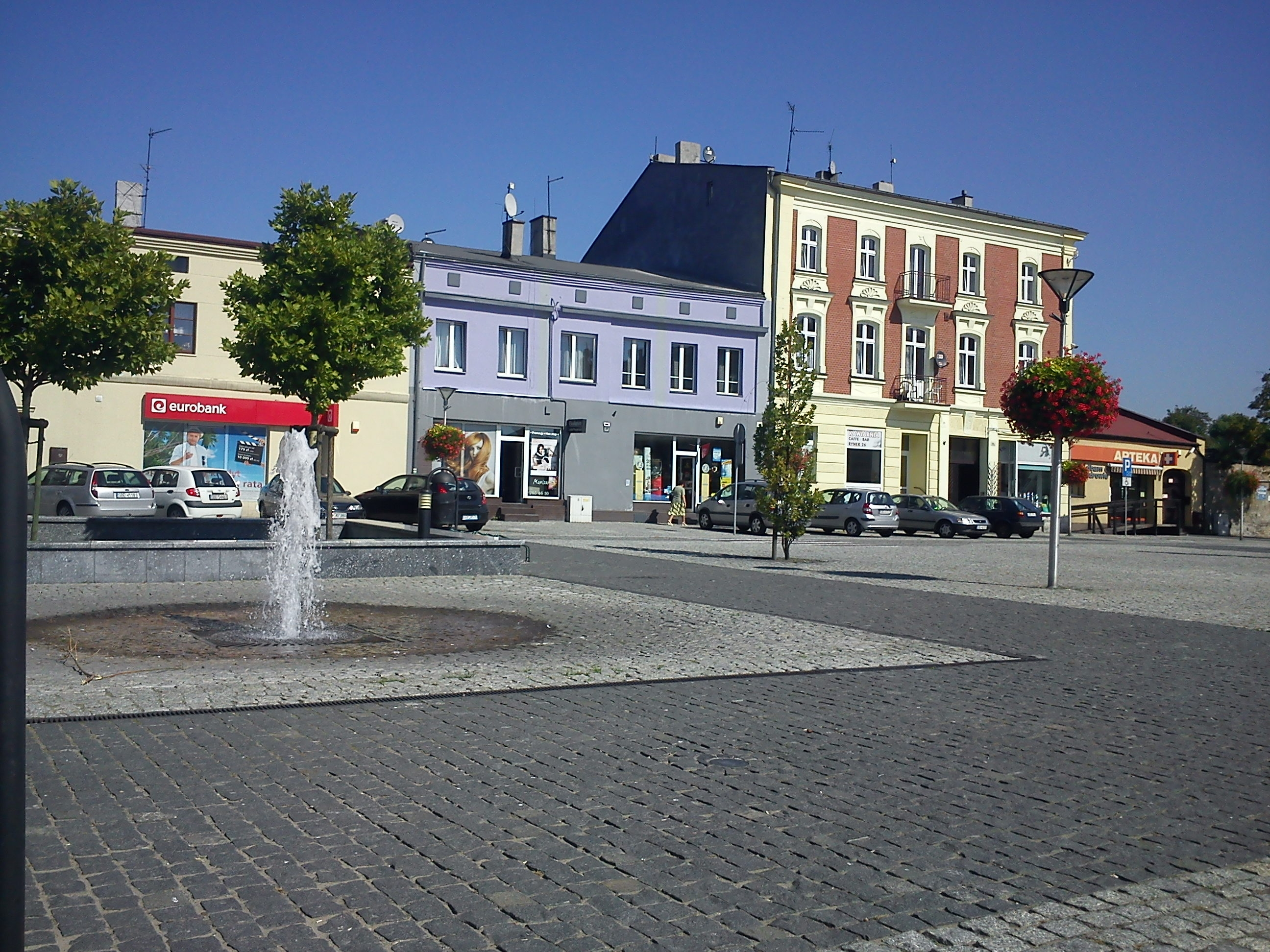
- Market Square in Czeladź

- Flag Coat of arms
- Interactive map of Czeladź
- Location within Poland
- Coordinates: 50°20′N 19°5′E
- Country: Poland
- Voivodeship: Silesian
- County: Będzin
- Gmina: Czeladź (urban gmina)
- First mentioned: 1228
- Town rights: 1262

Government
  - Mayor: Zbigniew Szaleniec

Area
  - City: 16.38 km^{2} (6.32 sq mi)

Population (31 December 2021)
  - City: 30,732
  - Density: 1,876/km^{2} (4,859/sq mi)
  - Urban: 2,746,000
  - Metro: 5,294,000
- Time zone: UTC+1 (CET)
  - Summer (DST): UTC+2 (CEST)
- Postal code: 41-250, 41-253 (Piaski suburb)
- Area code: +48 32
- Car plates: SBE
- Primary airport: Katowice Airport
- Website: www.czeladz.pl

Czeladź ([ˈt͡ʂɛlat͡ɕ]) is a town in Zagłębie Dąbrowskie (part of historic Lesser Poland), in southern Poland, near Katowice and Sosnowiec. Located in the Silesian Highlands, on the Brynica river (tributary of the Vistula), it is the oldest urban center of Zagłębie Dąbrowskie. The area of Czeladź is 16 km^{2} (6.2 sq mi), and it borders Będzin, Sosnowiec, Katowice and Siemianowice Śląskie.

The town is situated in the Silesian Voivodeship. Czeladź is one of the cities of the 2,7 million conurbation – Katowice urban area and within a greater Katowice-Ostrava metropolitan area populated by about 5,294,000 people. The population of the town as of December 2021 is 30,732.

Founded in the 13th century, Czeladź was granted city status in 1262. In the years 1434–1790, it belonged to the Duchy of Siewierz. In the 19th century, Czeladź became an important mining center, with the Saturn coal mine opened there in the late 19th century.

== History ==
=== Early history ===
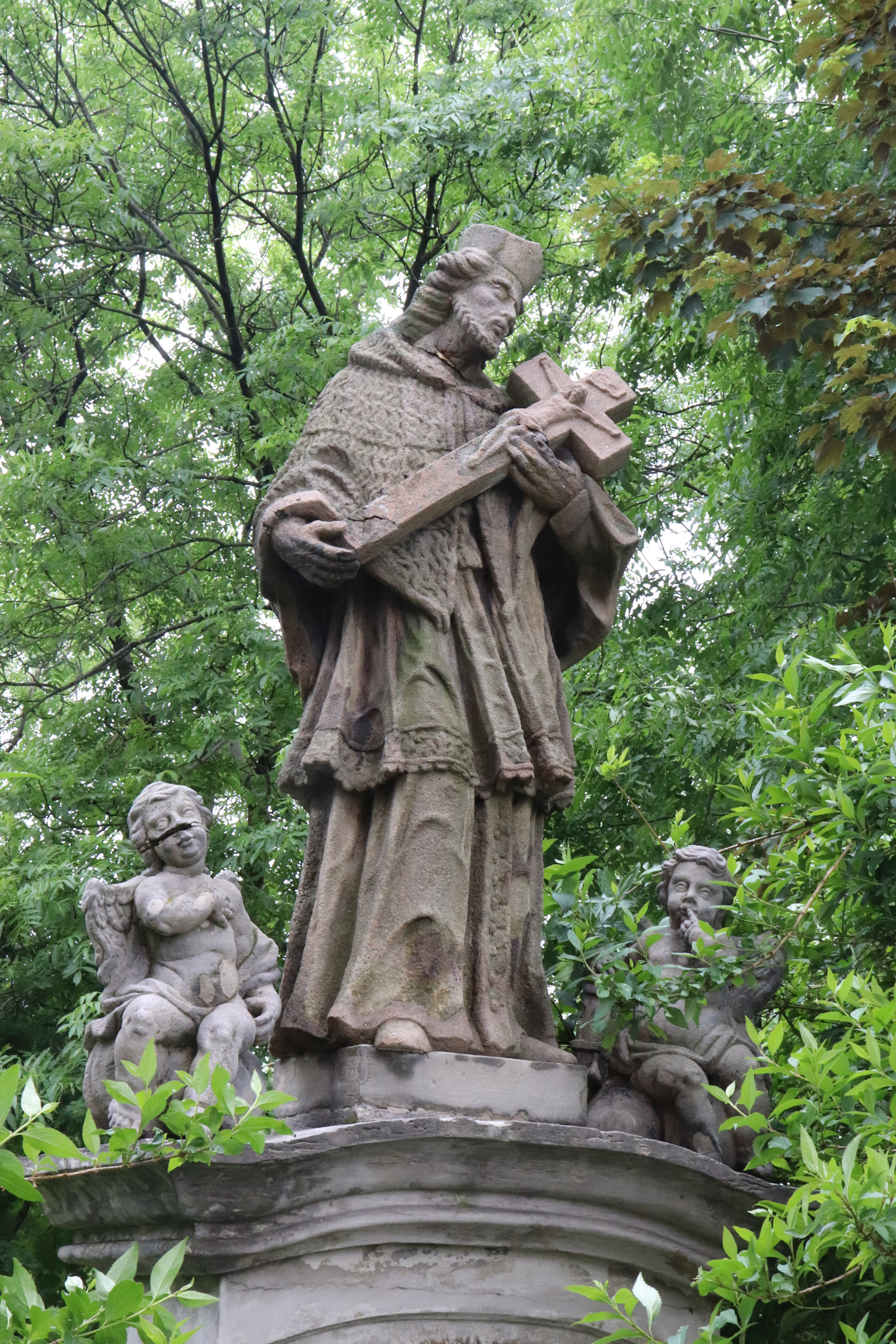
Baroque statue of Saint John of Nepomuk

First historic mention of Czeladź comes from 1228, in a bill of Duke Casimir I of Opole, in which the boundaries of the village were mentioned, a public house, as well as a bridge over the Brynica. In 1243, the village (spelled as Celad, and already having the status of a defensive gord) was mentioned again, this time in a document of Duke Konrad I of Masovia, as it had been destroyed in 1241, during the first Mongol invasion of Poland. It belonged to an abbey from Staniątki, and in 1260, Prince Władysław of Opole decided to purchase the village with its parish church. Two years later, Czeladź was sold to an abbey from Henryków, and was granted Magdeburg rights. The town remained within territory of Silesian duchies, but at the same time, Czeles, as it was known, was under the jurisdiction of bishops of Kraków.

In 1434 it became part of the Duchy of Siewierz, a property of Kraków Bishops. The town had a defensive wall, remains of which were discovered in 2006, and a town hall, where on March 9, 1589, the agreement between Poles and Austrians was signed, ending the War of the Polish Succession. Czeladź suffered much damage inflicted by the Swedes in the Deluge (1655–60).

=== Late modern period ===
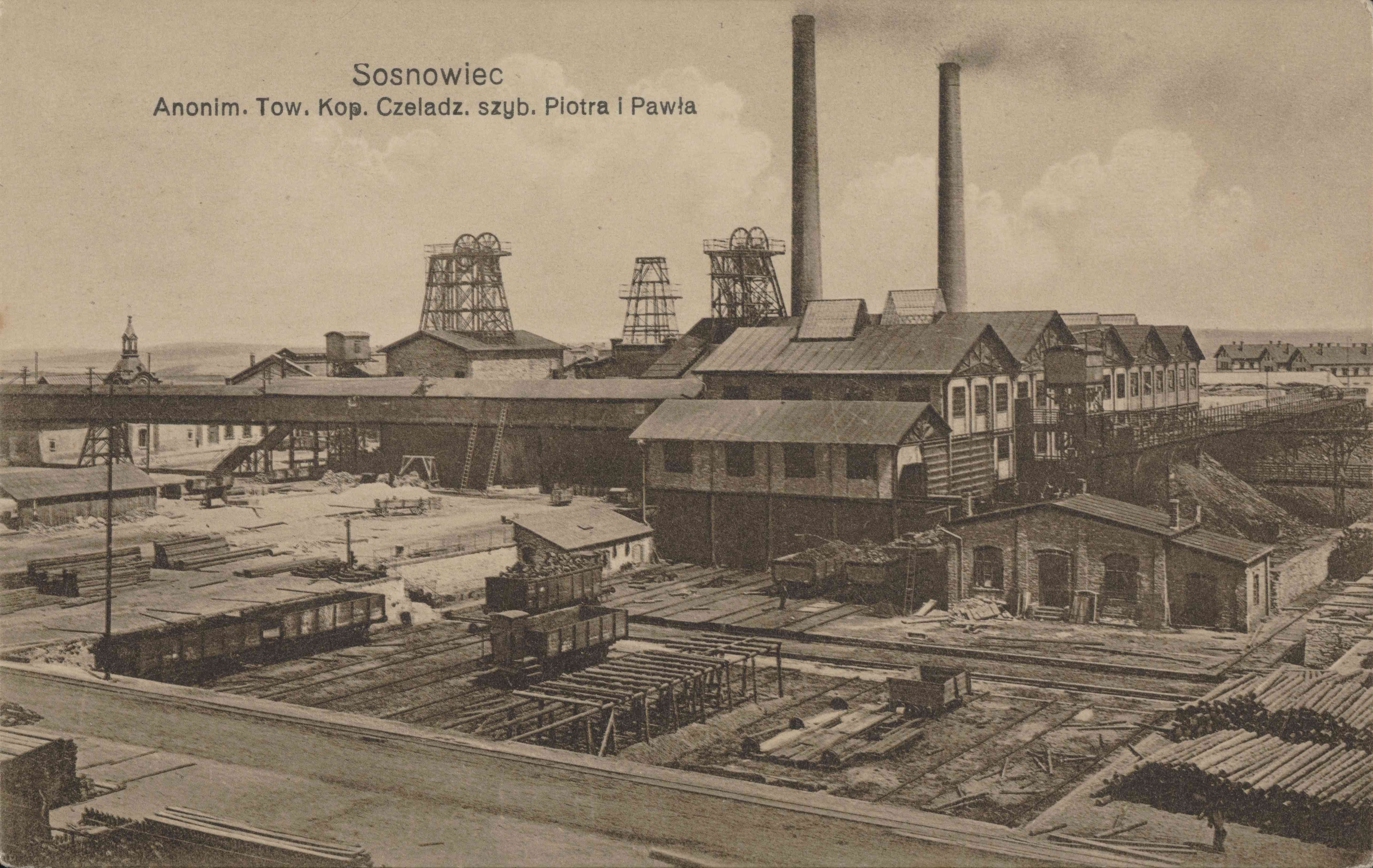
Czeladź Coal Mine in 1921

In 1790, the Duchy of Siewierz was incorporated directly into the Polish–Lithuanian Commonwealth, and King Stanisław August Poniatowski made Czeladź a free city. After the Partitions of Poland, Czeladź since 1815 belonged to the Russian-controlled Congress Poland, and was located on the border with Kingdom of Prussia's province of Silesia. During the January Uprising, in February 1863, Czeladź was briefly captured by Polish insurgents after their victory in the Battle of Sosnowiec nearby.

Since the 1860s, the town began to turn into an industrial center. Two coal mines were opened – Czeladź (1870), and Saturn (1880). Workers' settlements were built, and the dynamic growth was not stopped by World War I, when Czeladź was occupied by the German Empire. In 1915, a power plant was opened, and Czeladź became a magnet for farmers from overpopulated Lesser Poland's villages, who came here in search of work. Tenement houses replaced wooden huts, streets were paved and parks opened. Mining emerged as an engine of town's development.

After World War I, Poland regained independence and control of the town. In the 1921 census, 99.1% of the population declared Polish nationality and 0.6% declared Jewish nationality.

=== World War II ===
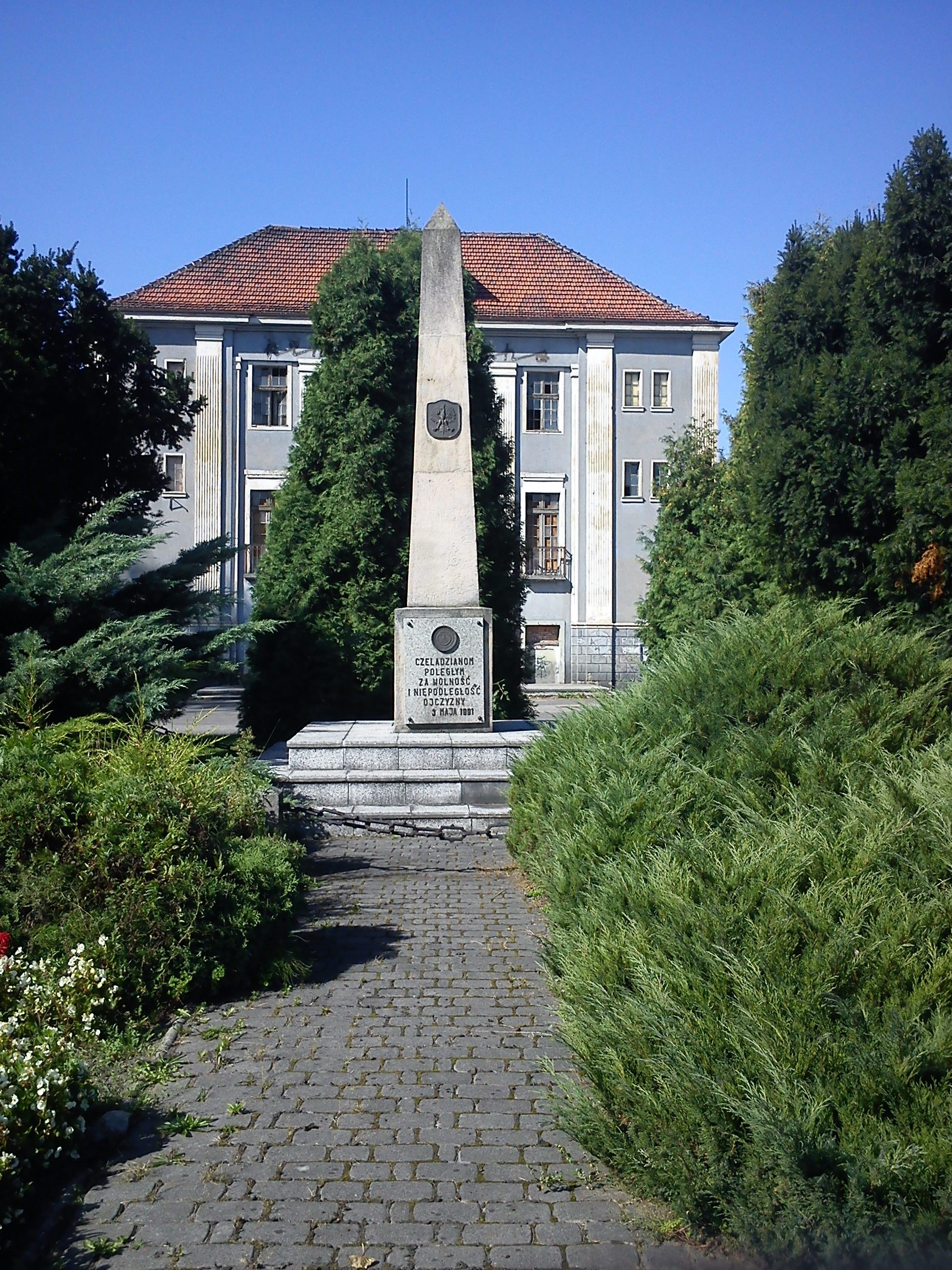
Memorial to locals fallen in fight for Poland's freedom and independence

Following the joint German-Soviet invasion of Poland, which started World War II in September 1939, the town was occupied by Germany until 1945. In September 1939, the German Einsatzgruppe I entered the town and would commit various atrocities against the population. Nearly all of Czeladź' Jewish community was murdered during the occupation. Jews numbered around 1,000, about 5% of the population, at the beginning of the war. The German invasion led to the immediate abuse, robbery, and murder of Jewish residents. 22 Polish policemen and 15 Polish military officers from Czeladź were murdered by the Russians in the large Katyn massacre in April–May 1940. In June 1940, both Poles and Polish Jews were forced to go to the town square where they were beaten and tortured as retaliation for the murder of a German. Afterwards, 20 of the Jews were detained and murdered. Polish hostages from Czeladź were among 20 Poles massacred by the Germans on July 16, 1940, in Olkusz. In 1941, the Germans forced Jews into a ghetto. Periodically, some were sent to forced labor camps. In May 1942, 200 residents of the ghetto were sent to Auschwitz. Most sent to Auschwitz were immediately murdered or died later from starvation, disease, and brutality. In May, 1943, the ghetto was "liquidated" with the last Jews sent to Będzin and then on to Auschwitz. Only 40 Czeladź Jews are thought to have survived Auschwitz, the labor camps, or by hiding in the area.

The Germans also established and operated three forced labor subcamps (E580, E587, E754) of the Stalag VIII-B/344 prisoner-of-war camp for Allied POWs in the town. In 1944, the Germans sent kidnapped Polish children from Czeladź to the Potulice concentration camp.

=== Recent history ===
In the Polish People's Republic, Czeladź kept its industrial position. Coal resources, however, became depleted and mines, starting in the 1960s, would make their workers redundant. Since the notion of unemployment did not officially exist in a Communist country, new companies were opened for the dismissed miners – Transport Company Transbud (1969), Energy Company Energopol (1970), and Window Manufacturer Erg (1971).

In the mid-1970s, a number of blocks of flats was built in Czeladź, to accommodate an influx of workers employed at the construction of Katowice Steelworks. From 1975 to 1998, it was administratively located in the Katowice Voivodeship.

== Sights ==
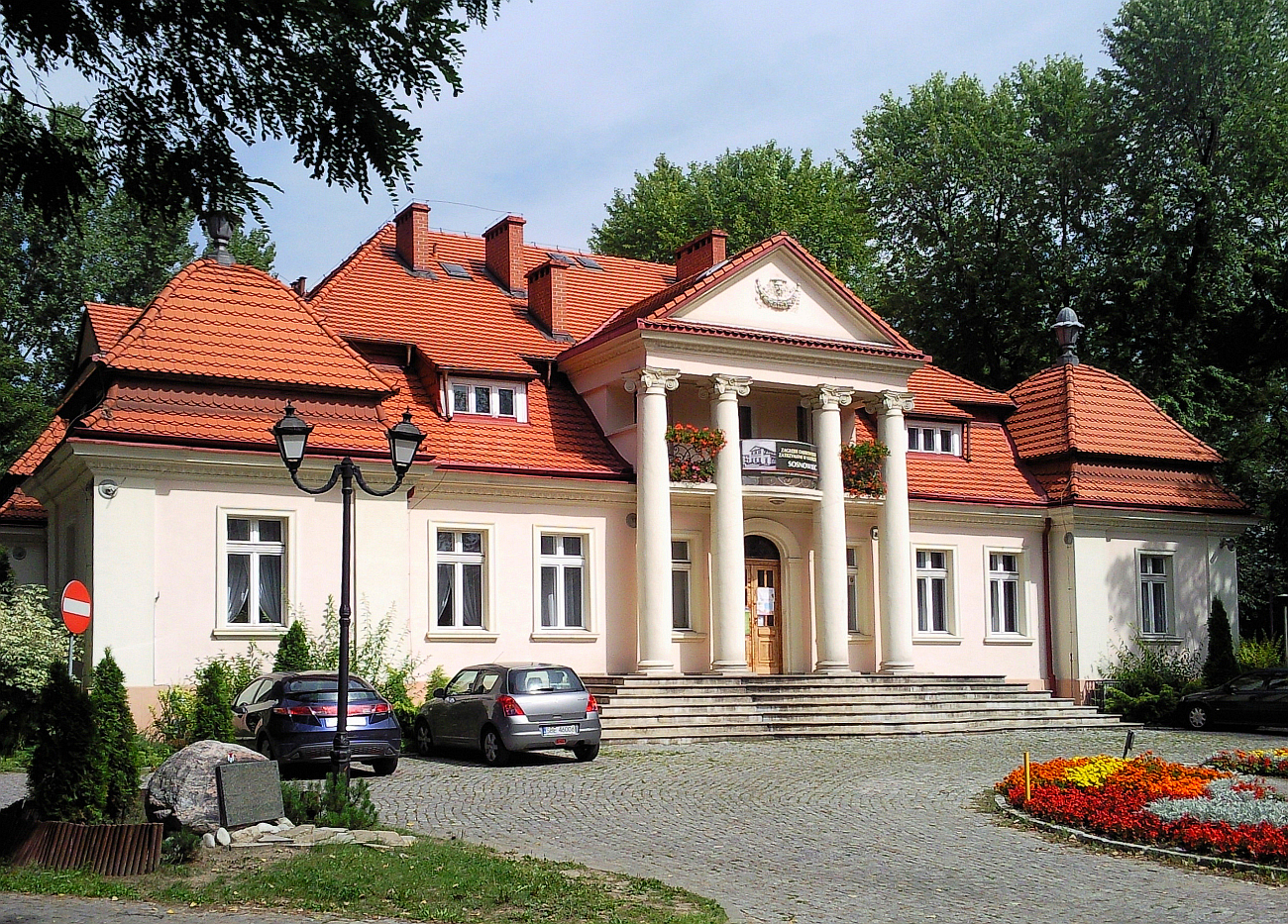
Saturn Museum

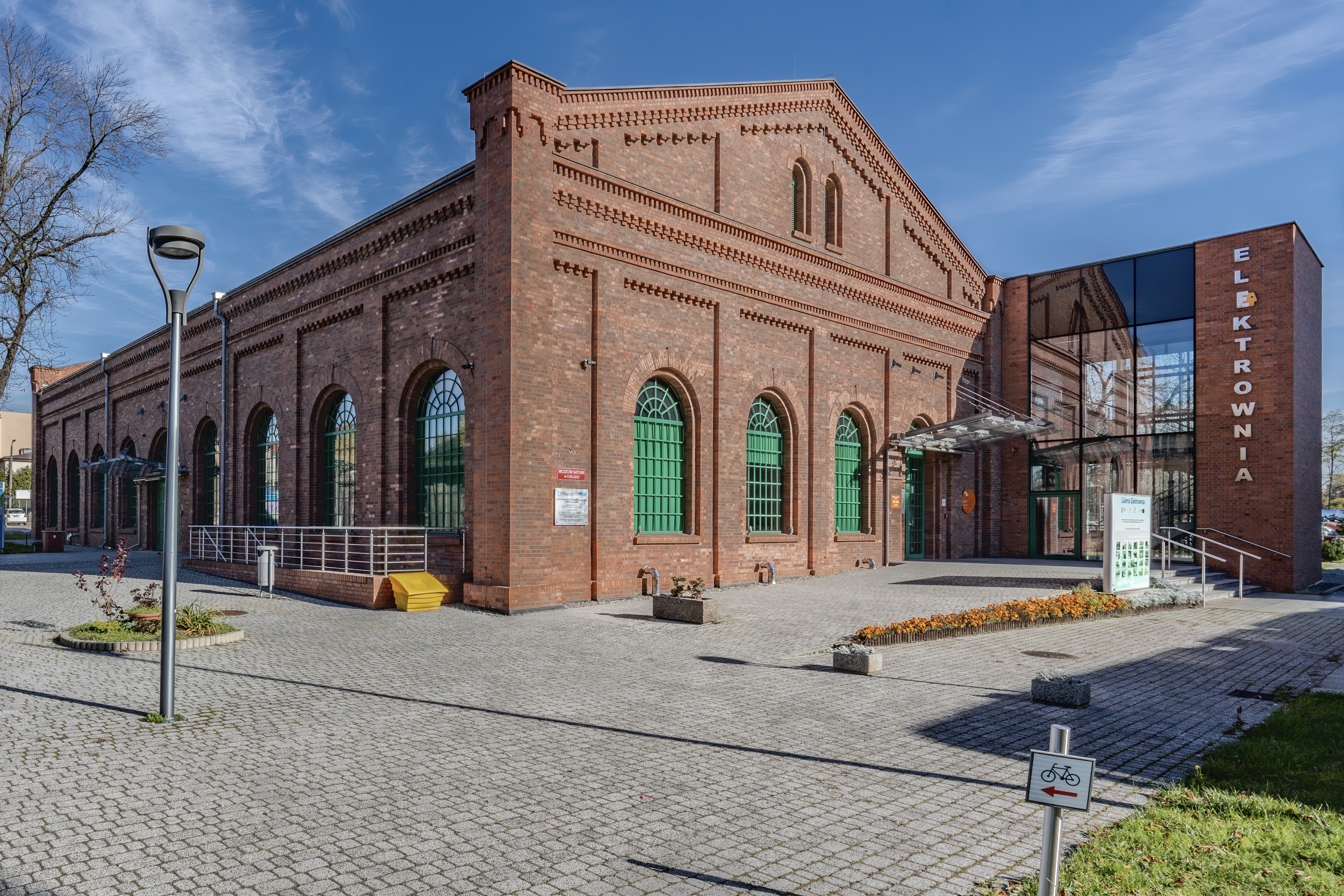
Elektrownia Modern Art Gallery

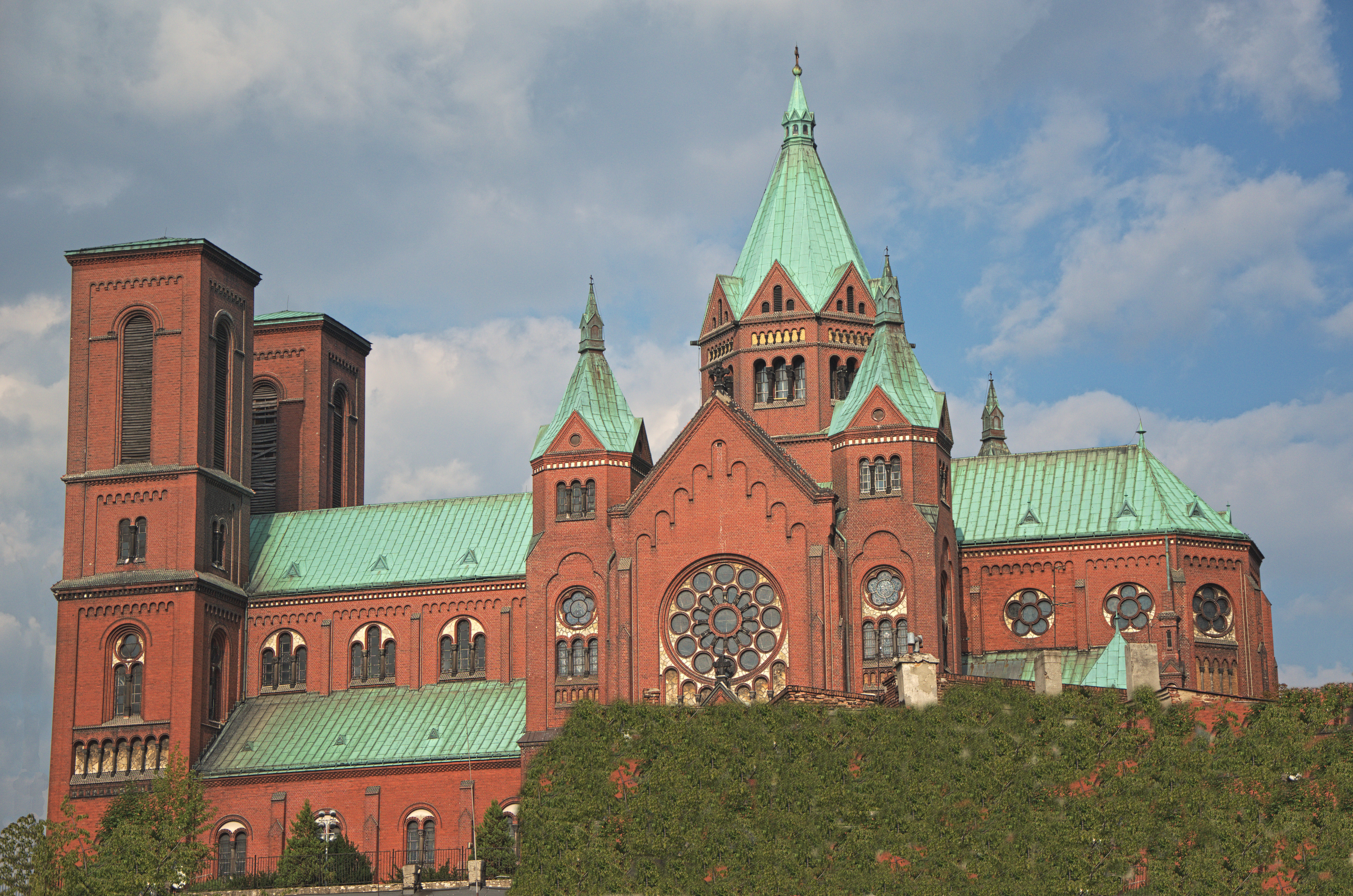
Saint Stanislaus Church

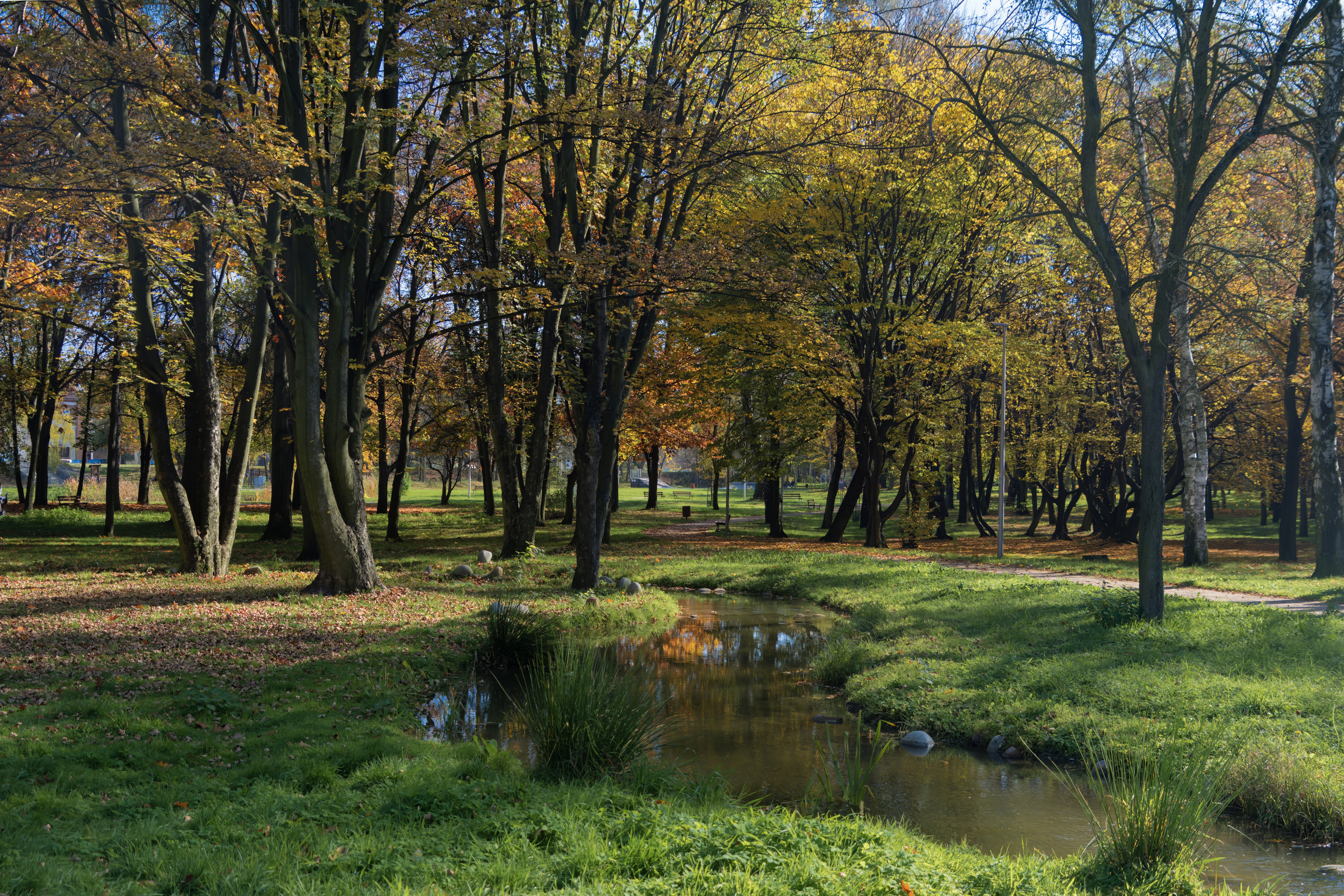
Park Grabek

Among points of interest there are:

- Romanesque Revival church of St. Stanislaus Bishop and Martyr, with the 1637 organs and 17th century chalices,
- medieval structure of the center of the town,
- former Polish Brethren church (first half of the 17th century),
- Elektrownia Modern Art Gallery,
- Park Grabek, the largest municipal park,
- houses from the 18th and 19th centuries,
- historic miners’ settlement in the district of Piaski,
- neo-Classicistic palace Pod Filarami (1924), now the Saturn Museum.

== Transport ==
The Polish National roads 86 and 94 run through the town, and several other national roads and the A1 and A4 highways run nearby, within the metropolitan area.

== Sports ==
The local football club is CKS Czeladź. It competes in the lower leagues.

== Notable people ==
- Aryeh Tzvi Frumer (1884–1943), Rav of Koziegłowy
- Shlomo Sztencl (1884–1919), Rav of the town in 1905–1910
- Abraham Nahum Stencl (1897–1983), Ashkenazi poet
- Czesław Słania (1921–2005), postage stamp engraver
- Jan Dydak (1968–2019), boxer, Olympic medalist
- Aleksandra Gajewska (born 1971), theatre director, actress, and politician
- Adrian Siemieniec (born 1992), football manager

== Twin towns – sister cities ==
Czeladź is twinned with:

- Auby, France
- Várpalota, Hungary
- Viesīte, Latvia
- Zhydachiv, Ukraine
