= Pam Stenzel =

American speaker

Pam Stenzel (born 1965) is an American speaker known for lecturing to young people about abstinence-only sex education. She has been described as "one of the country's most established abstinence-only lecturers," and speaks to more than half a million young people every year around the world.

== Education ==
Stenzel was conceived when her mother was allegedly raped at the age of fifteen. Her mother then gave Stenzel up for adoption, and was adopted by a Baptist family. She attended Liberty University, from which she received a degree in psychology.

== Career ==
Stenzel began her career counseling young women at crisis pregnancy centers, and served as the director of Alpha Women's Center in Prior Lake, Minnesota for years. Her website states that after working at these centers, she realized that many of the women who came there were unaware of the risks associated with sex and birth control, and so decided to become a public speaker. Stenzel was received into the Catholic Church in 2005.

== Controversy ==
In 2013, Stenzel spoke at George Washington High School in Charleston, West Virginia. Her talk there generated controversy when a seventeen-year-old student, Katelyn Campbell, complained about Stenzel's talk, which she described as "slut-shaming". Allegedly, the school's principal responded to this by threatening to tell the school Campbell wanted to attend, Wellesley College, about her "bad character". Campbell appeared on 20/20 to criticize Stenzel's talk, saying that Stenzel's tone was "combative" and that "I think there's a better, more scientific way to address sex than saying, Just don't do it."
