= Casa Erbo Stenzel =

Historic building in Curitiba, Brazil

Coordinates: 25.383848°S 49.265483°W

Casa Erbo Stenzel was a historic building in the city of Curitiba, Brazil.

== History ==
The wooden building was the residence of sculptor Erbo Stenzel and some time after his death, the family donated to the municipality administration, in addition to the house, belongings of the artist's work, such as plaster molds, models and replicas of character busts.

The house was moved from its original location (in the São Francisco neighborhood) and after being cleared, it was reassembled inside Parque São Lourenço. On June 22, 1998, it was inaugurated as a museum, which had a bibliographic collection, studies and documents by the artist and chess player, in addition to donated material. On August 26, 2009, the Cultural Foundation of Curitiba closed the site with the intention of carrying out a major renovation. The entire collection was removed from the museum and placed in the care of the government of the State of Paraná . It was subsequently left empty without receiving the planned renovations.

In the early hours of June 14, 2017, the historic house caught fire and only its porch was not consumed by the flames. In the same week, the then mayor, Rafael Greca, authorized the complete demolition of what was left of the house.
