= Edward Stenzel =

Polish pharmacist

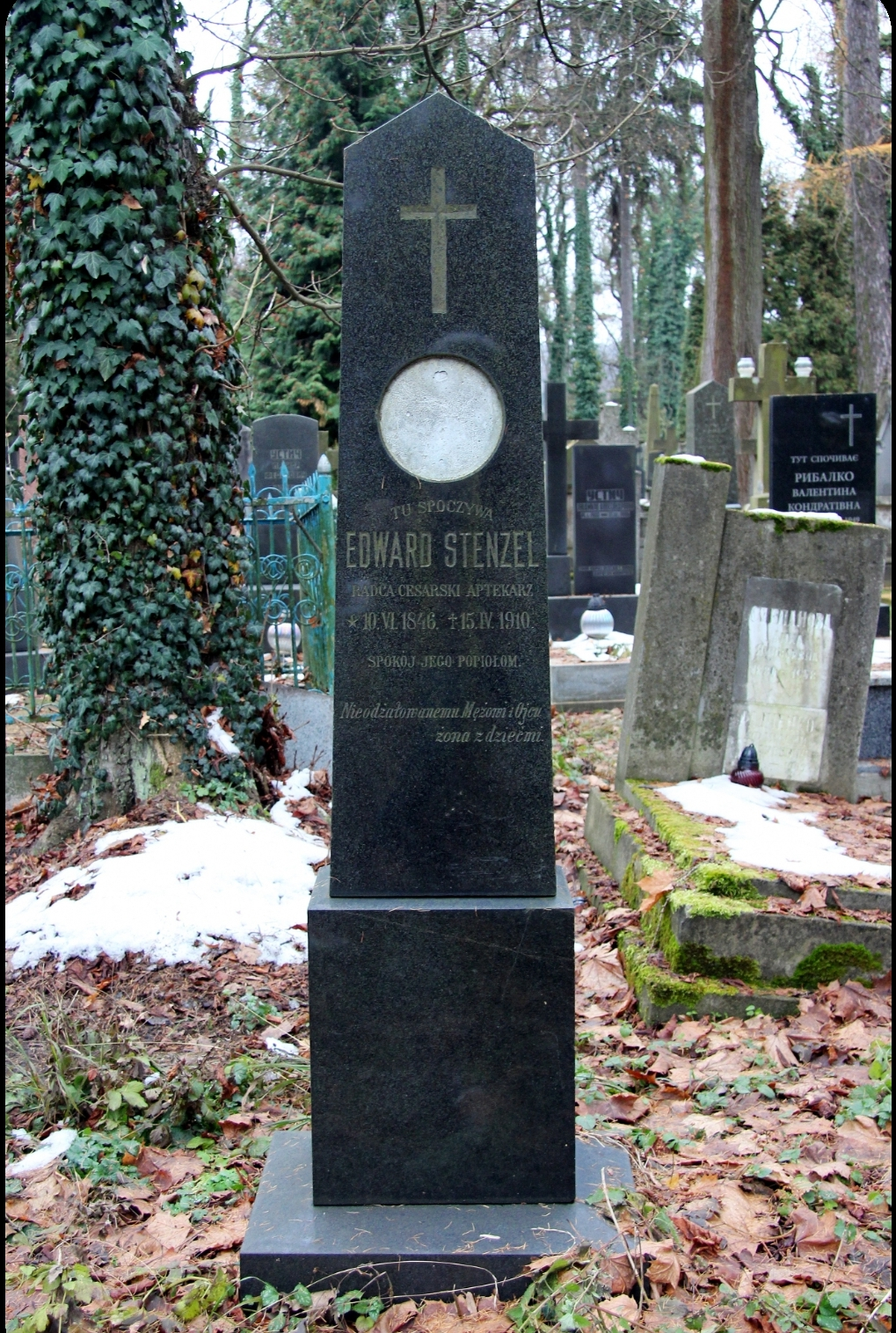
- Born: 10 June 1846; Gorlice, Austrian Empire
- Died: 15 April 1910 (aged 63); Lemberg, Austria-Hungary
- Citizenship: Austria-Hungary
- Education: University of Lwów
- Occupations: Pharmacist, businessperson
- Years active: 1874-1910
- Spouse: Yulia Vex
- Children: Stefan Stenzel; Edward Stenzel Jr.
- Awards: Aptekarski radcy cesarski (1898)

Edward Antoni Stenzel (10 June 1846 – 15 April 1910) was the Polish pharmacist from Kolomyia, businessperson and cavalier of the state title "Aptekarski radcy cesarski" (1898). He was a father of the famous pharmacist from Kolomyia and Lviv Stefan Stenzel.

== Biography ==
According to the registry book (marriage) of St. Anthony's Church in Lviv, Edward Stenzel was born on June 10, 1846, in the city of Gorlice in the Austrian Empire.

It is currently unknown where exactly Edward Stenzel studied, however, according to the German newspaper "Pharmaceutische Post" of March 19, 1899, he began practicing pharmacy in 1862.

Later, according to the newspaper "Czasopismo Galicyjskiego Towarzystwa Aptekarskiego" of May 1, 1910, he studied at the Chemistry Department of the Faculty of Philosophy of the Francis I University of Lviv, finishing a master's degree of pharmacy on July 23, 1869.

On November 11, 1874, he became a permanent member of the Pharmaceutical Society. In the same year, he became the owner of a pharmacy in the village of Boyany in Bukovyna.

In 1875, he bought a pharmacy in Kolomyia from Maximilian Nowitski, renovated it, and opened it to future customers in July of the following year, as evidenced by the newspaper "Ruska Rada" of August 1, 1876 (old style). The announcement of the opening of the pharmacy stated that it offered pharmaceutical products from the "first" factories, as well as its own production, homeopathic and hygiene products, various types of mineral water, etc. The pharmacy even sent medicines by mail with payment upon receipt. Stenzel's pharmacy first appeared in the Polish press in the newspaper "Gazeta Lwowska" of October 14, 1876, where it was reported about the sale of the Viennese hair rejuvenation product "Puritas" in the pharmacy in Kolomyia.

In February 1889, he built a tenement house near the town hall and renovated the pharmacy that was located there. On July 17 of the same year, he became a member of the County Sickness Fund. In June 1892, Edward Stenzel was accused of so-called "germanization": the pharmacist wrote his bills for medicines in German language on Polish forms, even to Polish debtors. However, a few days later, the local press denied everything, explaining that Stenzel had actually issued this bill in German language, since he had not received any response to his repeated requests to pay this bill in Polish, and therefore he had good reason to believe that the addressee did not speak this language. The newspaper also explained that the pharmacist had received several orders to issue the relevant medicines in German language.

As early as 1890, Edward Stenzel introduced the Carpathian potion, which was effective for congestive cough, hoarseness, phlegm, chest pain, tonsillitis, etc. In 1894, he participated in the General National Exhibition in Lviv, where he presented the technology of extracting herbs grown in the Carpathian Mountains for the production of potions. Edward Stenzel was awarded the silver medal of the General National Exhibition for his technology.

For his pharmaceutical activity, on December 2, 1898, he was awarded the title of Imperial Pharmaceutical Advisor (pol. - Aptekarskie radcy cesarski) on the occasion of the fiftieth anniversary of the reign of Emperor Franz Joseph.

Edward Stenzel died on April 15, 1910 in Lemberg and was buried at the Lychakiv Cemetery.

== Public and political activity ==
Back in 1876, he began his public and political activities in Kolomyia: by the decision of the District Court on May 4, 1876, he became the deputy cashier of the "Society Registered with Unlimited Guarantee" instead of Mauritis Glowatsky.

In 1877, he became an ordinary member of the local branch of the Tatra Society. In 1884, by the decision of the District Court on November 6 of the same year, he became a co-owner of the company "Yinoenz, Stenzel i Liśkiewicz, fabryka i handel nafty w Sopowie", intended for oil trade. In 1886, after the Great Fire in Stryi, he donated 5 golden rhine coins to the restoration of the city.

In the early 1890s, he became a member of the board of the Trade, Agricultural, and Industrial Society together with Konstanta Rubella and Franciszek Vincenz. On April 30, 1892, he became a member of the supervisory board of the Agricultural and Industrial Trade Union. He was also a member of the "Polska Bursa", a student youth association.

In February 1899, Edward Stenzel was one of the organizers of the presidium of the general meeting of citizens of the city of Kolomyia, where they expressed unconfidence in the magistrate and the city council in power at that time. The following year, he signed an appeal to the city council regarding the integrity of the elections of deputies to the magistrate.

During his long professional career, the pharmacist held the positions of advisor and assessor of the city of Kolomyia for a certain period of time, and for many years was a civil judge and censor of the Austro-Hungarian Bank.

== Awards and honors ==
- Silver medal of the General National Exhibition in Lviv (1894) - for the invention of the technology of drying Carpathian herbs for potions.
- Title of Imperial Pharmaceutical Advisor (2.12.1898)
