= Hellen (given name) =

Hellen is a feminine given name. Notable people with the given name include:

== People ==
- Hellen Adoa, Ugandan parliamentarian
- Hellen Asamo, Ugandan teacher
- Hellen Baleke (born 1987), Ugandan amateur boxer
- Hellen Boering (born 1964), Dutch-born water polo goalkeeper
- Hellen M. Brooks, American educator and politician
- Hellen Chanda (born 1998), Zambian football forward
- Hellen Chepngeno (born 1967), Kenyan-born cross country runner
- Hellen Escobar, Colombian weightlifter
- Hellen Hedemann, Danish politician and lawyer
- Hellen Huisman, Dutch voice actor
- Hellen Kahunde, Ugandan educator and politician
- Hellen Kariuki (born 1992), Kenyan para powerlifter
- Hellen Kimaiyo (born 1968), Kenyan-born runner
- Hellen Jemaiyo Kimutai (born 1977), Kenyan marathon runner
- Hellen Cherono Koskei (born 1984), Kenyan long-distance runner
- Hellen Linkswiler (1912–1984), American nutrition scientist
- Hellen Ekalale Lobun (born 1999), Kenyan long-distance and cross-country runner
- Hellen Lossi, former First Lady of Guatemala
- Hellen Makumba (born 1996), Zambian runner
- Hellen van Meene, Dutch photographer
- Hellen Mubanga (born 1995), Zambian football forward
- Hellen Mugo (born 1985), Kenyan long-distance runner
- Hellen Murshali, South Sudanese politician and social worker
- Hellen Obiri (born 1989), Kenyan middle- and long-distance runner
- Hellen Obura, Ugandan judge
- Hellen Sander (born 1954), Canadian cross-country skier
- Hellen Saohaga (born 1987), Solomon Islander shot putter
- Hellen Stirk, Scottish martyr
- Hellen Syombua (born 1997), Kenyan runner
- Hellen Toncio (born 1994), Chilean volleyball player and beauty pageant titleholder
- Hellen Auma Wandera, Ugandan politician

== Fictional characters ==
- Hellen Gravely, fictional hotel owner in the 2019 action-adventure game Luigi's Mansion 3

== See also ==
- Helen (given name)
