= Mishnah Yomis =

Torah study cycle in which two Mishnahs are learned every day

In Judaism, Mishnah Yomis or Mishnah Yomit (Hebrew: משנה יומית "The Daily Study of the Mishnah") refers to the Torah study cycle in which two Mishnahs (brief collections of discussions and rulings dealing with the Oral Torah) are learned every day. It takes about 6 years to study all six tractates of the Mishnah using this learning cycle. Previous cycles of the Mishnah Yomis began on 22 Tamuz 5770 (July 4, 2010), and 20 Adar-B 5776 (March 30, 2016). The current cycle began on Shabbat, 21 Tevet 5782 (December 25, 2021).

== History ==
The Mishna Yomis learning cycle was first established in 1948 by Rabbi Yonah Sztencl. His goal in creating the Mishnah Yomis cycle was to memorialize the Jews that were killed in the Holocaust, through a global studying of the Mishnah. He also wanted to provide a realistic way for even a simple, working Jew to familiarize himself with the six orders of the Mishnah, upon which the Jewish system of law is based. In just 6 years, anyone can learn the entire set of 4,192 Mishnah.

== Other programs ==
In 1938 Aryeh Tzvi Frumer initiated a daily Mishna-study program, linked to Daf Yomi; see § Rav and rosh yeshiva there.

In 2020, Rabbi Yitzchak Silman, the grandson of Rabbi Shtenzel and one of the leaders of the Kviuta organization for the study of the Mishnah and the daily Halacha, initiated the Mishnatit (Mishnosis) program - covering all six sidrei mishna in a single year.

== See also ==
- Learn the Daily Mishnah Yomis online.
- List of masechtot, chapters, mishnahs and pages in the Talmud
- Other study cycles under Torah study § Study cycles

== Sources ==
- www.dafyomi.co.il/
