= Erbo Stenzel =

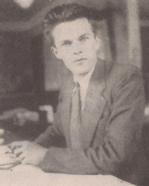
Erbo Stenzel in 1938

Erbo Stenzel (born in Paranaguá, on December 17, 1911 - died in Curitiba on July 23, 1980) was a plastic artist and sculptor from Paraná, Brazil. Stenzel crafted numerous monuments and busts of political and local personalities in Paraná.

== Biography overview ==
Stenzel was born in 1911 to parents, João and Maria Stenzel, of German and Austrian descent. The couple had eight children – four girls and four boys.

As a child, he studied at the Deutsche Shüle (German School). Stenzel began his training in the field of plastic arts with Frederico Lange de Morretes and later João Turin. In Rio de Janeiro, he attended the National School of Fine Arts and the Lyceum of Arts and Crafts.

Throughout his life, for reasons of survival, he did not dedicate himself exclusively to the visual arts. He worked at Machine Cottons Limited from 17 January 1927 to 31 June 1930, at the Furniture and Pictures Factory of Gerd Claassen and Kaminski, he was a modeler from 1 November 1933 to 24 December 1934. He also worked at the Department of Lands and Colonization, as an assistant draftsman, from September 1936 until February 1939, when he resigned and moved to Rio de Janeiro to dedicate himself to his studies.

He settled in Rio de Janeiro for approximately 10 years, a period in which he deepened his studies as a sculptor and later as an engraver, returning to Curitiba in 1949 to teach at the School of Music and Fine Arts of Paraná, temporarily assuming the chair of Artistic Anatomy and Physiology as a professor, having been hired in September 1968. He was also hired by the Secretary of Education and Culture, as inspector of students at the Institute of Education in May 1950.

The training process of new artists dedicated to sculptural art was hampered by the lack of a studio with its own dimensions for the development of activities related to this art. In 1950, he set up his studio on Rua Nilo Peçanha.

Between producing his artistic works and teaching, Erbo also dedicated his time to studying chess, which earned him many awards and recognition in this area. His interest in the visual arts transcended his own production and can be seen in the abundant documentation he gathered on the artistic activities of his contemporaries, such as: Zaco Paraná, João Turin, Lange de Morretes, Poty Lazzarotto and students such as Jair Mendes, Abraão Assad, Fernando Fast, among others.

In 1971, when paralysis compromised his autonomy, Stenzel left the house where he lived to live at Lar Dona Ruth, later being transferred to Lar Betesda of the Mennonite Christian Association, where he died on July 23, 1980.

On June 22, 1998, Casa Erbo Stenzel was inaugurated a museum designed to keep the artist's biographical collection.

== Awards ==
He received invitations to participate, as a jury, in art salons, including:

- II Salon of Visual Arts for Young People (1958);
- 52nd National Salon of Fine Arts (1947);
- 9th Paraná Fine Arts Salon (1952);
- 14* Spring Salon of Fine Arts (1962).

== Bibliography ==
- Catálogo - "O Auto-Retrato na Pintura Paranaese" - MAP
- Araújo, Maria Adalice de. Dicionário das Artes Plásticas no Paraná. Curitiba: Edição do author, 2006
- PIRES, Angela Ceccatto. Boletim Informativo da Casa Romário Martins, Erbo Stenzel. Curitiba: Fundação Cultural de Curitiba, v15, n°82. 1988
