= Shlomo Sztencl =

Polish Rabbi, Rabbinical Judge, and Rosh Yeshiva

Rabbi Shlomo Sztencl
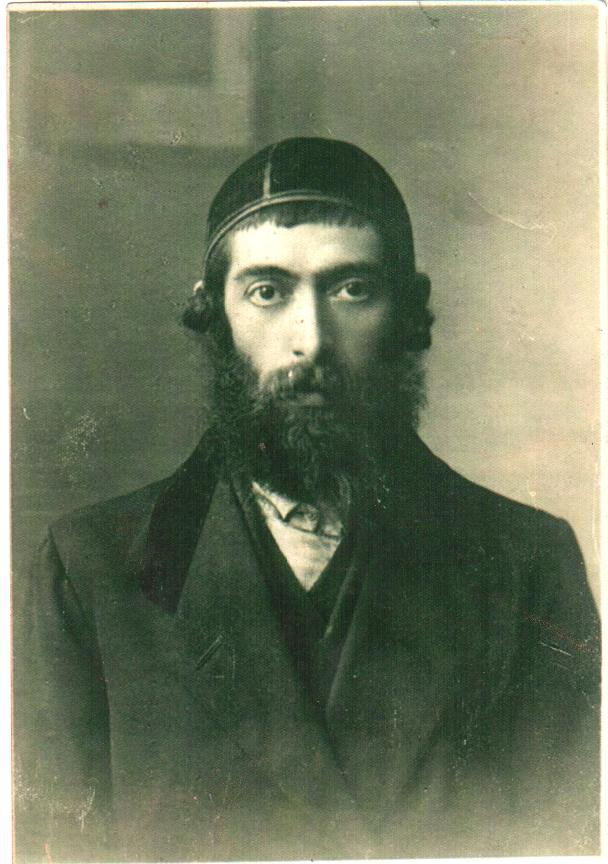
- Chief Rabbi of Czeladź, Poland; Rav of Sosnowiec, Poland

Personal life
- Born: Shlomo Sztencl; August 16, 1884 Czeladź, Congress Poland
- Died: August 31, 1919 (aged 35)
- Spouse: Miriam Bayla Zweigenhaft
- Children: Yonah Sztencl; Ester Sztencl
- Parent(s): Rabbi Chaim Dov Sztencl; Freidel Genendel Shweitzer

Religious life
- Religion: Judaism
- Denomination: Orthodox

Shlomo Sztencl (Hebrew: שלמה שטנצל, pronounced [ˈʃlomo ˈʃtentsel]; August 16, 1884 – August 31, 1919) was a Polish Orthodox Jewish rabbi. He served as Chief Rabbi of Czeladź, Congress Poland and Rav, dayan, and rosh yeshiva of Sosnowiec, Poland. He is the author of Koheles Shlomo and Beis Shlomo, the former published posthumously.

== Family background ==
Sztencl was born on 16 August 1884 (25 Av 5644) in Czeladź, Poland to Chaim Dov (Berish) Sztencl of Czeladź, a Radomsker hasidic rabbi.

Sztencl had one brother, the Yiddish poet Avraham Nochum, and two sisters, Esther and Tsime.

== Biography ==
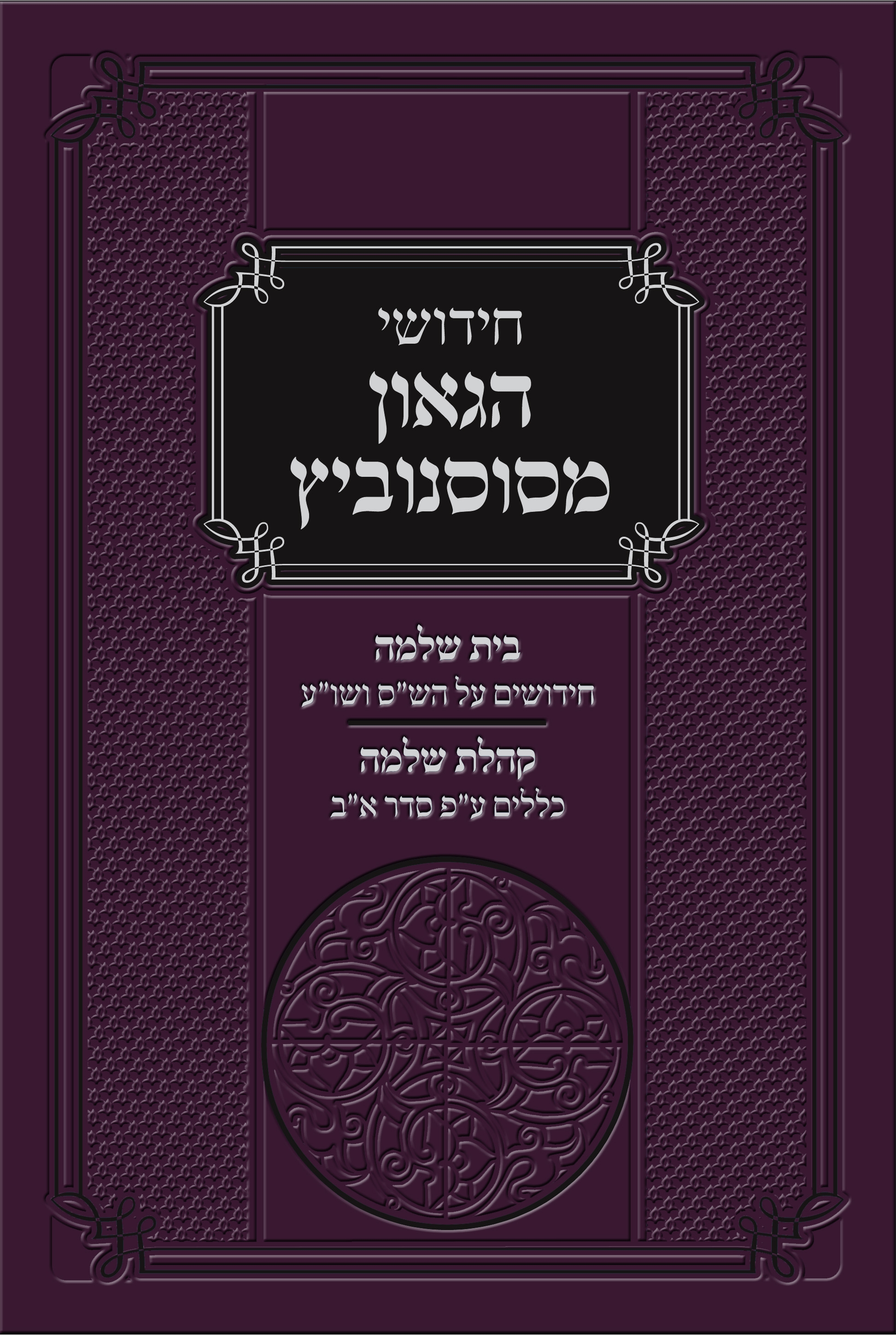
Front cover of Torah Novellae of the Genius From Sosnowiec, comprising Sztencl's two works, Beis Shlomo and Koheles Shlomo.

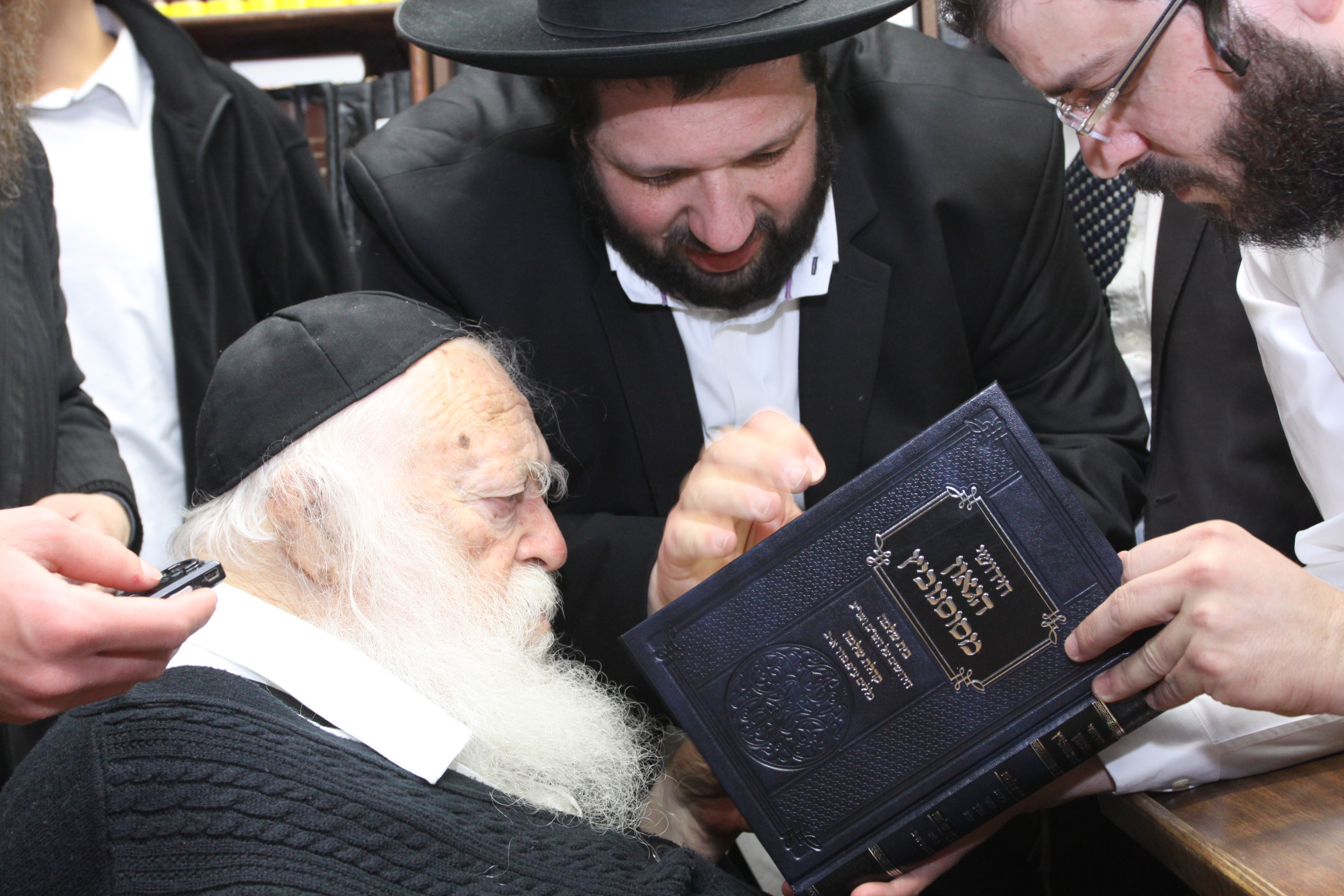
Chaim Kanievsky looking at the book

In 1897, several months before his bar mitzvah, Shlomo traveled to Berzeznitz to study with its Chief Rabbi, Yaakov Yosef HaCohen Rabinovitch, author of Emes LeYaakov. Several months later, when Rabinovitch was appointed Chief Rabbi of Klabotsk, he took Sztencl with him. After for a year and a half, Shlomo returned to the yeshiva of Amstov to study for another year. In the winter of 5661 (1900–1901), he studied with Avrohom Bornsztain for six months. In the summer of 1901 he returned home to Czeladź.

Several days after his eighteenth birthday in 1902, Sztencl married Miriam Bayla, daughter of Rabbi Efraim Mordechai Mottel Zweigenhaft. Following his marriage, Sztencl began writing a diary, in which he kept a cheshbon hanefesh (lit. "soul-reckoning"), which was discovered only after his death.

At the age of 21 Sztencl became rabbi of Czeladź. Four years later he moved to Sosnowiec and was appointed rabbi and dayan (religious judge). He also led a yeshiva.

Sztencl died on August 31, 1919 (5 Elul 5679) at the age of 35.

== Family ==
Sztencl is the father of Yonah Sztencl and of Ester (1913-1943), the wife of Shlomo Zev Zweigenhaft.

== Works ==
Sztencl's father collected and prepared his son's writings for publication. The manuscript was then divided into two books: Koheles Shlomo and Beis Shlomo. The former was published in 1932 and reprinted in 1973 by his Israeli descendants. In 2013 Beis Shlomo was published for the first time in one volume together with Koheles Shlomo in Jerusalem. The book was entitled Chidushei Hagaon M'sosnovitz (Novelle of the Genius of Sosnowiec).

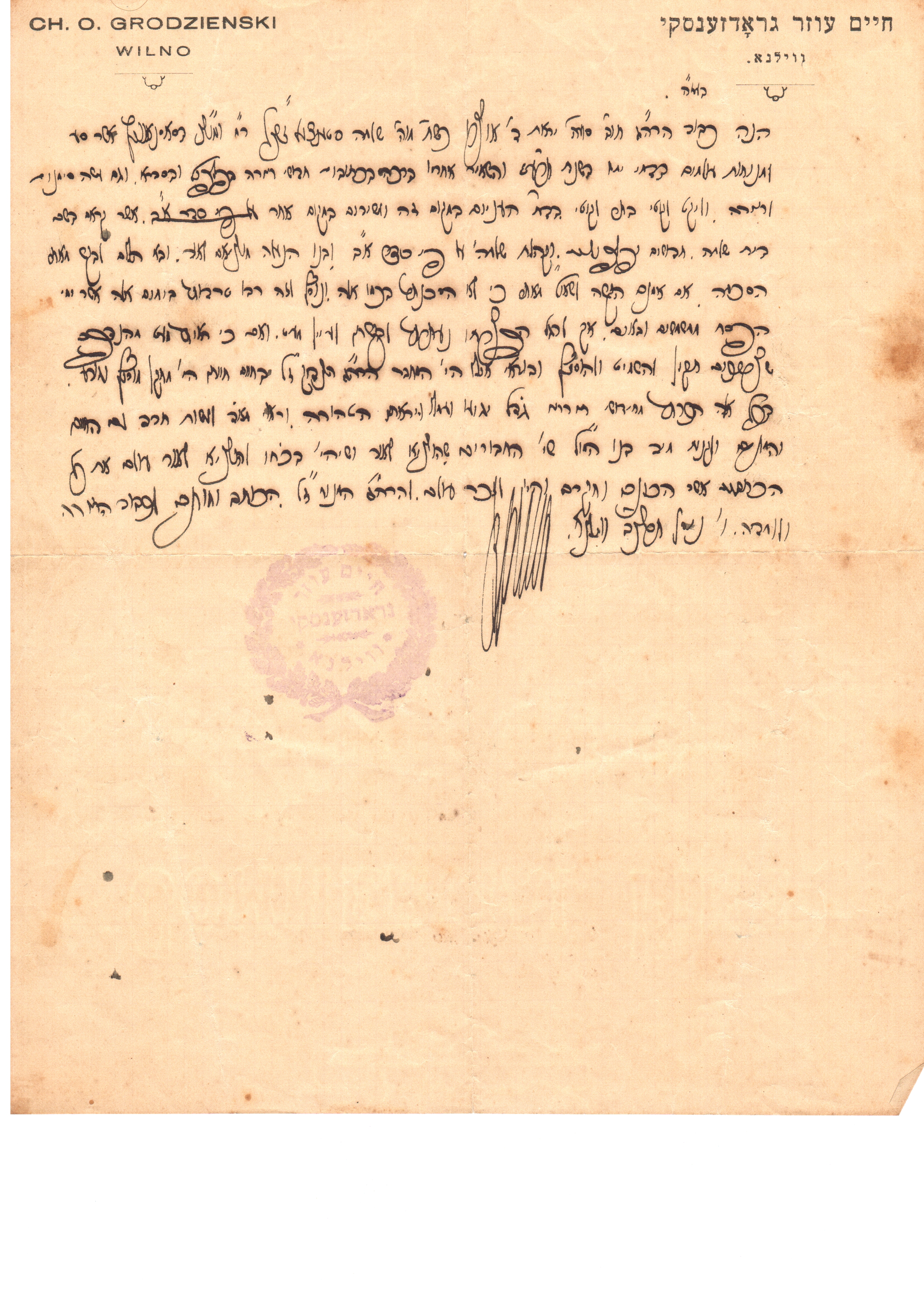
Rabbi Chaim Ozer Grodzinski's approval of Kohelet Shlomo

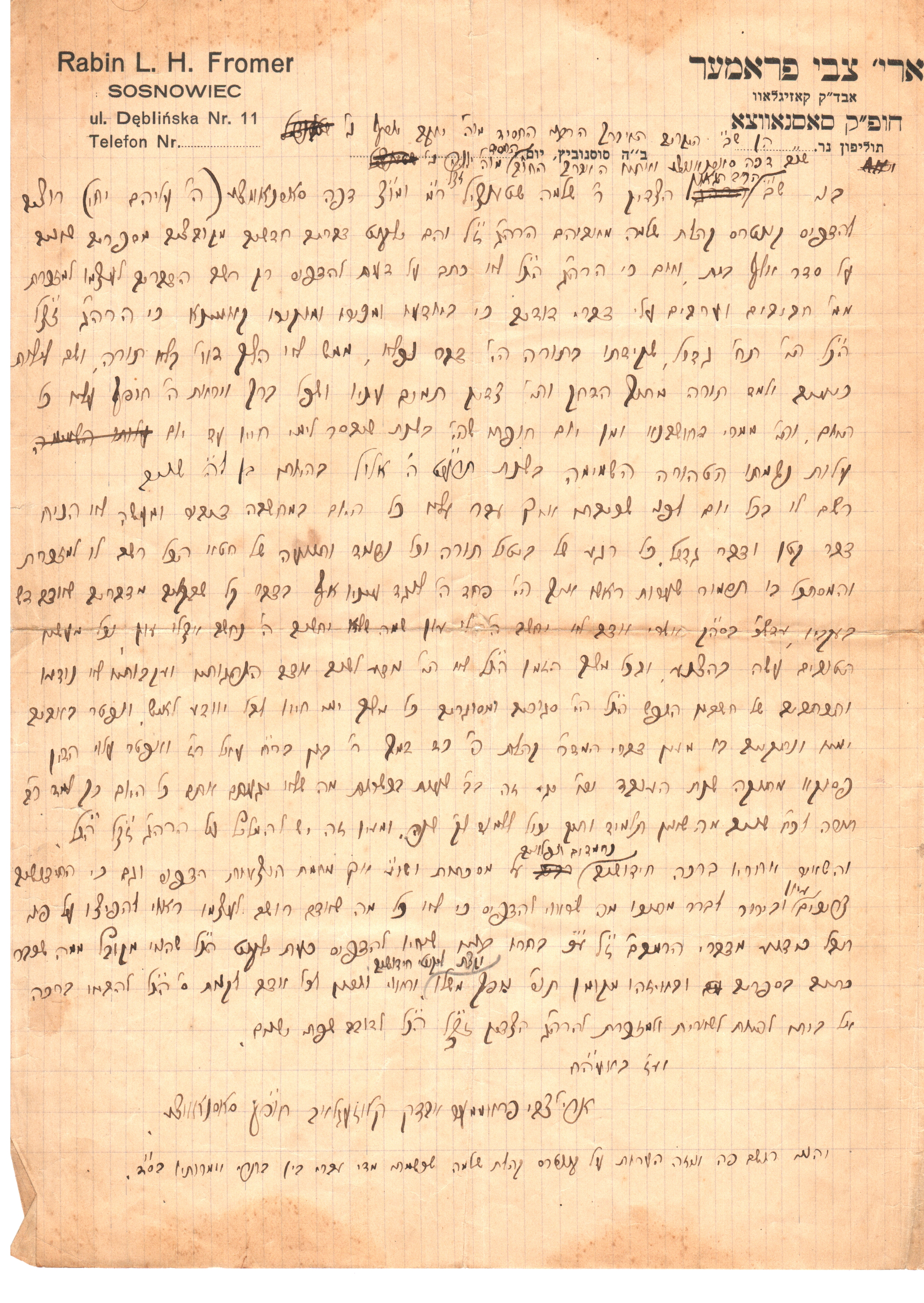
Rabbi Aryeh Tzvi Frumer's approval of one of Sztencl's books
