= Abraham Nahum Stencl =

Polish-born Yiddish poet

- Avrom Nokhem Sztencl
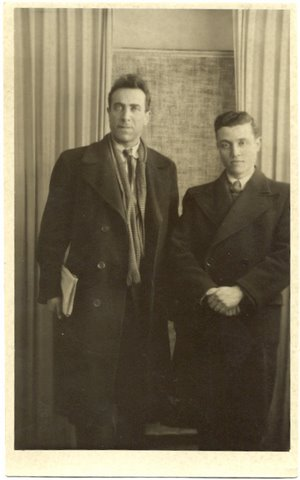
- Photographic image of Stencl (left) with a friend, 1922
- Born: May 9, 1897; Czeladź, Piotrków Governorate, Congress Poland
- Died: January 28, 1983 (aged 85); London, England, United Kingdom
- Relatives: Shlomo Sztencl
- Writing career
- Language: Yiddish

Abraham Nahum Stencl (Polish: Avrom Nokhem Sztencl; Hebrew: אברהם נחום שטנצל; 1897–1983) was a Polish-born Yiddish poet.

== Life ==
Stencl was born in Czeladź in south-western Poland, and studied at the yeshiva in Sosnowiec, where his brother, Shlomo Sztencl, was rabbi.

He left home in 1917; he joined a Zionist community, the HeHalutz Group. His views were not in fact Zionist, but the agricultural work appealed. Late in 1918 he received conscription papers for the Imperial Russian Army, and with his father's approval he immediately left Poland. In 1919 he travelled to the Netherlands and worked in the steel industry.

He began travelling to Germany, and emigrated to Berlin in 1921 where he met intellectuals and writers such as Franz Kafka and Kafka's lover Dora Diamant. A religious Jew by upbringing, he now led an extreme and spontaneous bohemian life, and became an habitué of the Romanisches Café.

Stencl began to write Yiddish poetry in a pioneering modernist and expressionist style, publishing poems from 1925 and several books into the 1930s. His poems were translated into German, and were well reviewed by Thomas Mann and Arnold Zweig. He ran a secretive Polish-Yiddish literary group, and kept in touch with Diamant, until she left in February 1936.

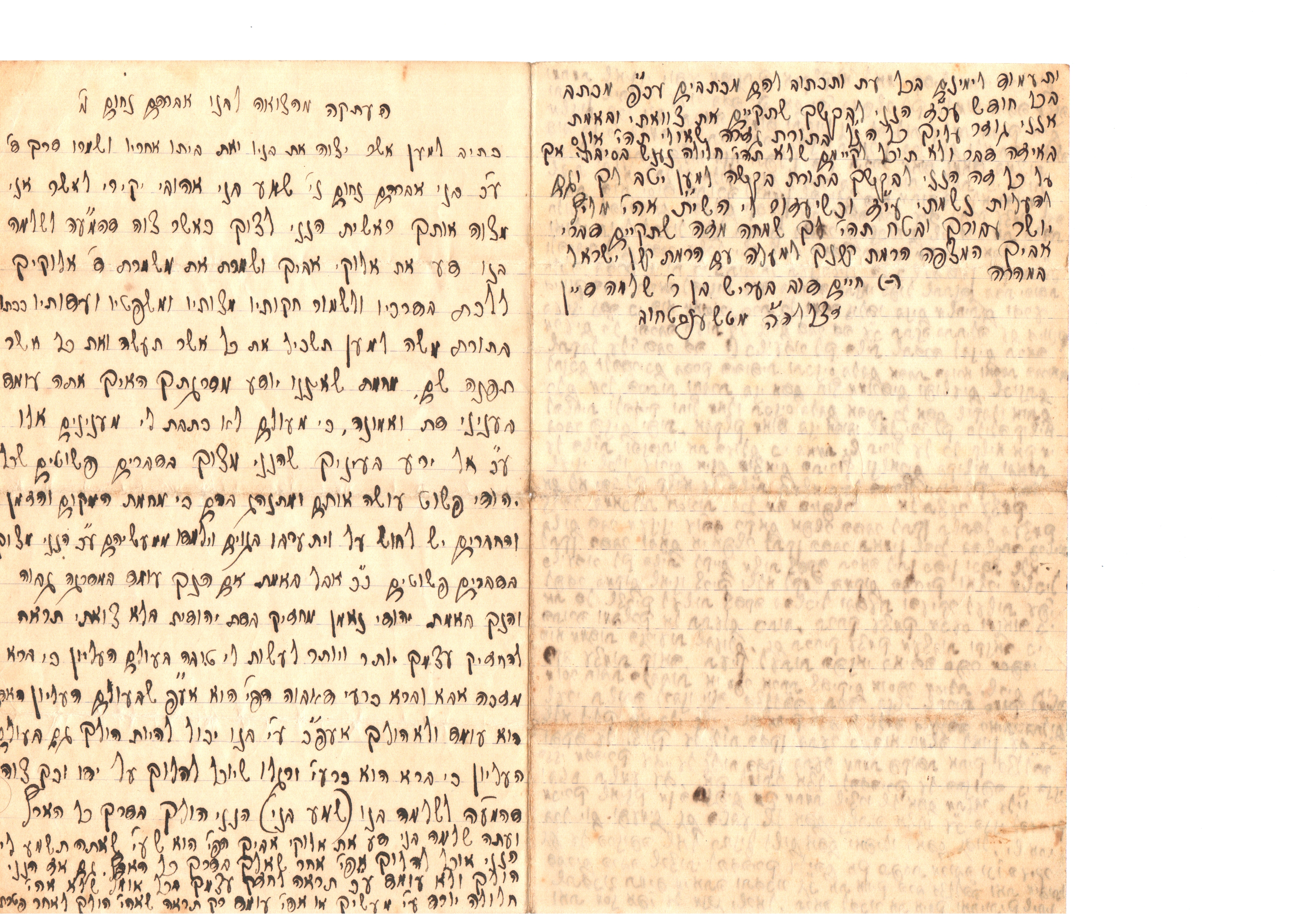
Will written by Rabbi Chaim Dov Stenzel to his son Avraham Nachum

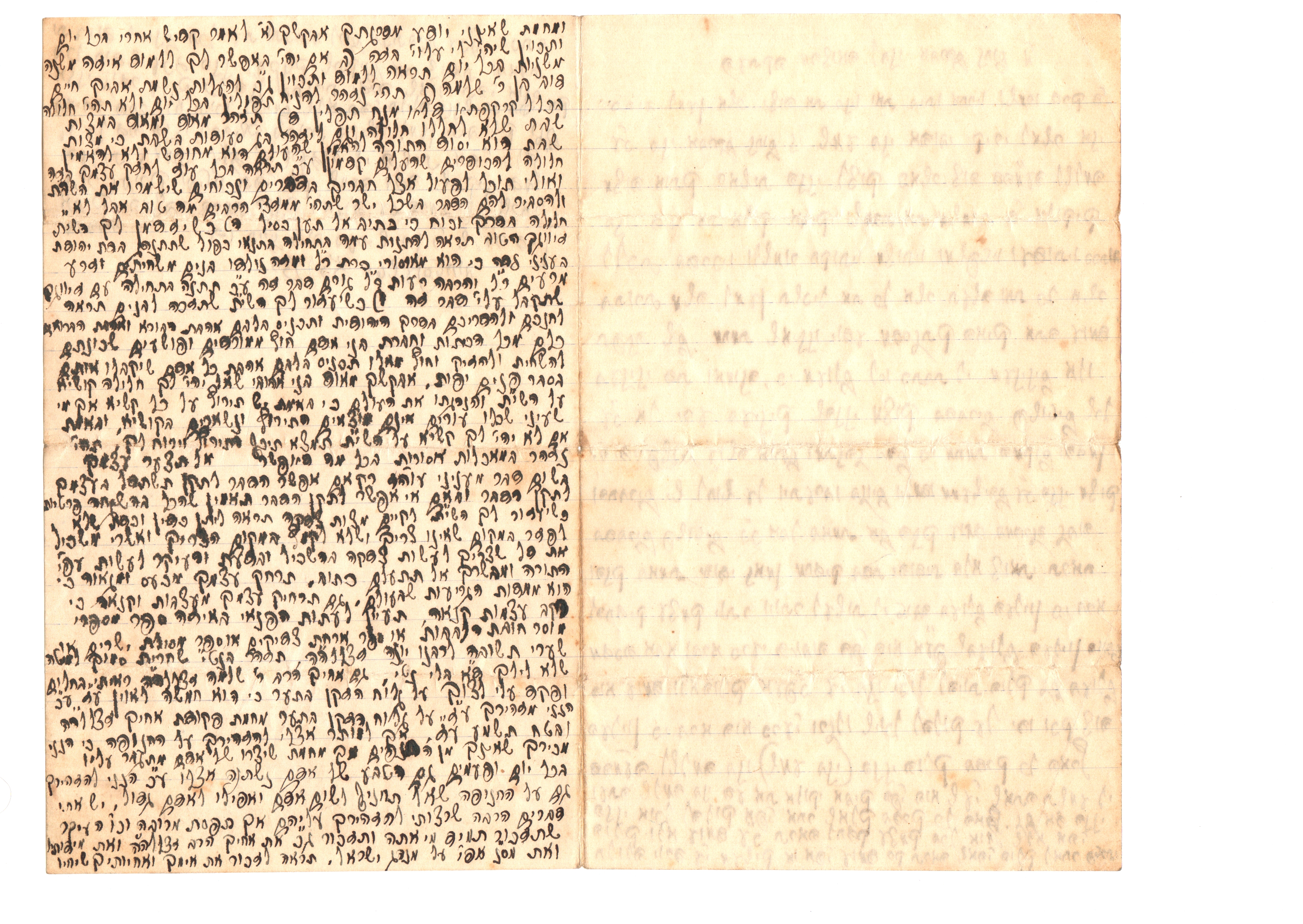
Will written by Rabbi Chaim Dov Stenzel to his son Avraham Nachum

Stencl was arrested in 1936 and tortured by the Gestapo. However, he was released and made his escape to the United Kingdom, settling in London (from 1944), initially in Hampstead, but soon moving to Whitechapel. There he met again with Diamant, and founded the Literarische Shabbes Nokhmitogs (later known as Friends of Yiddish), a weekly meeting involving political debate, literature, poetry and song, in the Yiddish language. He found an English translator in Joseph Leftwich. He also edited the Yiddish literary journal Loshn und Lebn, from 1946 to 1981. Diamant in 1951 defined Stencl's work as a mitzvah, to keep Yiddish alive.

When Stencl died in 1983, his great-niece donated his papers to the School of Oriental and African Studies.

== Works ==
- Un du bist Got (c. 1924, Leipzig) as A. N. Sztencl
- Stencl, A. N., Fischerdorf (Fishing Village), German tr. Etta Federn, Berlin-Wilmersdorf: Kartell Lyrische Autoren, 1931.
- Stencl, Abraham Nahum, Londoner soneṭn, Y. Naroditsḳi, 1937.
- Stencl, Abraham Nahum, Englishe maysṭer in der moleray : tsu der oysshṭelung itsṭ fun zeyere bilder in der arṭ-galerye in Ṿayṭshepl, Y. Naroditsḳi, 1942.
- Stencl, Abraham Nahum, All My Young Years : Yiddish Poetry from Weimar Germany, bilingual edition (Yiddish - English), tr. Haike Beruriah Wiegand & Stephen Watts, intro. Heather Valencia, Nottingham : Five Leaves, 2007.
- An English translation of one of Stencl's poems, Where Whitechapel Stood is published in Sinclair's London: City of Disappearances, referenced below.

== Sources ==
- Rachel Lichtenstein (2006), "Avram Nachum Stencl", in Sinclair, Iain (ed.), London: City of disappearances, London: Hamish Hamilton, ISBN 0-241-14299-7.
- S. S. Prawer (3 May 1985), "A.N. Stencl — Poet of Whitechapel", The Times Literary Supplement
- Leftwich, Joseph (1939). The Golden Peacock: An anthology of Yiddish poetry translated into English verse. R. Anscombe.
- Kathi Diamant (2003), Kafka's Last Love: The Mystery of Dora Diamant.
- The papers of Abrahman Nahum Stencl are held by SOAS Special Collections. Digitised items from the collection are available online.
