= Eduard von der Hellen =

Eduard von der Hellen (October 27, 1863 – December 17, 1927) was a German writer, philologist, archivist and editor.

Von der Hellen was affiliated with the Goethe and Schiller Archive in Weimar.

== Life ==
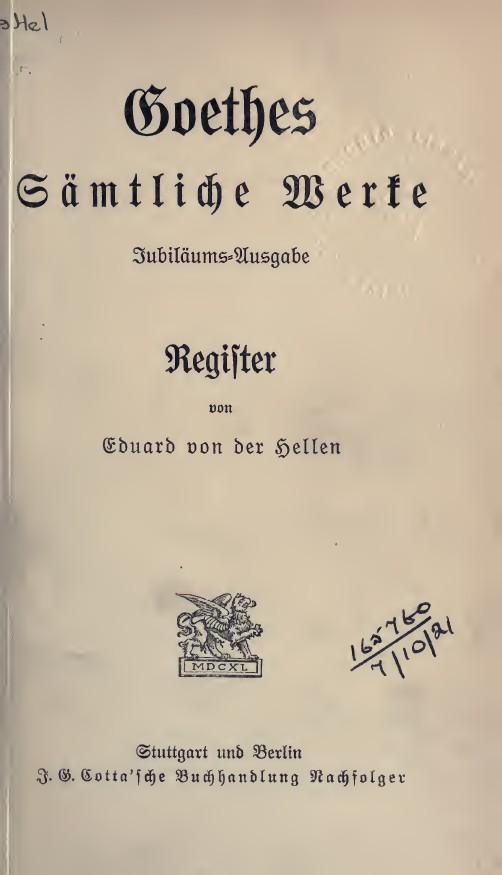
Register (1912)

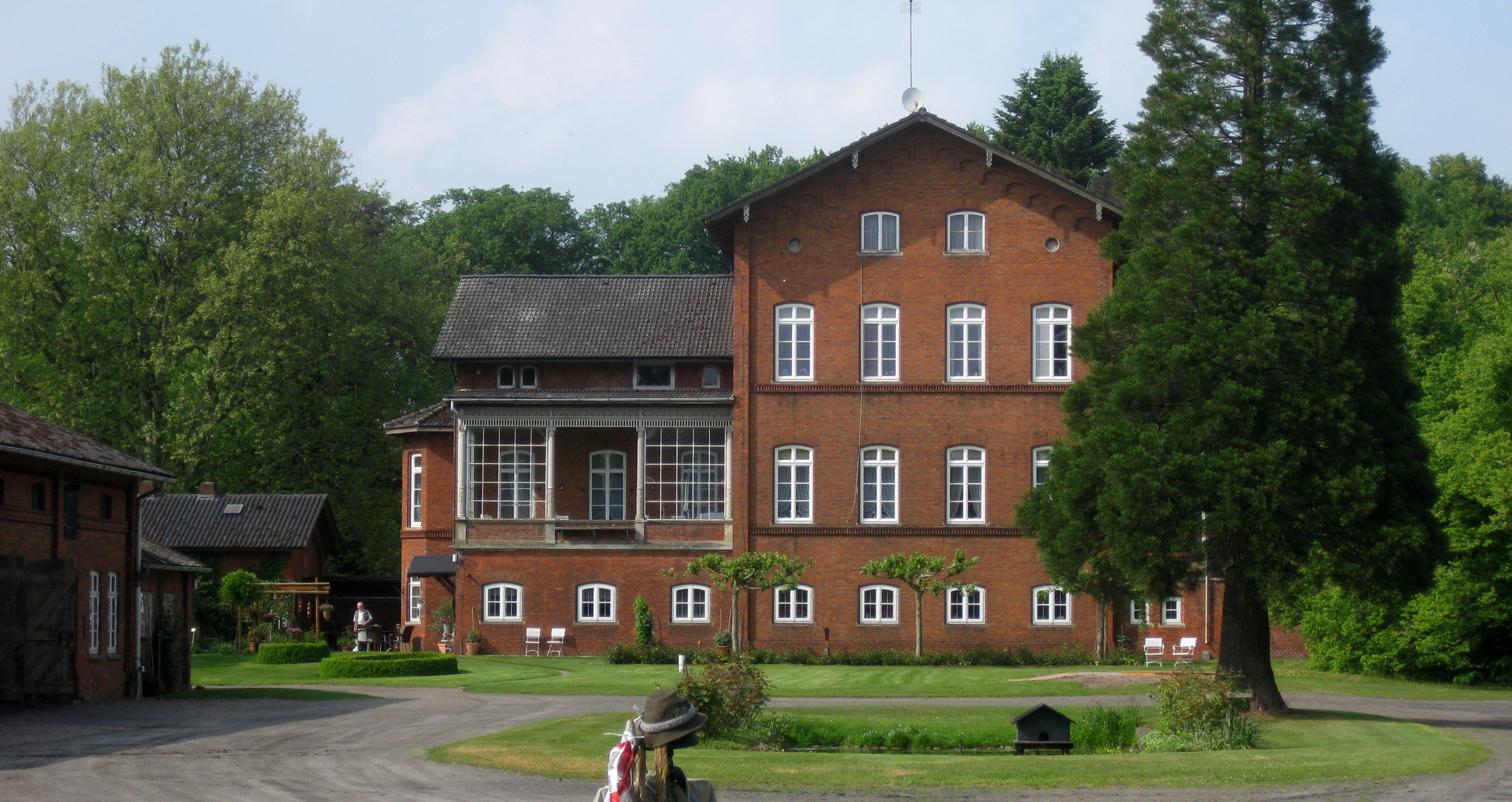
Birthplace: manor house in Nassen Straße, Wellen

Eduard von der Hellen was born on October 27, 1863, at Rittergut Wellen/Nordhannover, and died on December 17, 1927, in Stuttgart.

Elisabeth Förster-Nietzsche met von der Hellen and Rudolf Steiner at the Weimar Goethe and Schiller Archive in 1894. Von der Hellen was appointed to the Nietzsche Archive on October 1, 1894, and Hoffmann records that tensions between von der Hellen and Steiner arose in connection with the appointment. In 1895, Fritz Koegel edited Nietzsche's works with partial collaboration from von der Hellen, and von der Hellen left the Nietzsche Archive in February 1895.

At J. G. Cotta'sche Buchhandlung, von der Hellen worked in the scholarly editorial office and maintained the publishing house's archive. According to Franz Menges, von der Hellen ordered most of Cotta's correspondence and manuscripts, supplemented the library's Goethe and Schiller holdings, and had extensive author indexes produced for the Allgemeine Zeitung, Das Ausland and the Morgenblatt.

Von der Hellen edited the 40-volume jubilee edition of Goethe's works, which appeared between 1902 and 1912. He also edited the 16-volume secular edition of Schiller's works, published by J. G. Cotta'sche Buchhandlung in Stuttgart and Berlin in 1904–1905.

== Works ==
=== As author ===
- Goethes Anteil an Lavaters physiognomischen Fragmenten, Frankfurt am Main, Literarische Anstalt Rütten & Loening, 1888.
- Wilhelm I. und Bismarck in ihrem Briefwechsel, edited and annotated by Eduard von der Hellen.
- Heinrich von Plate. Der Roman eines Privilegierten, Stuttgart, J. G. Cotta, 1921.
- Register, Stuttgart and Berlin, J. G. Cotta'sche Buchhandlung Nachfolger, 1912.

=== As editor ===
- Das Journal von Tiefurt, with an introduction by Bernhard Suphan, Weimar, Goethe-Gesellschaft, 1892.
- Fürst Bismarcks Briefe an seine Braut und Gattin, selected and edited by Eduard von der Hellen, Stuttgart, J. G. Cotta, 1912.
