= Yehuda Aharon Vidovsky =

Polish-born Israeli businessman and Holocaust survivor (1919–2026)

- Hebrew: יהודה אהרן וידבסקי; Polish: Jehuda Widawski
- Vidovski in 2009
- Born: Yehuda Aharon Vidovsky; 25 July 1919; Turek, Łódź Voivodeship, Poland
- Died: 13 September 2026 (aged 107)
- Occupation: Businessman
- Known for: Holocaust survival
- Spouse: Dobrish Wasserzug
- Children: 2
- Parents: Avraham Leah (father); Dovrish Leah (mother)

Yehuda Aharon Vidovsky (Hebrew: יהודה אהרן וידבסקי; Polish: Jehuda Widawski; 25 July 1919 – 13 September 2026) was an Israeli businessman and Holocaust survivor of Polish origin. He was Israel's oldest living man at the time of his death.

== Biography ==
Yehuda Aharon Vidovsky was born to Avraham and Dovrish Leah in the town of Turek, in the Sieradz Land. When he was about 14 years old, his family moved to the city of Łódź. During the Holocaust, following the establishment of the Litzmannstadt Ghetto in early 1940, the entire family moved into an apartment purchased from a local resident; there, they continued to operate their sewing workshop, producing dress collars that were shipped to Nazi Germany. The workshop employed several dozen Jews in forced labour for the Nazis.

During the liquidation of the Ghetto on 29 August 1944, all members of Vidovsky's family were sent to Auschwitz. There, on 1 September 1944 (13 Elul 5704), his parents – Avraham and Dovrish Leah – and his elder brother Gabriel (a student at the Yeshivat Chachmei Lublin and a Hasid of the Sochatchover Rebbe) were murdered and cremated. His sister Yocheved was drowned at Stutthof, and his brother Chaim Moshe was murdered at Buchenwald. Only Yehuda and his brother Yehoshua survived Josef Mengele's selection and were sent to the Auschwitz labour camp. After some time, both were transferred to a labour camp in Friedland in Niederschlesien – a sub-camp of Groß-Rosen near Breslau – where they worked assembling aircraft wings until their liberation by the Soviet Army on 9 May 1945.

After the war, Vidovsky returned to Łódź, where he married Dobrish (née Wasserzug), re-established a textile factory, and attempted to rebuild the family business. During this period, he assisted the Irgun (Etzel) with arms shipments from Poland. His eldest son, Avraham, was born there. In 1950, he immigrated to Israel and settled in Tel Aviv, where his daughter Leah was born. Later in life Leah married Dr. Mordechai Himmelfarb.

=== Activities ===
In the late 1970s, while Poland was still part of the Warsaw Pact, Vidovsky returned there for the first time to search for his ancestors' graves. He subsequently began visiting regularly, striving to preserve and restore the memory of Jewish life in Poland in general, and in Łódź in particular. As part of this effort, he restored the Łódź cemetery and – together with his friend Yosef Buchman – renovated over 7,000 gravestones there. He also worked extensively at the Sochaczew cemetery, where the Sochaczew Rebbes – authors of the Avnei Nezer and Shem MiShmuel – are buried; he found the exact site of the ohel (mausoleum) that had stood over their graves, rebuilt it, and arranged for the renovation of the ohel of Rabbi Yisrael Taub, the first Modzitzer Rebbe and author of Divrei Yisrael.

On Holocaust Remembrance Day in 2012 (5772), Vidovsky was among those honoured to light a torch at the state ceremony at Yad Vashem. He regularly participated in the Holocaust commemoration ceremony organized by the Association of Łódź Jews in Israel; over the years, both Vidovsky and, later, his son Avraham were honoured with reciting the Kaddish and the El Malei Rachamim prayer at the event.

=== Personal life and death ===
As a follower of the Sochatchov Hasidic movement, Vidovsky regularly prayed at the Sochatchov synagogue on Rashi Street in Tel Aviv, and occasionally at the Modzitz synagogue near his home on Dizengoff Street, also in Tel Aviv.

In 2018, he travelled to Poland with 31 family members for a special journey tracing the milestones of his life, in anticipation of his 100th birthday.

On 30 July 2019 (27 Tammuz 5779), a 100th birthday celebration was held for Vidovsky, attended by former Chief Rabbi of Israel Rabbi Yisrael Meir Lau, the Admorim (Hasidic leaders) of Modzitz and Sochatchov, and other rabbis.

Vidovsky had two children and lived to see a fifth-generation descendant. His granddaughter, Sarah Rivka Himmelfarb, authored a study on the book Aglei Tal by Rabbi Avraham Bornstein (known as the Avnei Nezer).

Vidovsky died on 13 September 2026, at the age of 107. LongeviQuest, a professional gerontology organization that validates supercentenarians and near-supercentenarians, said that Vidovsky (Widawski) was Israel's oldest living man at the time of his death.

== See also ==
- Israel Kristal, the oldest male Holocaust survivor in history, also a Jewish survivor of the Łódź Ghetto just like Yehuda Vidovsky.
