= Shem Mishmuel =

Shem Mishmuel (Hebrew: שם משמואל) is a nine-volume collection of homiletical teachings on the Torah and Jewish holidays delivered by Rabbi Shmuel Bornsztain, the second Sochatchover Rebbe, between the years 1910–1926. A major work in Hasidic thought, it synthesizes the Hasidism of Pshischa and Kotzk in the style of Sochatchov, and is frequently cited in Torah shiurim (lectures) and articles.

Bornsztain became known as the Shem Mishmuel after the title of this work, which was published posthumously.

== Title ==
The title comes from the Mishnah on Shabbat 12:3, which describes the prohibition against writing on Shabbat. The Mishnah teaches that if a Jew wishes to write a whole name like Shimon (שמעון) or Shmuel (שמואל), but writes only the first two letters of these names, shin (ש) and mem (מ), he still transgresses the prohibition—for shin and mem spell a shorter name, shem (שם) (which means "name"). Bornsztain's choice of the Mishnaic expression shem miShimon o miShmuel (Shem from Shimon or Shmuel) for his title reflects the classical rabbinic play on words combining a rabbinic teaching with the author's name.

== Content and structure ==
The first eight volumes of Shem Mishmuel cover lessons on each of the parshiyot (weekly Torah readings). In traditional Hasidic style, they are not printed according to the sequence of the parshiyot but in the order in which the Rebbe delivered these lessons to his followers. The ninth volume deals exclusively with the Passover Haggadah.

In addition to displaying a thorough familiarity with the Talmud, Midrash, Kabbalah, and other classic Jewish sources, Bornsztain presents many of the ideas of his father, Rabbi Avrohom Bornsztain, the first Sochatchover Rebbe, who was known as the Avnei Nezer after the title of his major work.

== Printing history ==
The volume on the Pesach Haggadah was published first by Bornsztain's son and successor, Rabbi Dovid Bornsztain, the third Sochatchover Rebbe, in Piotrków in 1927. Rabbi Dovid published the rest of the volumes between 1927 and 1932, with funding provided by Rabbi David Parshinowski. Bornsztain's other son, Rabbi Chanoch Henoch Bornsztain, who had immigrated to Israel in 1924 and became the fourth Sochatchover Rebbe after Rabbi David died in the Warsaw Ghetto in 1942, published the second edition of Shem Mishmuel in Jerusalem in 1950 with the aid of Rabbi Avraham Parshan, son of Rabbi Parshinowski.

Rabbi Parshan also assisted with the publication of a third edition in 1965. The third edition of the volume dealing with the Hagaddah included an additional section containing chiddushei Torah (new Torah thoughts) on the Hagaddah, which had been penned by Rabbi Dovid and which had survived the war, entitled Chasdei Dovid. Other editions followed; the seventh, corrected edition used by Rabbi Zvi Belovski in his English translation for Targum Press was published in Israel in 1988 by the Parshan family trust in memory of Rabbi Parshan.
