= Shmuel Bornsztain =

Shmuel Bornsztain (also Borenstein or Bernstein) may refer to:

- Shmuel Bornsztain, second Sochatchover Rebbe (1856–1926), author of Shem Mishmuel
- Shmuel Bornsztain, sixth Sochatchover Rebbe (born 1961)
