= Meir Dan Plotzky =

Polish rabbi (1866–1928)

Rabi Meir Dan Plotzky
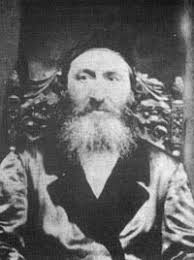

Personal life
- Born: 1866
- Died: 27 March 1928 (aged 61–62)
- Parent: Rabbi Chaim Yitzchak Ber Plotzker (father)
- Education: Rabbi Avrohom Bornsztain

Religious life
- Religion: Judaism

Jewish leader
- Yeshiva: Mesivta of Warsaw
- Organisation: Agudas HaRabbonim

Meir Dan Plotsky (or Plotski) (1866 - 27 March 1928) was a member of the Moetzes Gedolei HaTorah and the president of Kollel Polen, a talmudic scholar who authored the Kli Chemdah, a commentary on the Torah. He also authored the Chemdas Yisrael on Sefer ha-Mitzvot.

== Life ==
Plotsky was the son of Rabbi Chaim Yitzchak Ber Plotzker of Kutno, who was first a follower of Rabbi Chanoch Henich of Alexander, but who then became a follower of the Sfas Emes of Ger. At the age of nine, Plotsky was sent to learn in the yeshiva of Rabbi Chaim Eliezer Wax, the Nefesh Chayah, in Kalisz, president of Kupat Rabbi Meir Baal HaNes Kollel Polen. Shortly before his bar mitzvah, he became a disciple of Rabbi Avrohom Bornsztain (the Avnei Nezer), first Sochatchover Rebbe, whom he considered his lifelong rebbe muvhak (primary Torah teacher).

Plotsky married at the age of 15 and spent the next 10 years in Dvohrt with his in-laws. In 1891, he became Rav in Dvohrt. Later he helped expose the forged Yerushalmi on Kodshim, claimed to be discovered by Shlomo Yehuda Friedlander, who also claimed he was a Sefardi named Shlomo Yehuda Algazi. At the age of 36 he published his work on the Sefer Hamitzvos of Maimonides, called Chemdas Yisrael. In 1918, he became Rav of Ostrow-Mazowiecka in eastern Poland. He was voted chairman of Agudas Harabbanim of Poland, a prelude to Agudath Israel. In 1921, Rabbi Plotsky participated in a tour of American cities on behalf of the Agudath Israel, visiting New York, Baltimore, Boston and Cincinnati. At the age of 60, he left the rabbinate to head a large yeshiva in Warsaw, known simply as the Mesivta.

== Family ==
From 1930, his son-in-law, Rabbi Yaacov Shraga Zinger, took his place as rav of Ostrow-Mazowiecka. His son, Rabbi Israel, was a teacher and halacha posek in the city. They were both slaughtered in the Holocaust.
