= Shmuel Bornsztain (second Sochatchover rebbe) =

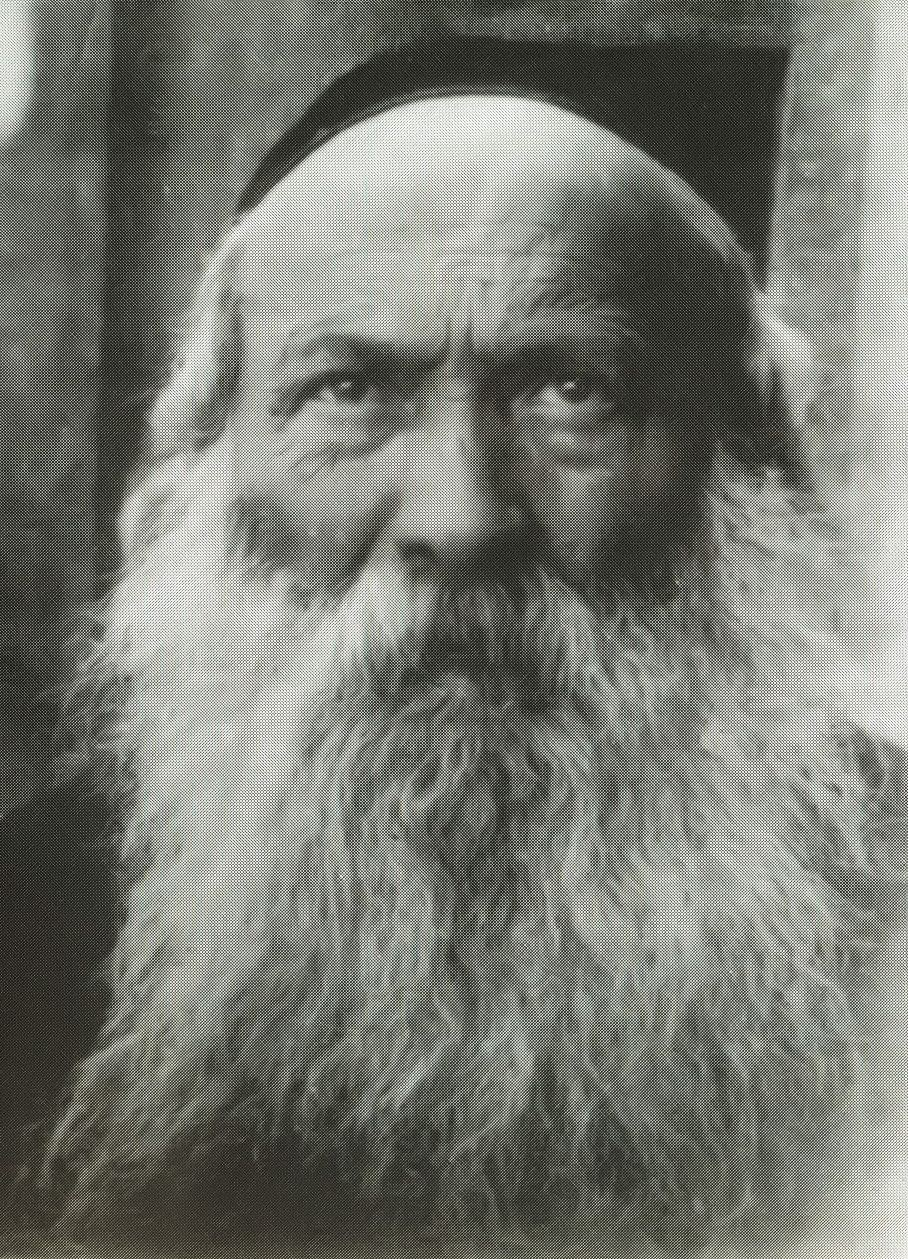
- Title: Second Sochatchover Rebbe

Personal life
- Born: Shmuel Bornsztain; October 16, 1855 Kotzk
- Died: January 10, 1926 (aged 70) Otwock
- Buried: Sochatchov
- Spouse: Yuta Leah Litmanowicz, Mirel Shapiro
- Children: Dovid; Chanoch Henoch
- Parents: Avrohom Bornsztain (father); Sara Tzina Morgenstern (mother)
- Dynasty: Sochatchov

Religious life
- Religion: Judaism

Jewish leader
- Predecessor: Avrohom Bornsztain (Bornsztajn)
- Successor: Dovid Bornsztain (Bornsztajn)
- Began: 1910
- Ended: 1926
- Main work: Shem Mishmuel
- Dynasty: Sochatchov

Shmuel Bornsztain (16 October 1855 – 10 January 1926), Hebrew calendar (4 Cheshvan 5616 – 24 Teves 5686), also spelled Borenstein or Bernstein, was the second Rebbe of the Sochatchov Hasidic dynasty. He was known as the Shem Mishmuel by the title of his nine-volume work of Torah and Hasidic thought. He was a leading Hasidic thinker in early 20th-century Europe and a Rebbe to thousands of Hasidim in the Polish cities of Sochaczew (Sochatchov) and Łódź.

== Early life ==
Shmuel Bornsztain was the only son of Rabbi Avrohom Bornsztain, author of Avnei Nezer and the first Sochatchover Rebbe. He had one younger sister, Esther. Through his father's line, he was a descendant of the Rema and the Shach. His grandfather was Rabbi Ze'ev (Wolf) Nachum Bornsztain, Rav of Biala and a Hasid of the Kotzker Rebbe. His mother, Sara Tzina Morgenstern, was the daughter of the Kotzker Rebbe, Rabbi Menachem Mendel Morgenstern.

Bornsztain was born in the home of his maternal grandfather, the Kotzker Rebbe, in Kotzk during the time that his father was being supported by his father-in-law, as was the custom in those days. He spent his childhood in the towns of Parczew and Krośniewice, where his father held positions as Rav. Rabbi Avrohom Bornsztain was his son's primary Torah teacher throughout his childhood, and a close and long-lasting bond developed between the two. Even later in life, as the father of a large family, Shmuel regarded himself as his father's talmid (student) and learned with him every day. In his writings, Shmuel synthesized the values and insights of Kotzker Hasidut—as taught by his grandfather, the Kotzker Rebbe—and Peshischa Hasidut, synthesizing them into the unique style that became Sochatchover Hasidut.

In 1873/1874, Bornsztain married Yuta Leah Litmanowicz, daughter of Rabbi Eliezer Lipman Litmanowicz, who was the son-in-law of the first Radomsker Rebbe, Rabbi Shlomo Rabinowicz (the Tiferes Shlomo), and a dedicated Kotzker Hasid. Unlike the prevailing custom of moving in with or near his father-in-law, the newlywed Bornsztain chose to live near his father, Rabbi Avrohom, in Krośniewice, and followed him to the towns of Nasielsk and Sochaczew (Sochatchov) when the latter assumed the leadership of those communities. In Sochatchov, Bornsztain and his family lived in a separate house in the center of the city and earned a living from a wine store run by an associate.

In 1891, Rabbi Avrohom sent his son to Palestine to purchase land for a Hasidic colony. However, the Ottoman imperial ban on selling land to foreigners prevented him from accomplishing this goal.

Bornsztain's wife died on 24 November 1901 (13 Kislev 5662). He remarried to Miriam (Mirel) Shapiro, daughter of Rabbi Moshe Nathan Kahana-Shapiro, Rav of Keshionzh, in 1903 and Golda Kahana-Shapiro née Szydłowski who was a descendant of Judah Leib ben Isaac.

== As Rebbe ==
Shmuel Bornsztain was crowned second Sochatchover Rebbe following the death of his father in 1910. He was accepted by all the elder Hasidim of his father's court, including Rabbi Yoav Yehoshua of Kinczek and Rabbi Yitzchak Feigenbaum, the av beit din of Warsaw.

On his father's first yahrzeit, Bornsztain established Yeshivat Beit Avrohom in Sochaczew and appointed Rabbi Aryeh Tzvi Frumer, av beit din of Koziegłowy, as rosh yeshiva. This yeshiva taught hundreds of boys and operated until the outbreak of World War I.

Bornsztain also labored over the compilation and publication of his father's manuscripts. He published his father's voluminous responsa on every section of Shulchan Aruch in seven volumes, under the title Avnei Nezer ("Stones of the Crown"). In his own lessons and writings, Bornsztain was seen as less of an innovator than an interpreter of his father's teachings.

== World War I ==
At the outbreak of World War I, Bornsztain was visiting a spa in Germany and was arrested as a Russian citizen. Only after much effort did he succeed in returning to Poland with other Rebbes who had been similarly detained. Due to persecution of Jews by the Tsarist government, he could not return to Sochaczew, but resettled in Łódź with his family. Here he acted as a guide and advisor to his own Hasidim as well as Hasidim of other dynasties and non-Hasidim seeking encouragement and support.

In 1915, the town of Sochaczew was overrun and destroyed by the German army.

In 1919, Bornsztain chose to leave the tumult of the big city, which was taking its toll on his health as well as his ability to concentrate on his holy work, and relocated to Zgierz, a small town near Łódź . Here he established his yeshiva and led his Hasidic court.

His health worsened in 1926 and, upon the advice of his doctors, he moved to Otwock, a resort near Warsaw. There he died at the age of 70 on 8 January. He was brought to burial in the same ohel (covered grave) as his father, the Avnei Nezer, in Sochaczew. His 19 children included: 10 sons, David, Ya’akov, Mosheh Eliezer, Hanokh Heynekh, Aharon Yisrael, Avraham, Naphtali Tzvi Hirsch, Simhah Bunim, Hayyim Yitzhak, and Shmuel (born after his father’s decease and his namesake), and nine daughters, Frumeta, Faiga, Margalit, Dobrysz, Hayyah, Sarah Tzinah, Esther Leah, Golda Brakhah, and Hadassah; his son David succeeded him as the third Sochatchover Rebbe, his son Hanokh Heynekh eventually succeeded him as the fourth Sochatchover Rebbe, and most of his other children were murdered by the Nazis during the Holocaust.

== Quotes ==
- "The soul is always holy; this is the way it came from God. The challenge is making the body holy".

== Rebbes of Sochatchov ==
1. Avrohom Bornsztain, the Avnei Nezer (1838–1910)
2. Shmuel Bornsztain, the Shem Mishmuel (1855–1926)
3. Dovid Bornsztain (1876–1942)
4. Chanoch Henoch Bornsztain (d. 1965)
5. Menachem Shlomo Bornsztain (d. 1969)
6. Shmuel Bornsztain (b. 1961)
