= Chaim Elozor Wax =

Chaim Elozor Wax (1822, Tarnogród – 1889, Kalisz) was a well-known Hasidic rabbi, posek, and a Jewish leader in Poland. He was a philanthropist and accomplished student of the Talmud.

He is especially known from his responsa work Nefesh Haya, and as the president of Kupat Rabbi Meir Baal HaNes Kollel Polen, Warsaw region.

== Tarnogrod ==
Wax was born in 1822 in the city of Tarnogród, near the border of Austrian-ruled Polish Galicia. His father, Rabbi Avraham Yehuda Leibish, was also known for his scholarship. According to the introduction of his book "Nefesh Haya", his mother was a devout and supportive woman who, when Wax fell seriously ill as a child, prayed to God to take her life instead of her son's, or failing that (since it would leave the child motherless) to transfer the illness to her and let him recover. The young Wax quickly recovered, apparently answering his mother's prayer: she died, fulling her pledge, after Wax had become established in the community.

At age 18, Wax became the rabbi of Tarnogrod, a post he held for around 20 years.

== Kalisz ==
In 1859 the rabbi of Kalisz, Meir Auerbach, left for Israel and Wax was appointed his successor. His arrival inaugurated a new period of religious observance in the town, during which even shoemakers dedicated hours during the day to torah studies. A new synagogue was also built in Kalisz during his rabbinate.

Wax's first wife, Blime, daughter of Rabbi Moshe Yosef (a brother of Rabbi Chaim Halbershtam of Sanz), died in 1866 while he was rabbi of Kalisz. In 1868 he married Shifra Mirl Trunk, the daughter of the scholar and posek Rabbi Yisroel Yehoshua Trunk of Kutno.

At the Kalisz yeshiva he cultivated promising young Torah scholars to form the next generation of Jewish leaders. On one occasion a delegation from Oshikov visited, asking him to help them appoint a qualified scholar as their rabbi. Wax sent a proxy to summon the student Eliyah Singer, and in front of the delegation Wax instructed Singer to sit on his rabbinical chair and handed him a rabbinical hat. Wax then faced the delegation, calling out "Mazel Tov! Here is your rabbi!"

Rabbi Meir Dan Plotzky was Wax's student

== Pietrokov ==
Wax lost his position as rabbi of Kalisz in a dispute over a wedding, when the influential father of the bride insisted on including elements forbidden in Jewish custom and law. The father refused the rabbi's request to conform to custom, and had his friend the governor command Wax to perform the ceremony. When the rabbi refused the governor dismissed him from his post. Though the wedding eventually proceeded according to the rabbi's demands, Wax's tenure as rabbi of Kalisz was at an end. Instead he became rabbi of Pietrokov.

== Zion and Zionism ==
Rabbi Wax was a committed follower of Rabbi Eliyahu Gutmacher of Grodzisk, and supported the idea of colonization and settlement of the holy land, but advocated most for the rights of the Yishuv haYashan, the original settlers who went to Israel to learn the Torah and devote themselves to God. His statements about Zionism are complex: at one time he quoted Rabbi Eliyahu's view that restoring Israel would hasten the arrival of Moshiach (a messianic future Jewish King of the Davidic line). On the other hand, in a letter to Hovevei Zion activist Yehiel Pins, Wax accused Theodor Herzl and his fellow agitators for Jewish statehood of being the destroyers, rather than champions, of Zion. He accused them of willingness to destroy the lives of those living already in Israel by diverting resources to nationalist campaigns and by aggravating the ruling Turkish government.

Wax advocated an initial strategy of supporting and strengthening Jewish communities in the holy land, with later provisions for new settlers. As president of the Warsaw-Kolel he worked to raise funds for the semi-annual Haluka and developed ideas for a long-term sustainable Israeli economy. With financial support from Sir Moshe Montefiori he advocated for the establishment of etrog agriculture in Israel, at a time when the etrog was an important symbol in Jewish culture. He traveled to Israel in 1886, with his father-in-law Rabbi Trunk, to supervise etrog plantations and establish housing and jobs for members of the Warsaw-Kolel who had come to Israel.
