= Menachem Shlomo Bornsztain =

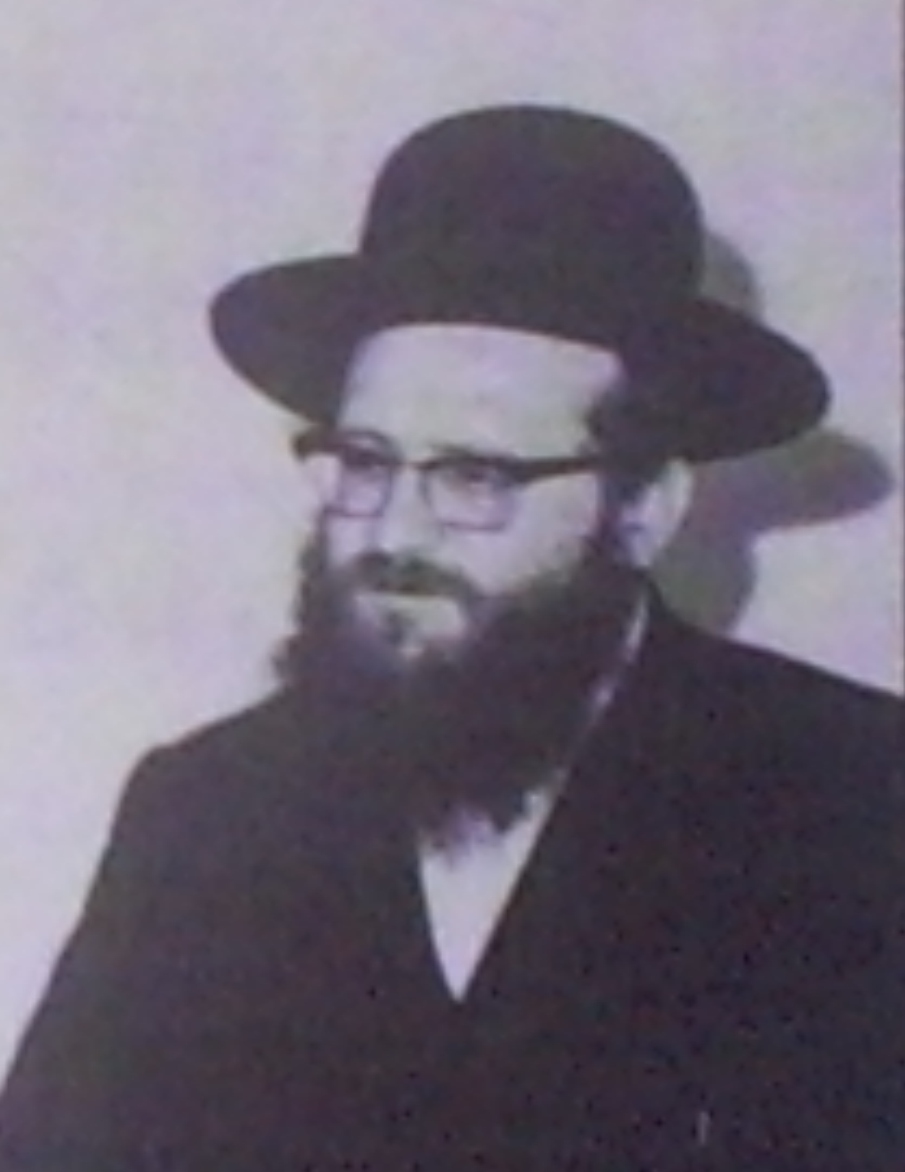
- Title: Sochatchover-Radomsker Rebbe

Personal life
- Born: Menachem Shlomo Bornsztain (Bornstein); October 11, 1934 Jerusalem, British Mandate of Palestine
- Died: August 10, 1969 (aged 34) Jerusalem, Israel
- Buried: Har HaMenuchot, Jerusalem
- Children: Shmuel Bornsztain; Avraham Nosson Bornsztain
- Parents: Chanoch Henoch Bornsztain (father); Freidel (mother)
- Dynasty: Sochatchov

Religious life
- Religion: Judaism

Jewish leader
- Predecessor: Chanoch Henoch Bornsztain
- Successor: Shmuel Bornsztain
- Began: 1965
- Ended: 1969
- Dynasty: Sochatchov

Menachem Shlomo Bornsztain (Hebrew: מנחם שלמה בורנשטיין; 11 October 1934–10 August 1969), also spelled Borenstein, Bornstein, or Bernstein, was the fifth rebbe of the Sochatchov Hasidic dynasty. He succeeded his father, Chanoch Henoch Bornsztain. He was known as the Sochatchover-Radomsker Rebbe, having also accepted the leadership of the Radomsk Hasidic dynasty upon the request of its surviving Hasidim, whose leaders had been murdered in the Holocaust. He served as rebbe for only four years; he was killed in a traffic accident at the age of 34.

== Early life ==
Bornsztain's father was the son of Shmuel Bornsztain. His mother, Freidel, was a granddaughter of Yechezkel Rabinowicz of Radomsk. At his circumcision ceremony, which normally takes place at eight days old but was delayed until his sixth week of life due to illness, he was named Menachem Shlomo after his paternal great-grandfather, Rabbi Menachem Mendel of Kotzk, and his maternal ancestor, Rabbi Shlomo Rabinowicz.

He attended a private Talmud Torah in Jerusalem he Studied at the Kfar HaRoeh Yeshiva and then became a student at the Knesses Chizkiyahu yeshiva in Zikhron Ya'akov in 1950.

Bornsztain married the daughter of a Tel Aviv rabbi.

== Career ==
He became rabbi of the Sochatchover shtiebel on Rashi Street in Tel Aviv in 1960 and the rabbi of Tel Aviv's Yad Eliyahu neighborhood in 1965.

Starting in 1965 Bornsztain led Kollel Keser Torah Radomsk in Bnei Brak, named after the network of 36 yeshivas in pre-war Poland established by the fourth Radomsker rebbe and headed by Bornsztain's uncle, David Moshe Rabinowicz, who had been murdered by the Nazis in the Warsaw Ghetto.

Bornsztain succeeded his father, who died in 1965, as Sochatchover rebbe. Bornsztain also became the rebbe of the Radomsker Hasidim who had survived the Holocaust, and became known as the Sochatchover-Radomsker Rebbe.

== Death and succession ==
On 10 August 1969 (26 Av 5729) Bornsztain was thrown from a taxi when an army vehicle crashed into it head-on. He died of his injuries the next day.

A few years after his death, his eldest son, Shmuel, became the sixth Sochatchover rebbe.

== Rebbes of Sochatchov ==
1. Avrohom Bornsztain, the Avnei Nezer (1838–1910)
2. Shmuel Bornsztain, the Shem Mishmuel (1856–1926)
3. Dovid Bornsztain (1876–1942)
4. Chanoch Henoch Bornsztain (d. 1965)
5. Menachem Shlomo Bornsztain (1934–1969)
6. Shmuel Bornsztain (b. 1961)

== Rebbes of Radomsk ==
1. Shlomo Hakohen Rabinowicz, the Tiferes Shlomo (1801–1866)
2. Avraham Yissachar Dov Hakohen Rabinowicz, the Chesed L'Avraham (1843–1892)
3. Yechezkel Hakohen Rabinowicz, the Kenesses Yechezkel (1862–1910)
4. Shlomo Chanoch Hakohen Rabinowicz, the Shivchei Kohen (1882–1942)
5. Menachem Shlomo Bornsztain, Sochatchover-Radomsker Rebbe (1934–1969)
