= Yitzchak Zelig Morgenstern =

Polish rabbi (1866–1939)

Yitzchak Zelig Morgenstern of Kotzk-Sokolov (Hebrew: יצחק זליג מורגנשטרן, מסוקולוב, Yiddish: זעליג מארגענשטערן, מסאקאלאוו, of Sokolov; 1866 – 16 October 1939 (3 Cheshvan 5700)) was an Admor and Rosh yeshiva, a member of the Moetzes Gedolei HaTorah and a leader of Polish Jewry before the Holocaust, who died shortly after the war began.

== Life ==
=== Early years ===
He was born in Kotzk in 1866 to Yocheved and Chaim Yisrael Morgenstern, who was the grandson of Menachem Mendel of Kotzk and son of David Morgenstern, the second Rebbe of Kotzk.

He was educated in the Beit Midrash in Kock, the second largest dynasty that continued the tradition of Menachem Mendel of Kotzk. At the age of 16 he married Chaya Hinda and over the years they had 11 children. Even after his wedding, he continued to live near his father in Kock and later in Puławy, near Lublin. He was the right hand of his father in managing all his affairs, including the publication of the pamphlet "Shalom Yerushalayim" and the establishment of the "Thousand Association" to purchase land in Eretz Israel.

=== In Sokolow ===
In 1900 he began to serve as rabbi in the town of Sokolow, a position he held for 40 years. After his father's death in 1905 he began to serve as Admor alongside his brothers Moshe Mordechai and Tzvi Hirsch, but he was considered the principal among them. Many Hasidim came to his court in Sokolov. He led them harshly in the manner of Kotsk Hasidism and demanded Torah study and spiritual elevation. He devoted most of his time to guiding the Hasidim in the service of God, along with receiving the masses who would come to him to be blessed and receive advice. His home in Sokolow had a large library that contained thousands of books that he would purchase on his many travels.

=== Rosh Yeshiva ===
As soon as he arrived in Sokolow he opened a yeshiva for the boys in the town's synagogue. In the early years he himself taught the students, and later appointed additional Ramim to help him. During the First World War the students left and the yeshiva was closed. Morgenstern himself moved to Warsaw, like other Admorim and rabbis from all over Poland, and after the war he reopened the Yeshiva and even expanded it and established it as "Beith Yisrael" after his father. His son Moshe David headed the yeshiva. In 1920, the yeshiva was closed again following the Polish-Soviet War, and a year later he re-established the yeshiva for the third time, initially with a few students, but later the yeshiva grew to hundreds of students. He himself was very involved in the life of the yeshiva and its management, both on the spiritual and economic sides.

=== Public activity ===
Morgenstern believed that every rabbi in Judaism bears public responsibility, must give his opinion on general matters, and is not permitted to shut himself in his four cubits. From the very beginning of his leadership, he was involved in general public affairs in Poland, and was famous as a speaker, organization man and a successful writer. He was in touch with all the leaders of Polish Jewry at the time, including Elchanan Wasserman, Menachem Zemba and others. Already in 1910 he was elected to participate in the delegation of rabbis from Poland to the Rabbinical Committee in Petersburg, which was convened by Tsar Nikolai and attended by the most important rabbis of the time. He was one of the founders of Agudath HaRabbanim in Poland and served as its acting vice president.

In 1919 he joined the "Shlomei Emunei Yisrael" association, which preceded the Agudath Israel movement in Poland. He later became a member of the Moetzes Gedolei HaTorah of Agudath Israel, and was a partner in all the movement's conventions. He argued that ultra-Orthodox Judaism must fight "elements that are not loyal to the Torah," and that it must not remain silent as it has done until then. He took part in all the conferences and conventions of the movement, and worked hard to recruit supporters and establish branches throughout Poland. His articles were published in newspapers and magazines, in which he called for "all those who feared - under the banner of Agudath Israel World! Whomever from ourselves is for G-d, he should come and unite with us." He supported the development of haredi literature that would suit the younger generation, and pointed to the difference between previous generations that did not need reading books other than sacred books. In 1919 he was one of the founders of the "Mesivta" in Warsaw.

Like his father he also supported the settlement of the Land of Israel, but he emphasized that the building of the land could only be according to the Torah. For this reason, he strongly opposed the secular Zionist movement. In 1924 he visited Eretz Israel together with a delegation from the Moetzes Gedolei HaTorah, which included Rav Avraham Mordechai Alter (the Imrei Emes) of Gur, his brother-in-law Rav Chanoch Tzvi Levin of Bendin, and Reb Yitzhak-Meir Levin. The delegation met with the High Commissioner Herbert Samuel and with the leaders of the Jewish community in Israel and tried to bring peace between Abraham Isaac Kook's circles and those of Yosef Chaim Sonnenfeld. During the visit, which lasted over six weeks, they toured the country's cities Jerusalem, Safed, Hebron, Tiberias and Tel Aviv, and met with Kotzk Hasidim who made aliyah to Israel on the orders of his father. Following the visit, he became even more fond of the Land of Israel and called on his followers to immigrate to Israel. He also tried to renew his father's activity and establish a colony of Sokolov Hasidim in Eretz Israel, but these plans were not implemented. Aharon Sursky presents the testimony of his disciple, Shimon Wasserzog, according to which he said in 1935 that it seems that from heaven, the great sages were misled in the Land of Israel, and God's will was that the land be built by non-observant Jews.

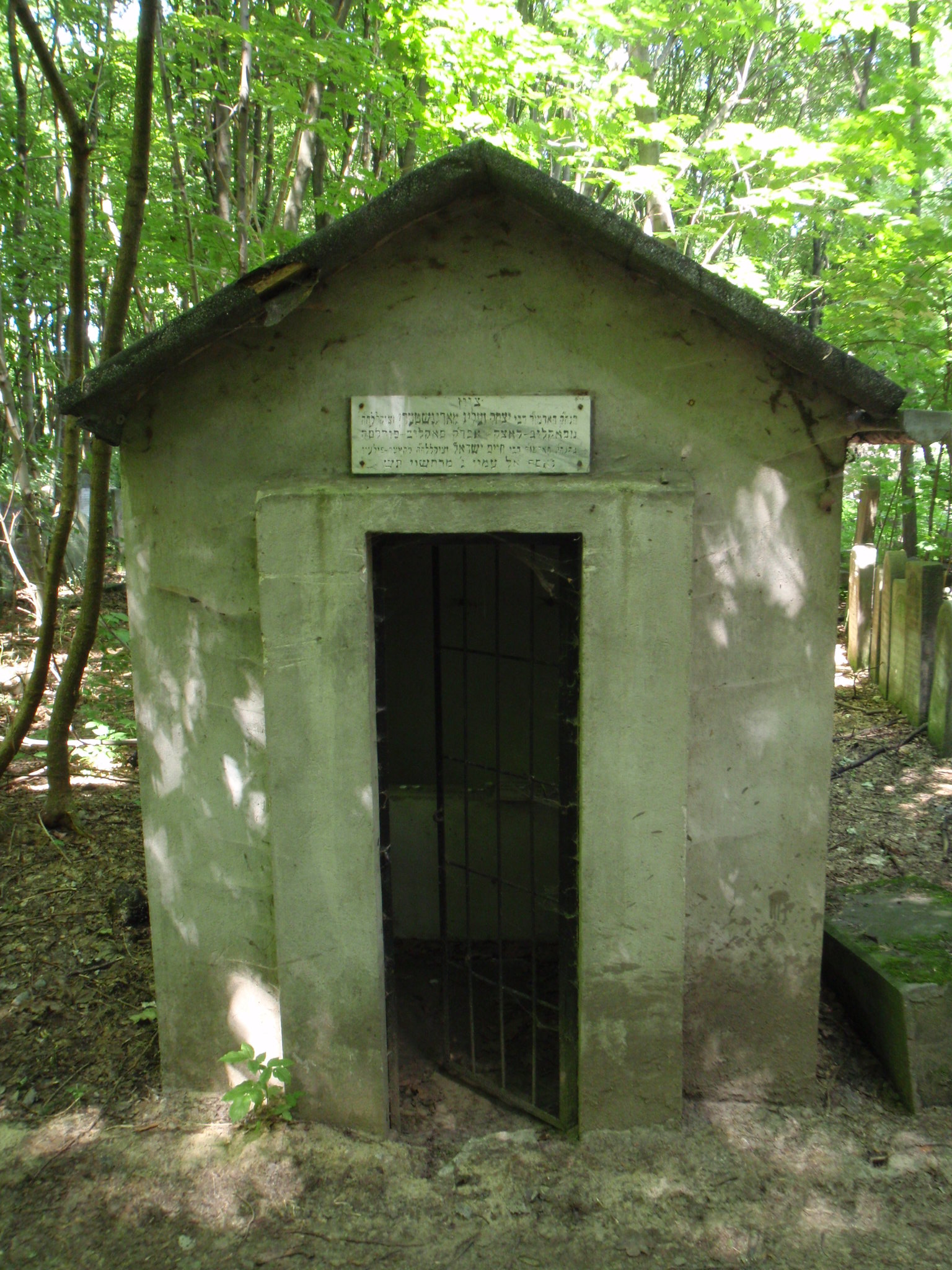
The Ohel at the grave of the Admor of Sokolow in the Jewish cemetery of Warsaw

=== His last years ===
In the last ten years of his life he was sick with various illnesses. Shortly before the outbreak of World War II, he moved to the resort town of Otwock near Warsaw. In September 1939, the Germans entered Otwock and began to abuse the Jews. On Yom Kippur (September 23, 1939), his eldest son, who served as a rabbi in Vengrov, near Warsaw, was murdered after being abused by the Germans in the city square.

Morgenstern died on the 3rd of Cheshvan 5700 (October 16, 1939). His coffin was brought to Warsaw and he was buried in the city's Jewish cemetery. After his death, his son, Rabbi Binyamin Paltiel, was appointed his replacement, who was deported to Auschwitz in 1945, where he was murdered.

== Descendants ==
- Mendele - a rabbi in Węgrów. He was murdered in the Holocaust. Father-in-law of Ya'akov David Baruch of Palinza-Vorka.
- Moshe David - died in his youth in Warsaw, in 1938
- Binyamin Paltiel - presided over his father's yeshiva. From 1932 he served as rabbi of Sterdyń, near Sokolow. He was the son-in-law of Rabbi Yosef of Amshinov. After the death of his father he was crowned his successor. He was murdered in Auschwitz shortly before the camp was liberated. (Note: During the Holocaust he escaped to Warsaw and after the revolt was deported to Auschwitz, where he died in late 1944.)
- Esther, wife of Reuven Baruch Rabinowitz, son of Shraga Yair Rabinowitz, of the family of the Yid Hakudosh from Peshischa.
- Taba, the wife of Pesach Shneur of Kurów.
- Rachel, wife of Yehudah Leib Eiger, son of the Admor of Lublin Azriel Meir Eiger.
- Beila Rahma, wife of Nachum Mordechai Perlov, Rebbe of Novominsk. Their son was Yaakov Perlov, Rebbe of Novominsk, one of the leaders of Moetzes Gedolei HaTorah in the United States.
- Yocheved, wife of Avigdor Jakubowicz of Łódź.
- Rivka, the wife of Israel Aharon Bornstein, son of the Admor of Sochaczew Shmuel Bornstein, author of Shem MiShemuel.
- Sara, the wife of her relative Benjamin Morgenstern, son of Ya'akov Aryeh Morgenstern of Wyszków.
- Leah, the wife of Aharon-Ya'akov Greenberg, who served as a Knesset member on behalf of the Mizrachi party.

His grandson Mendel Meir Morgenstern, son of his son Moshe David, escaped from Poland under the command of his grandfather, and served as Rebbe of Kotzk-Sokolov. For many years he lived in Tel Aviv, and in the 1990s he moved to Bnei Brak and opened a Beit Midrash there. He published some of his grandfather's surviving letters in a book called She'erit Yitzchak.
