= Halukka =

Charity that supported Jewish residents of the Yishuv

The Halukka
- חלוקה
- Headquarters: Jerusalem, Ottoman Empire
- Region served: Levant, Italy, Germany, France, Netherlands, England, Russia, Poland, America
- Methods: Fundraising, donations, charity boxes
- Key people: Joseph Caro, Moses Hagiz

The halukka, also spelled haluka, halukkah or chalukah (Hebrew: חלוקה, meaning distribution), was an organized collection and distribution of charity funds intended for Jewish residents of the Land of Israel (Eretz Yisrael or the Holy Land).

== General method of operation ==
Sympathizing Jews in a diaspora city or district would form a standing committee, overseen by a gabbai, to manage collections and send funds semiannually to the Halukkah managers in Jerusalem. The distribution policy typically divided funds into three equal parts: one-third for yeshiva scholars, one-third for poor widows, orphans, and temporary relief for helpless men, and the final third to cover Jewish community expenses. These distributions usually occurred semi-annually before the Passover and New-Year festivals.

The Jerusalem management deployed representatives known as meshulachim (Heb. משולחים; sing. "meshulach", Heb. משולח) on fundraising missions throughout regions such as the Levant, Italy, Germany, France, the Netherlands, England, Russia, Poland, and America.

One universal and passive method of fundraising was the introduction of the household and synagogue 'charity-box,' an innovation of late seventeenth-century meshulachim, frequently labeled so that the charity be given in memory of Rabbi Meir Ba'al ha-Nes.

== Origin ==
The custom of collecting funds in the Diaspora for Jewish residents in the Land of Israel may date back to the earliest Rabbinical period, when the Jewish academies in Eretz Israel were supported in large part by voluntary contributions from congregations elsewhere.

The term "messenger of Zion" ("sheliah Tziyyon", Heb. שליח ציון) was applied during the Amoraic era (fourth century CE) to Rabbi Hama ben Ada, who traveled between Babylon and Eretz Israel, delivering decisions and messages, and probably soliciting relief.

There exists a scholarly historical dispute whether Rabbi Yechiel of Paris transferred his yeshiva from Paris to Acre around 1257 or not. According to the opinion that he did emigrate, along with 300 disciples, they soon found themselves without means of support, and that one Rabbi Yaakov haShaliach was then sent to solicit relief in the Ottoman lands. This would make R' Yaakov the first documented meshulach.

During the famine of 1441, the Jewish community of Jerusalem sent a meshulach, whose name is curiously recorded as Esrim veArba'ah (a surname, and not, as Heinrich Graetz supposes, a title of honor indicating his knowledge of the 24 books of the Bible) to European countries. The meshulach was directed to go first to a Jewish central committee located in Constantinople in order to obtain necessary credentials. However, Constantinople and Jerusalem were at the time under the jurisdiction of the warring states of Turkey and the Egyptian Mamelukes, so the committee chairman, Moses Capsali, was prohibited under Turkish law from allowing money to be imported to Jerusalem.

=== Ruling of Rabbi Joseph Caro ===
Rabbi Joseph Caro of Safed (d. 1575), author of the authoritative code of Jewish Law, the Shulkhan Arukh, ruled that residents of Jerusalem and of the Holy Land have a superior claim upon Jewish charity. The prior, longstanding, and still legitimate opposing view is that residents of one's own city or adopted country have the superior claim. Both views are based on Deuteronomy 15:7, which refers to supporting the poor person "within any of your gates, in your land". Caro's ruling was based on the presumption that the only land which God gave the Jewish people was the Holy Land.

== Meshulachim in the 17th century ==
=== Takkanah of 1625 ===
To provide for a permanent increase of the haluḳḳah, the Jewish communities of Galilee, early in the seventeenth century, adopted a rabbinic ordinance ("takkanah") invalidating any will not made in the presence of the ַParnas; this had the effect of reminding testators of their duty toward the community of Jerusalem. Another takkanah was afterwards issued which practically amounted to a confiscation, for the benefit of the halukkah, of the chattels, money, and accounts of a deceased Jew who left no resident heirs. There were many evasions, and in several instances the well-to-do, before taking up their residence in the Holy Land, stipulated a certain sum which was to be paid to the community upon their death in place of the fulfilment of the decree. This so-called "inheritance tax" was strenuously opposed by the richer classes, and it was spasmodically abolished and reenacted. The income from this tax, however, never amounted to one-third of the halukkah, and to supply the deficiency there was no alternative but to resort to the meshulachim, who as a result became so numerous, and such frequent visitors in the European congregations, that they were regarded as wandering tramps, a nuisance and a reproach.

Moses Hagiz, a typical meshulach, deplores the low estimate of the meshulach entertained by the general public, and in reply to a Spanish contributor, (1) shows why the Holy Land is religiously superior to other countries, (2) urges the duty of settling there even prior to the fulfillment of the prophecies, (3) speaks of the calamities and tribulations of the Jews in Jerusalem, and (4) explains why the funds contributed in all parts of the world are insufficient. Referring to the meshulachim, he says: "They are sent abroad to acquaint our people in foreign countries of Jewish conditions in the Holy Land, and to enlist sympathy and support for the standard-bearers of the Tabernacle of God, who keep alive Jewish hopes and inspirations in the Land of Israel." He points out that the fact that "Christians will remit thousands of pounds annually for the maintenance of a Christian settlement is a challenge to the Jews who neglect to provide for the beloved sons of Zion."

Hagiz estimated the appropriation of the halukkah for 1,500 souls in Southern Syria, including 1,000 in Jerusalem, to be 10,000 lire. Toward this sum there was an income from communal taxes of 2,000 lire; from legacies 2,000 lire; collected by meshulachim 2,000 lire; leaving a deficiency of 4,000 lire; Jewish indebtedness already amounted to sixty thousand "shekalim" (florins?). Hagiz was aware of the fact that the meshulachim were not liked, that they were abused no less than were the sages in Jerusalem, who were suspected and accused of "leading a luxurious life and spending the funds of the halukkah in drinking coffee and smoking tobacco." Nevertheless, he was ready to state under oath that the halukkah barely supplied one-third of their actual necessaries of life. The main sources of the halukkah at that time in Europe were London, Amsterdam, Venice, and Leghorn.

=== Borrowing from Gentiles ===
To meet the drain on the halukkah, the Jerusalem Jewish community borrowed from Gentiles at an enormous rate of interest, up to 45% per annum, mortgaging their communal property; and when they failed to meet the obligations at maturity, the leaders of the congregation were imprisoned and held for ransom. Rabbi David Melammed, a meshulach of Hebron, rendered a decision to the effect that inasmuch as the representative Jews of Hebron were held under bail for taxes and other indebtedness of the community, they came under the category of "captives held for ransom," whose claims, therefore, took precedence over all other charitable matters having a special fund for disposal, and were not a perversion of charity.

=== The meshulach's employment contract and compensation ===
The Jerusalem management of the halukkah would typically contractually obligate itself to provide for the meshulach's family during his absence, to advance his initial travelling expenses, and to allow him to keep a 45% commission on all contributions coming directly from him or that were due to his influence, and a 10% commission on all income from his territory during the ten years following his return.

A meshulach would contractually obligate himself to devote his attention and best endeavors: to arousing people to charity by offering public lectures; to urging local gabbaim to increase their remittances, and; to opening up new sources of income. The term of this contract was generally three to ten years, but could be longer. In a mission to an important city, a meshulach might sometimes accept a rabbinate or the position of a "maggid"-preacher. Occasionally, a meshulach would promote a business enterprise. He would also serve as a news-trafficker.

Over time, the position fell into disrepute because some meshulachim thought chiefly of personal gain, and cared little for the cause they represented. Pseudo-meshulachim, who represented no community, but travelled on their own behalf, also contributed largely to bring discredit upon the office and duty they had fraudulently assumed.

== Ashkenazi participation ==
During the middle of the eighteenth century, Ashkenazi Hasidim began arriving in the Holy Land in significant numbers, and began to receive a share of the halukkah. However, they asserted that the share was not in proportion to their numbers. They complained to the Ashkenazi gabbaim of Europe, and eventually created their own hallukah organization, with the aid of the Council of the Four Lands, headquartered in Lublin, Poland. Later, Rabbi Abraham Gershon Kutawer, leader of the Hasidim in Hebron, sent meshulachhim to Metz and diverted the halukkah revenue from that source to his own section of the Holy Land. In a letter of Aryeh Judah Meisels of Apta, written in Jerusalem, the Ashkenazim accused the Sephardim of bad faith, declaring that, in spite of assurances to the contrary, the Ashkenazim were discriminated against and compelled to rely entirely upon their own resources.

The Ashkenazim of Safed remained united with the Sephardim and drew from the general halukkah. A letter dated 1778, and written from Safed by Israel Perez Polotzker to the gabbaim of Vitebsk, Russia, states that their meshulachim came to the house of Baruch Ananio, the head gabbai of the central committee at Constantinople, and received 3,000 lire. From this sum they paid 2,000 lire in taxes to the Pasha and 250 lire for meshulachim expenses, with the balance (750 lire) going to the halukkah. In the credentials issued to Rabbi Abraham ha-Kohen of Lask, a Jerusalem meshulach sent to Poland in 1783, the Sephardic central committee writes that Ashkenazim in the Holy Land were taken care of and given a proportionate share of the halukkah.

=== Tiberias Hasidim ===
A group of the hasidim from South Russia settled in Tiberias. Their leader, Rabbi Menahem Mendel of Vitebsk, sent a meshulach regularly to Poland and Volhynia, and in a businesslike manner rendered receipts for past donations signed by the leaders in Tiberias, with requests for further assistance. Contributions poured in, and the only difficulty experienced by the meshulach was the safe delivery of the funds to Tiberias and Jerusalem, as the roads via Constantinople were infested by bands of robbers. He had to wait sometimes for three or four months for a protected vessel sailing from Constantinople to Haifa or Acre; and thence a safe-conduct with armed soldiers to Tiberias and Jerusalem was necessary. Meanwhile, the halukkah being exhausted, the Hasidim had to borrow money in anticipation of the next remittances. The requirements of the halukkah at that time exceeded 700 ducats.

A subscription fund-raising campaign for the halukkah was introduced by Rabbi Abraham Kalisker, leader of the Hasidim in Tiberias. He secured the assistance of Rabbi Mordecai of Niesvizh, who issued a proclamation, dated "22 Adar I., 5556 1796," and addressed to all Jews of Poland, imploring every male and female, adult and minor, whether living in cities or villages, to donatee a fixed sum every week for the support of their countrymen, who had settled in the Holy Land. The amount was to be paid quarterly, in addition to funds raised at weddings, circumcisions, and other religious rejoicings. This proclamation was approved by other rabbis in Poland, and the result was a substantial increase in the halukkah.

=== Safed Perushim ===
In 1801, about two dozen Ashkenazi Perushim, disciples of Rabbi Elijah of Vilna, led by Rabbi Menahem Mendel of Shklov and Rabbi Yisroel ben Shmuel of Shklov, emigrated from Lithuania to the Holy Land, and joined the rolls of the needy at the trough of the halukkah. When their share of the halukkah proved inadequate, Rabbi Israel appointed himself the meshulach for Lithuania and Belarus, and succeeded in establishing an adequate share for his group. The halukkah of the Perushim was increased by Rabbi Aryeh Loeb Katzenellenbogen of Brest-Litovsk and by Rabbi Chaim of Volozhin, who issued proclamations to the effect that the contributions put in the boxes bearing the name of Rabbi Meir Ba'al HaNeis should not be used for candles in the synagogues, as was the custom in some cases, nor for anything but the specific purpose of supporting the poor in the Holy Land. The headquarters for the halukkah of the Perushim were then relocated from Shklov to Vilna, and a second European headquarters, that of the combined central committee for the halukkah of both the Sephardim and Perushim, was relocated from Metz to Amsterdam.

=== Jerusalem Ashkenazim ===
After 1850, the Ashkenazi congregations (kolelim) of Jerusalem began to splinter, beginning with the ֽֽDutch-German kolel, followed by the Warsaw and the Hungarian kolelim, until there existed no fewer than twenty-five kolelim in Jerusalem. The principal motivation for the splintering was the prospect of enlarging each individual group's halukkah portion at the expense of the general halukkah fund, each kolel claiming an exclusive right to the funds collected from their particular homeland. Additionally, some kolelim instituted new apportionment policies, privileging certain of their beneficiaries ("men of learning and distinction") with an advance share over others (ḳedimah).

=== Ashkenazi Central Committee ===
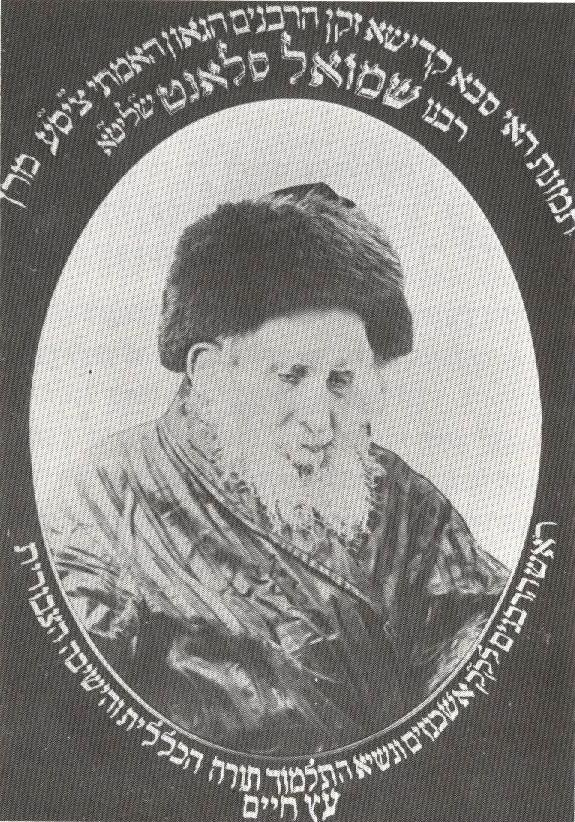
Rabbi Shmuel Salant, head of the Central Committee in Jerusalem

The splintering of the Jerusalem kollelim caused anxiety among those who had no kollel to care for them, and raised concerns in the general Ashkenazi Jewish community regarding community-wide expenses, such as rabbinical salaries, Turkish military taxes, and bakshish for Turkish officials. In response, Rabbis Shmuel Salant and Meir Auerbach organized an Ashkenazi Central Committee ("Va'ad ha-Klali") for Jerusalem, in 1866, to represent the general interests of all Ashkenazim in the Holy Land; the Sephardim continued the management of their affairs under the guidance of the hakam bashi of Jerusalem. The Ashkenazi Central Committee employed its own special representatives, or meshulachim, whom they sent to countries lacking a kolel in the Holy Land. This opened up many new funding sources for the halukkah in South Africa, Australia, England, and particularly in America.

=== Halukka in the Americas ===
Among the early meshulachim to America were Rabbi Moses Malki of Safed (who visited the Newport congregation in 1759), and Rabbi Samuel Cohen of Jerusalem (1775). An interesting meshulach was Raphael Hayyim Isaac Carregal, of Hebron, who was in Newport in 1771 and 1773, after visiting the West Indies (Curaçao, 1764).

By 1871, Sephardi and Ashkenazi meshulachim having found themselves in an unproductive competition for American funds, the two groups arrived at a compromise by which:

1. Jerusalem was to be the point for all remittances;
2. the Ashkenazim in Jerusalem were to receive from the halukkah fund an advance of $500 per annum;
3. 15% of the remainder was to be advanced for the poor of both parties in Jerusalem;
4. the remainder was to be divided: 60% for both parties in Jerusalem and Hebron, and 40% to Safed and Tiberias. Under the terms of this compromise, the distribution by the Central Committee, irrespective of the kolel affiliation, was to be known as the "minor halukkah", or "halukkah ketannah", and averaged about one dollar per person.

=== Accountability and bookkeeping ===
Rabbi Yosef Rivlin, as secretary of the Central Committee and working under the Chief Rabbi of Jerusalem Shmuel Salant, reorganized it in 1885, introduced a modern system of bookkeeping, and issued printed reports of the receipts and expenditures of the halukkah to gabbaim and contributors. These reports, known as "shemesh tzedaḳah" (the sun of righteousness), contain historical items from almost every country in the world.

At the time of the earliest reports, the contributions intended for division between the Sephardim and the Ashkenazim were usually sent to Nathan Marcus Adler, chief rabbi of England, who forwarded the proper amounts to Raphael Meir Panigel, the Hakam Bashi, and Rabbi Samuel Salant, Chief Ashkenazi Rabbi of Jerusalem. The North-American Relief Society for the indigent Jews of Jerusalem, whose members were Portuguese and German Jews, sent about $750 per annum through the chief rabbi of England, with instructions to divide the amount between the two parties. Contributions intended only for Ashkenazim were sent to Rabbi Samuel Salant.

The New York Society for the Relief of the Poor in Palestine forwarded to Rivlin about $1,250 yearly. Baltimore was the next best center, sending about $500 yearly through the congregations Chizuk Emoonah and Shearith Israel. Altogether the American contributions to the halukkah did not exceed $5,000 per annum up to 1885. But through the energetic work of Rivlin the increase of the Ashkenazic halukkah from America was soon apparent, and was largely due to the reports and the activity of the meshulachim, who covered every state from Maine to California.

The agreement of 1871 with the Sephardim had become obsolete by that time, and to strengthen their position in America the Sephardim, following the example of their opponents, began to issue, in 1891, similar reports, entitled "Ha-Moreh li-Tzedaḳah" (The Guide for Charity). The Sephardim, tired of opposing the Ashkenazim in North America, retired, and confined their attention to Italy, the Barbary States (today Morocco, Algeria, Tunisia, and Libya), Turkey, Egypt, Yemen, Persia, India, Turkestan, etc. The result was that the two factions entirely separated as regards the halukkah, each working in its own sphere.

=== Kolel America ===
The American Jews in the Holy Land, following the examples of the other kolelim, strove to organize their own kolel. Joseph G. Wilson, the United States consul at Jerusalem, in his approval of the project dated Feb. 10, 1879, said that "a responsible agency for the distribution of their charities may be the means of great and lasting good," and promised cooperation to the best of his power. But the Central Committee in Constantinople would not allow this new kolel to break off. Funds from America were a great source of income for the general population. If they were to become a separate entity, the small number of Americans living in Ottoman Southern Syria would receive an allotment far greater than the native Jews. The Central Committee instead satisfied the few American claimants for assistance from the general fund.

After several other attempts, the Americans, with the help of the American Consul in Southern Syria (also Consul to Palestine or Consul to Eretz Israel), finally succeeded in organizing their kolel (Aug., 1895), and induced Rabbi Joshua Loeb Diskin in Jerusalem to accept their rabbinate and to receive all contributions for the American kolel. The members in New York contributing to the American kolel were incorporated Dec. 17, 1897, as "The American Congregation, the Pride of Jerusalem." The receipts were, in 1898, $943; in 1899, $1,255; in 1900, $1,762. The central committee, which controlled the general funding of the community and kept the community unified for decades, feared the consequences of the separation. Being unable to convince those clamoring for separation the Central Committee effected a settlement in 1901 on the basis of two-thirds for themselves and one-third for the Kolel America from all collections made in the United States and Canada. The two-thirds were to be used for general expenses, and the balance divided into three parts, one part for the Perushim, one part for the Hasidim, and the remainder for Safed and Tiberias.

== Objections to the Halukkah ==
A good deal of criticism was levelled against the halukkah. When the Jewish Encyclopedia was published in 1906, the Hebrew and Jewish press were almost unanimous in criticizing the halukkah, principally for the reasons: (1) it promoted mendicancy and pauperism; (2) it encouraged idleness and thriftlessness; (3) it fostered divisions between the Sephardim and Ashkenazim; (4) it gave the controlling rabbis too much power to hamper and prevent modern schools for manual labor and secular knowledge; (5) the distributions were made unjustly, with many who do not need or deserve aid being beneficiaries, while others, like the Yemenite Jews and the extremely poor, were ignored. It was even claimed that the halukkah managers opposed the introduction of agriculture as a means of ameliorating the condition of the poor, and that they were hostile to the Zionist movement for fear it might interfere with them and end their power.

All these accusations may have had some basis of fact. The rabbis, however, disclaimed any intention on their part to oppose agriculture and industry for the young and coming generation, so long as a proper religious training was not neglected. They insisted that the purpose of the halukkah was only to give aid to the helpless, and especially to learned men. Indeed, the editor of Ha-Lebanon defended the public support of the halukkah for the residents of the Holy Land by analogy, pointing out that the Christians supported their cloisters and nunneries.

== Modern equivalents ==
The Halukka system continued to exist and splinter after World War I. The importance of Halukka decreased significantly with the rise of the modern Yishuv (settlement). But even after the founding of the State of Israel in 1948, the practice continues among Orthodox Jews under the auspices of several organizations, such as: Kupath Rabbi Meir Baal Haness, Kolel Polen, Kolel Shomrei HaChomos, Kolel Chibas Yerushalayim, and Kollel Zibenbergen.
