= Yoav Yehoshua Weingarten =

Polish rabbi (1845–1923)

Yoav Yehoshua Weingarten (1845-1923) was a prominent rabbi and author of Torah commentaries.

== Education ==
Weingarten was the son of Rabbi Nosson Nota and Rivkah Weingarten.

Weingarten began his studies with Rabbi Zev Nachum Borenstein in Biała, commonly referred to as the Agudas Eizov, but largely developed under the tutelage of his son, Rabbi Avrohom Bornsztain, commonly referred to as the Avnei Nezer. There was only a 6-year difference between Bornsztain and Weingarten. He eventually became one of the greatest authorities in Jewish law at the time.

== Career ==
In 1883, he became the rabbi of Lutomiersk, Poland, moving to Gostynin in 1889. He then became the rabbi of Kintzk in 1894, remaining there until his death in 1923.

== Works ==
Weingarten is the author of a number of texts related to Torah thought:

- Chelkas Yoav (חלקת יואב): a group of responsa
- Kava d'Kashyasa (קבא דקשיתא): a compilation of 103 exceedingly sharp yet-unanswered questions relating to talmudic discourse (the gematria of קבא is 103)
