= Kotzk =

Hasidic dynasty

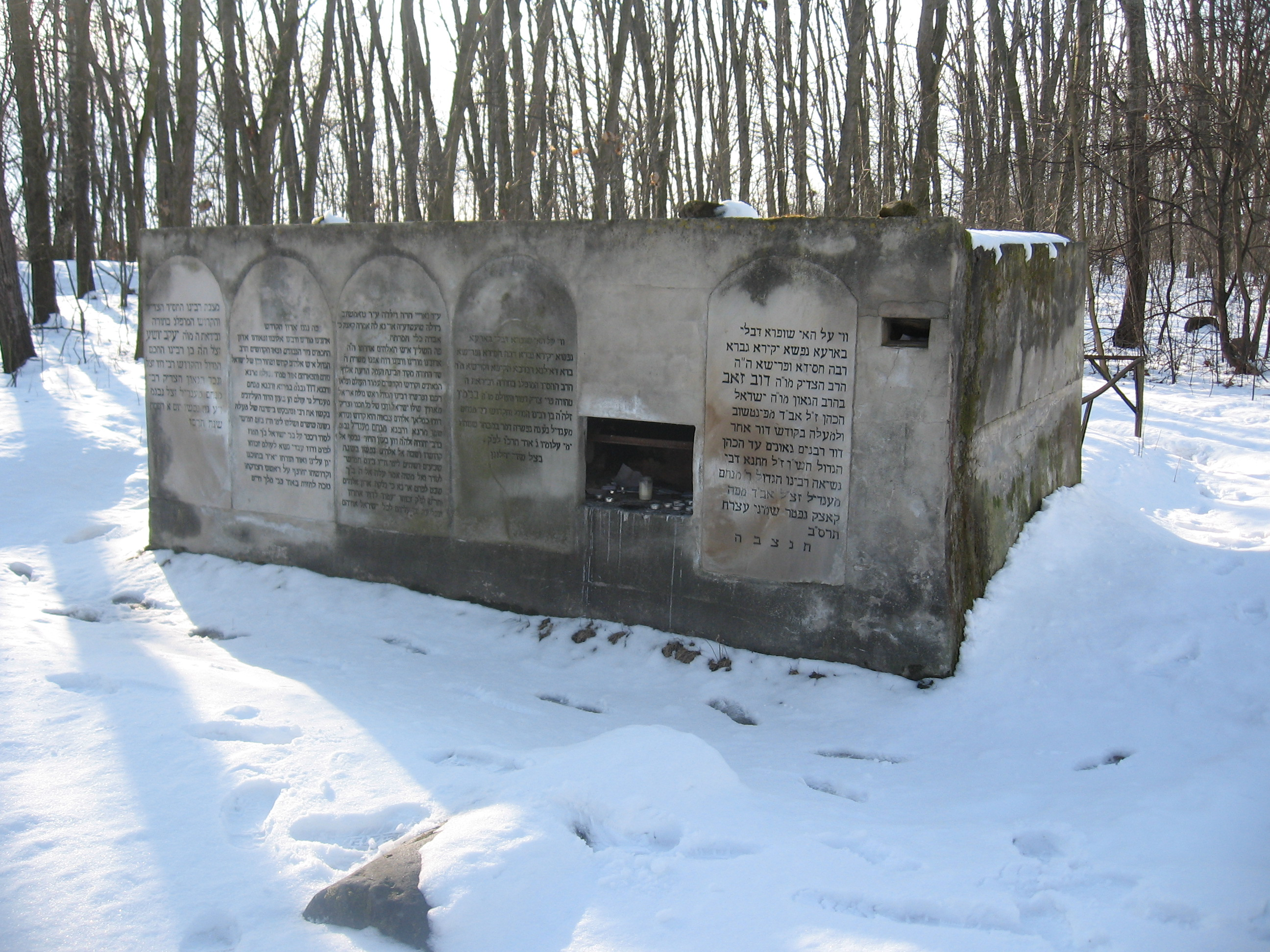
Grave of Menachem Mendel Morgenstern in Kock, Poland

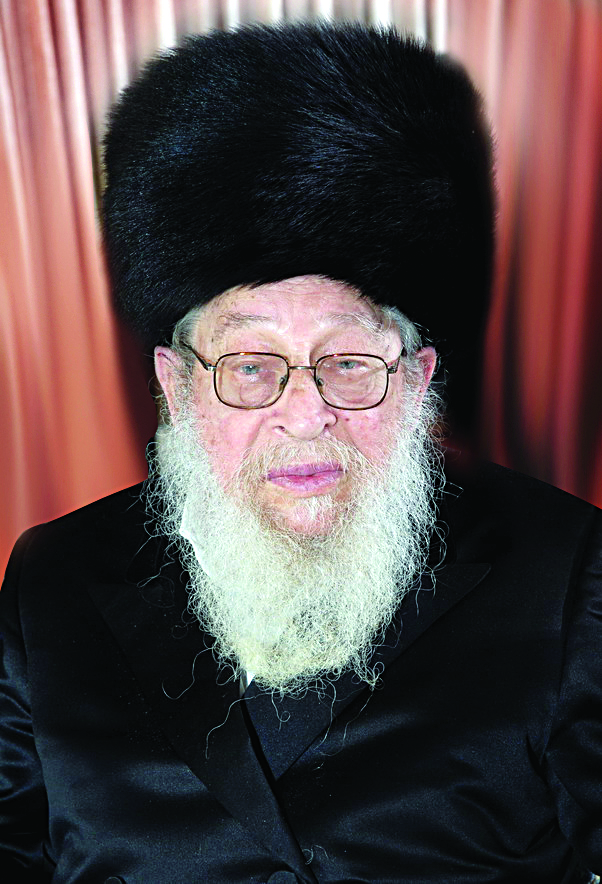
Photo of Mendel Meir Morgenstern the Kotzker Rebbe of Bnei Brak

Kotzk (Yiddish: קאצק) is a Hasidic dynasty originating from the city of Kock, Poland, where it was founded by Menachem Mendel Morgenstern (1787–1859). Kotzk is a branch of Peshischa Hasidism, as Menachem Mendel Morgenstern was the leading disciple of Simcha Bunim of Peshischa (1765–1827). Following Simcha Bunim's death he led the divided Peschischa community, which he eventually incorporated into his own Hasidic dynasty. Kotzk follows a Hasidic philosophy known for its critical and rationalistic approach to Hasidism and its intense approach to personal improvement which is based on a process of harsh constructive criticism and total transparency of self. Kotzk is closely connected to other branches of Peshischa Hasidism such as Ger and Aleksander and is currently based out of Jerusalem.

== History ==
From roughly 1838–1859, Menachem Mendel Morgenstern lived in seclusion from his followers except for his family (which included at least 3 future Rebbes, his son, Dovid, grandson Chaim Yisrael, and son in law Avraham Bornstein), the future Gerer Rebbe who would become known as the Chidushei HaRim, the Gastainer Rebber and the Vorker Rebbe. After his death, he had already amassed a large following. His eldest son, Dovid Morgenstern (1809–1893) succeeded him as the Kotzker rebbe, despite minor criticism from his followers who wanted Yitzchak Meir Alter (1799–1866) to succeed him as Kotzker rebbe. It was around this time that Avrohom Bornsztain (1838–1910), a leading disciple of Menachem Mendel Morgenstern founded the Sochatchov Hasidic dynasty based in Sochaczew. This alongside the rejected leadership of Yitzchak Meir Alter led to several minor splits amongst the community. Before the Holocaust, Kotzk was of the largest Hasidic groups which number in the tens of thousands. Among the last Kotzker rebbes before the Holocaust, was Yitzchak Zelig Morgenstern (1866–1939), the fourth Kotzker rebbe who served as a member of the Moetzes Gedolei HaTorah and his brother Tsvi Hirsh Morgenstern, (1858–1920), Kotzk Lukov Rebbe. During the Holocaust a huge percentage of the community was murdered, including Tsvi Hirsch's successor as Kotzk Lukov Rebbe, his son Joseph Aaron Morgenstern (1891-1942, murdered by Nazis). Following the atrocities of the Holocaust, some of the remaining Hasidim of Kotzk immigrated to Chicago alongside the sixth and last Kotzker rebbe, David Solomon Morgenstern (1904–1962). After his death, the community split into several fractions, the largest of which was led by Mendel Meir Morgenstern (1921–2013) who was a grandson of Yitzchak Zelig Morgenstern and the founder of the Israeli branch of Kotzk based out of Bnei Brak. Descendents of the Kotzk Lukov Rebbe republished/self-published Ateret Zvi, a Torah commentary by Tsvi Hirsh of Lukov, and Joseph Aaron's only Holocaust-surviving son, David J Morgan, (1918–1987) published Truth and Wisdom of Judaism, an English compilation of Torah ethics and Chassidic teachings.

== Succession of Kotzk ==
- Grand Rabbi Menachem Mendel Morgenstern (1787–1859), First Kotzker Rebbe.
  - Grand Rabbi Dovid Morgenstern (1809–1893), Second Kotzker Rebbe.
    - Grand Rabbi Chaim Yisrael Morgenstern (1840–1905), Third Kotzker Rebbe.
      - Grand Rabbi Yitzchak Zelig Morgenstern (1866–1940), and his brother Tsvi Hirsh Morganstern (1858–1920) Fourth generation Kotzker Rebbes.
        - Grand Rabbi Jacob Mendel Morgenstern (1887–1939) and Tsvi Hirsh's son Rabbi Joseph Aron Morgenstern (1891–1942) next Rebbe of Kotzk-Lukov, Fifth generation Kotzker Rebbes.
          - Grand Rabbi David Solomon Morgenstern (1904–1962), and David J Morgan (born Yisrael Dovid, 1918–1987, and author of Truth and Wisdom of Judaism) Sixth generation Kotzker Rebbes.
        - Rabbi Moshe Dovid Morgenstern (1892–1937).
          - Grand Rabbi Mendel Meir Morgenstern (1921–2013), Kotzker Rebbe of Bnei Brak.
            - Rabbi Dovid Morgenstern
            - Rabbi Yitzchak Zelig Morgenstern
              - Dr Joseph J Morgan (1956–), only son of David J Morgan, continues Kotzker tradition in pharmaceutical innovation.
