= Dovid Bornsztain =

Rebbe

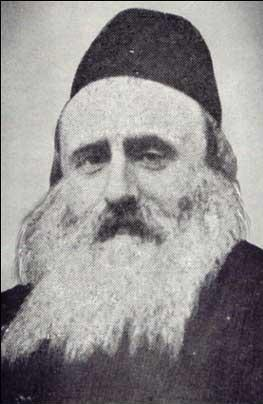
- Title: Third Sochatchover Rebbe

Personal life
- Born: Dovid Bornsztain; 20 August 1876 Nasielsk, Poland
- Died: 17 November 1942 (aged 66) Warsaw Ghetto
- Buried: Warsaw, Poland
- Spouse: Esther Weingut
- Parents: Shmuel Bornsztain (father); Yuta Leah, daughter of Eliezer Lipman of Radomsk (mother)
- Dynasty: Sochatchov

Religious life
- Religion: Judaism

Jewish leader
- Predecessor: Shmuel Bornsztain (Bornsztajn)
- Successor: Chanoch Henoch Bornsztain (Bernstein)
- Began: 1926
- Ended: 1942
- Main work: Chasdei Dovid
- Dynasty: Sochatchov

Dovid Bornsztain (1876 – 17 November 1942), also spelled Borenstein, Bornstein and Bernstein, known as the Chasdei Dovid, was the third Rebbe of the Sochatchov Hasidic dynasty. He succeeded his father, Rabbi Shmuel Bornsztain, as Rebbe upon the latter's death in 1926.

== Early life ==
Bornsztain was born in the Hebrew month of Elul 5636 in Nasielsk, Poland. He was the eldest son of Rabbi Shmuel Bornsztain (the Shem MiShmuel) and his wife Yuta Leah. He had a younger brother, Chanoch Henoch, and at least one sister. At the time of his birth, his grandfather, Rabbi Avrohom Bornsztain, later known as the Avnei Nezer, was serving as Rav of Nasielsk. In 1883, when the Avnei Nezer moved to the city of Sochatchov to serve as that city's Rav, his son Rabbi Shmuel and his family accompanied him and lived in a separate house in the same town.

Young Dovid was taught privately by Rabbi Yitzchak Shlomo Lieberman of Ozorkow, but his primary teacher during his childhood was his grandfather, the Avnei Nezer. From him he learned both the revealed and hidden Torah, along with the Avnei Nezer's unique methodology for understanding the commentary of the Jewish sages, which formed the Hasidut of Sochatchov. Later he learned in his grandfather's yeshiva with students who were much older than he.

In 1891 Bornsztain was engaged to Rachel, the daughter of Rabbi Chaim Yisrael Morgenstern, the Pilover Rebbe. Rachel died that same year, before the wedding took place. Two years later, Bornsztain married Esther Weingut, the daughter of Rabbi Mottel Weingut, a Ger Hasid from Wola Zadybska. Although the custom was for married men to live in or near the home of their father-in-law, Bornstzain and his wife lived in his grandfather's house, where he continued to learn from him.

== Entering the rabbinate ==
Around 1906, (some date this event as late as 1910, after the death of the Avnei Nezer), Bornsztain accepted the rabbinate of Vishgorod. During his time in Vishgorod, he established a yeshiva patterned after the learning style of Sochatchover Hasidut, where hundreds of young men studied.

With the outbreak of World War I, Bornsztain was forced to move to Łódź. At war's end, he decided not to return to Vishgorod, but accepted the rabbinate of Tomaszów Mazowiecki. He was rabbi in Tomaszów in years 1918-1926. Upon his father's death in January 1926, Bornsztain was appointed third Sochatchover Rebbe by his father's Hasidim. This appointment occurred during the funeral itself on 24 Tevet 5686 (1926).

== Third Sochatchover Rebbe ==
The new Rebbe established his court in Pabianice, near Łódź. He also founded a network of yeshivas under the name Beis Avraham (the name of the Avnei Nezer) in Łódź, Warsaw, and other Polish cities. In addition to his duties as Rebbe and rosh yeshiva, he was an active member of Agudath Israel and the Moetzes Gedolei HaTorah. He became known as one of the generation's leading Rebbes.

He often spoke of the idea of settling the Land of Israel and encouraged his Hasidim to emigrate there. He was quoted as saying that he himself would have emigrated there, were it not for the thousands of Hasidim in Poland who depended on his leadership. He himself visited Palestine in 1924 and 1925. On his first trip, which he took with his brother Chanoch Henoch, he put a down payment on a plot of land south of Ramle with the intention of starting a Hasidic settlement. When he returned to Poland to raise the rest of the money, his plan was thwarted by an economic depression that hit Poland shortly after his return. He eventually lost his rights to the land, as well as the money he had invested in it.

== World War II ==
On Rosh Hashana 1939 the Nazis invaded Łódź — then home to the second-largest Jewish community in Europe — and proceeded to snatch men off the streets for forced labor. They found the Rebbe in his home and beat him, cutting off some of his beard. Then they forced him to clean the streets. After this episode, his Hasidim obtained forged documents for him and smuggled him into the Warsaw Ghetto, where he lived incognito. However, his home became a center for Torah study and gatherings of rabbis and activists, and he continued to conduct his tish every Shabbat. He also supervised the education of several hundred Sochatchover yeshiva students in the ghetto and provided solace and encouragement to many.

Before Rosh Hashanah 1940, the Rebbe sent out a letter encouraging his Hasidim and inspiring them to repentance. He was also the first to warn the residents of the ghetto that their lives were in danger. He convened a meeting of rabbis in Tammuz (summer) 1942 to warn them, but many did not believe that the danger was so great.

The Rebbe worked in several factories, the last of which was a shoe factory run by a man named Schultz, who employed other Hasidic Rebbes and prominent rabbis. Out of fear that the Nazis were pursuing him, he moved from place to place constantly. When the deportations began, the Rebbe hid in a shop on 67 Gensha (Gęsia) Street. He died there of heart failure on 17 November 1942 (8 Kislev 5703).

He was the last person to be buried in the Gensha (Gęsia) Street cemetery in Warsaw, and 500 Jews attended his funeral. The day after the funeral, the Nazis closed off the cemetery.

== Legacy and successor ==
The Rebbe's wife, sons, daughters, sons-in-law and grandchildren were all murdered by the Nazis in the spring of 1943. Additionally, almost all of the Rebbe's many manuscripts were destroyed, save for a few pages containing chidushim (new Torah thoughts) on the Passover Haggadah. These pages were later published as Chasdei Dovid together with the ninth volume of Shem Mishmuel, his father's work, which deals with the Haggadah.

The mantle of leadership of the Sochatchover Hasidim passed to his brother, Rabbi Chanoch Henoch, who had established a beth midrash in Bayit Vegan, Israel.

== Quotes ==
- "We humans chase over the world to find things: We climb high mountains; we descend to the depths of the sea; we trek to the wilderness and the desert. There is one place where we neglect to search — our heart. But it is there we will find God".

== Notable Hasidim ==
- Rabbi Yehoshua Moshe Aronsohn, rabbi of Petach Tikva
- Rabbi Aryeh Tzvi Frumer
- Rabbi Shlomo Zev Zweigenhaft

== Rebbes of Sochatchov ==
1. Avrohom Bornsztain, the Avnei Nezer (1838–1910)
2. Shmuel Bornsztain, the Shem Mishmuel (1856–1926)
3. Dovid Bornsztain (1876–1942)
4. Chanoch Henoch Bornsztain (d. 1965)
5. Menachem Shlomo Bornsztain (1934–1969)
6. Shmuel Bornsztain (b. 1961)

== Bibliography ==
- M. Galas, Bornstein Dawida z Sochaczewa, [in:] Z. Borzymowska, R. Żebrowski (ed.), Polski słownik judaistyczny. Dzieje – kultura – religia – ludzie, vol. 1, Warsaw 2003, p. 220 (in Polish).
- Andrzej Kempa, Marek Szukalak, The Biographical Dictionary of the Jews from Lodz, Łódź 2006, p. 34.
- Krzysztof Tomasz Witczak, Słownik biograficzny Żydów tomaszowskich Biographical Dictionary of the Jews from Tomaszów Mazowiecki, Łódź - Tomaszów Mazowiecki 2010, ISBN 978-83-7525-358-0. p. 64 (D. Bornstein's biographical note; in Polish).
