= Judah Leib ben Isaac =

Judah Leib ben Isaac of Szydłów (Szydłowski) (Hebrew: יהודה לייב בן יצחק משדלוב; d. 1730) was an 18th-century Polish rabbi who served as a representative of Kraków in the Council of Four Lands. He is also known by the Hebrew language acronym Rischak (Rav Judah ben Isaac Krakowi).

== Biography ==
Judah Leib was born in Szydłów, Poland to an old and distinguished rabbinic family from Szydłów. His birthplace led to his adoption of the surname Szydłowski (Yiddish: שידלאווער) when Judah Leib moved from Szydlow to Kraków as surnames were not mandatory at the time the toponymic surname was used as an identification marker. His father Isaac was the Chief Rabbi of Szydlow and later Kraków. His mother was the daughter of the Meginei Shlomo Joshua Höschel ben Joseph, and Miryam Hillels. Judah Leib was therefore a descendant of the Rema Rabbi Moses Isserles, the Maharam of Padua Meir Katzenellenbogen, and Rabbi Shimshon Loew, the brother of the Maharal of Prague Judah Loew ben Bezalel. Rabbinic sources differ as to the identity of Judah Leib’s grandfather. According to genealogist Paul Jacobi and the historian Majer Bałaban Judah Leib’s grandfather was Rabbi Uri Shraga Phoebus Szydlowski (unknown - 1702) also known as the judge Feivish as it is written “Dayan Feivish” on his headstone because he was a judge in the rabbinical court of Kraków. The reason for their claim is minutes from the meeting of the Council of Four Lands in 1677 and an approbation (haskama) signed by Judah Leib’s father of the translation of the Hebrew bible translated into Yiddish by Joseph ben Alexander Witzenhausen published in 1679. Rabbi Uri Shraga Phoebus Szydlowski was the father of Samuel ben Uri Shraga Phoebus.

In his early years, Judah served as a rabbi in Szydłów, later serving as representative of Kraków in the Council of Four Lands. After 1715, he became rabbi and head of the Yeshiva at Kraków where he remained until his death in 1730. Judah is known for his many approbations (haskamot) of other rabbinical books and decisions, such as "Panim Me'irot," by Rabbi Meir Eisenstadt (Amsterdam, 1714), and "Berit Shalom," by Rabbi Pinchas ben Pelta (Frankfurt on the Main, 1718). His son, David Samuel, served as the Av Beit Din (presiding judge of the rabbinical court) of Szydłów and Chmielnik, Świętokrzyskie Voivodeship until 1731.

Judah’s wife left a will favoring her younger son, Rabbi David Samuel, over the oldest son, Rabbi Yehoshua of Szydlow. Rabbi Yehoshua accused Rabbi David Samuel of forging the will, leading to a conflict between the brothers. Rabbi Yehoshua joined a Jesuit monastery and converted to Christianity because of the conflict. The conversion led to Rabbi Yehoshua being knighted by the king of the Polish-Lithuanian commonwealth. After engaging in a public debate with his brother Rabbi Josef Szydłowski, the chief rabbi of Pinczow, he returned to Judaism. The dispute reportedly damaged Rabbi David Samuels standing to such an extent that he left his position as the chief rabbi of Kraków.

All six of Rabbi Judah's sons, who were also rabbis and presiding judges of the rabbinical courts in towns in lesser Poland, mainly in Holy Cross Voivodeship-province and surrounding areas, signed the excommunication of the Italian rabbi Moshe Chaim Luzzato, the Ramchal, in 1734 because of the publication of his Kabbalistic books.

All six of Rabbi Judah's sons adopted the surname Szydłowski to commemorate their town of origin.

== Bibliography ==
- Bałaban, Majer (1936). Historja Żydów w Krakowie i na Kazimierzu 1304 - 1868 (eng:) History of the Jews in Cracow and Kazimierz 1304 - 1868. Drukarnia Narodowa w Krakowie.
- Jacobi, Paul (2025). The Jacobi Papers: genealogical studies of leading ashkenazi families volume 4 the Schidlow family. International Institute for Jewish Genealogy, Israel.
- ben Alexander Witzenhausen, Joseph (1679). Torah, Nevi'im u-Khetuvim – Yiddish translation. Joseph Attias, Amsterdam, the Netherlands.
- Friedman, Rabbi Natan Tzvi (1975). Otzer Harabbanim. M. Greenberg Press, Tel Aviv, Israel.
