= Chanoch Henoch Bornsztain =

- Title: Fourth Sochatchover Rebbe

Personal life
- Born: Chanoch Henoch Bornsztain Nasielsk, Poland
- Died: 23 September 1965 Jerusalem
- Buried: Har HaMenuchot, Jerusalem
- Children: Menachem Shlomo Bornsztain
- Parents: Shmuel Bornsztain (father); Yuta Leah, daughter of Eliezer Lipman of Radomsk (mother)
- Dynasty: Sochatchov

Religious life
- Religion: Judaism

Jewish leader
- Predecessor: Dovid Bornsztain
- Successor: Menachem Shlomo Bornsztain
- Began: mid-1940s
- Ended: 1965
- Dynasty: Sochatchov

Chanoch Henoch Bornsztain (Hebrew: חנוך חנוך בורנשטיין; died 23 September 1965), also spelled Borenstein or Bernstein, was the fourth Rebbe of the Sochatchov Hasidic dynasty. He acceded to the position of Rebbe following the death of his older brother, Rabbi Dovid Bornsztain, the third Sochatchover Rebbe, who died in the Warsaw Ghetto during the Holocaust. Rabbi Dovid's children were also killed during the Holocaust, leaving no survivors. As Rabbi Chanoch Henoch had moved to Mandatory Palestine and established a beth midrash in Jerusalem during the 1920s, his assumption of the title of Admor relocated the Sochatchover dynasty from its home in Poland to the new state of Israel, where it flourishes to this day.

== Biography ==
Chanoch Henoch Bornsztain was the second son of Rabbi Shmuel Bornsztain, the Shem MiShmuel, the second Sochatchover Rebbe, and his wife, Yuta Leah. He grew up in the presence of his illustrious grandfather, Rabbi Avrohom Bornsztain, also known as the Avnei Nezer, who founded the Sochatchover dynasty.

In 1924, Bornsztain accompanied his brother Rabbi Dovid Bornsztain to Palestine for the purpose of acquiring land to establish a Hasidic settlement. His brother put a down payment on a plot of land south of Ramle. When he returned to Poland to raise the rest of the money, however, his plan was thwarted by an economic depression that hit Poland shortly after his return. He eventually lost his rights to the land, as well as the money he had invested in it.

Meanwhile, Bornsztain stayed in Jerusalem, living first in the Bucharim neighborhood and then settling in the new Bayit VeGan neighborhood, where he established a beth midrash (study hall).

Upon the death of their father in 1926, Dovid Bornsztain acceded to the leadership of the Sochatchover Hasidim, while Chanoch Henoch Bornsztain continued to live and study in Palestine.

After World War II, when Bornsztain heard about the death of his brother Dovid in the Warsaw Ghetto, he was inconsolable. Later, he accepted the request of the Sochatchover Hasidim to be their leader. He established his court in Jerusalem, preferring to remain in that city even during the 1948 Arab-Israeli war, when his followers in Tel Aviv urged him to join him there.

Bornsztain led the Hasidut until his death on 23 September 1965 (26 Elul 5725). He is buried on Har HaMenuchot in Jerusalem.

His son, Rabbi Menachem Shlomo Bornsztain, succeeded him as Rebbe.

== Rebbes of Sochatchov ==
1. Avrohom Bornsztain, the Avnei Nezer (1838–1910)
2. Shmuel Bornsztain, the Shem Mishmuel (1856–1926)
3. Dovid Bornsztain (1876–1942)
4. Chanoch Henoch Bornsztain (d. 1965)
5. Menachem Shlomo Bornsztain (1934–1969)
6. Shmuel Bornsztain (b. 1961)
