= Shmuel Bornsztain (sixth Sochatchover rebbe) =

Israeli rabbi

Shmuel Bornsztain שמואל בורנשטיין
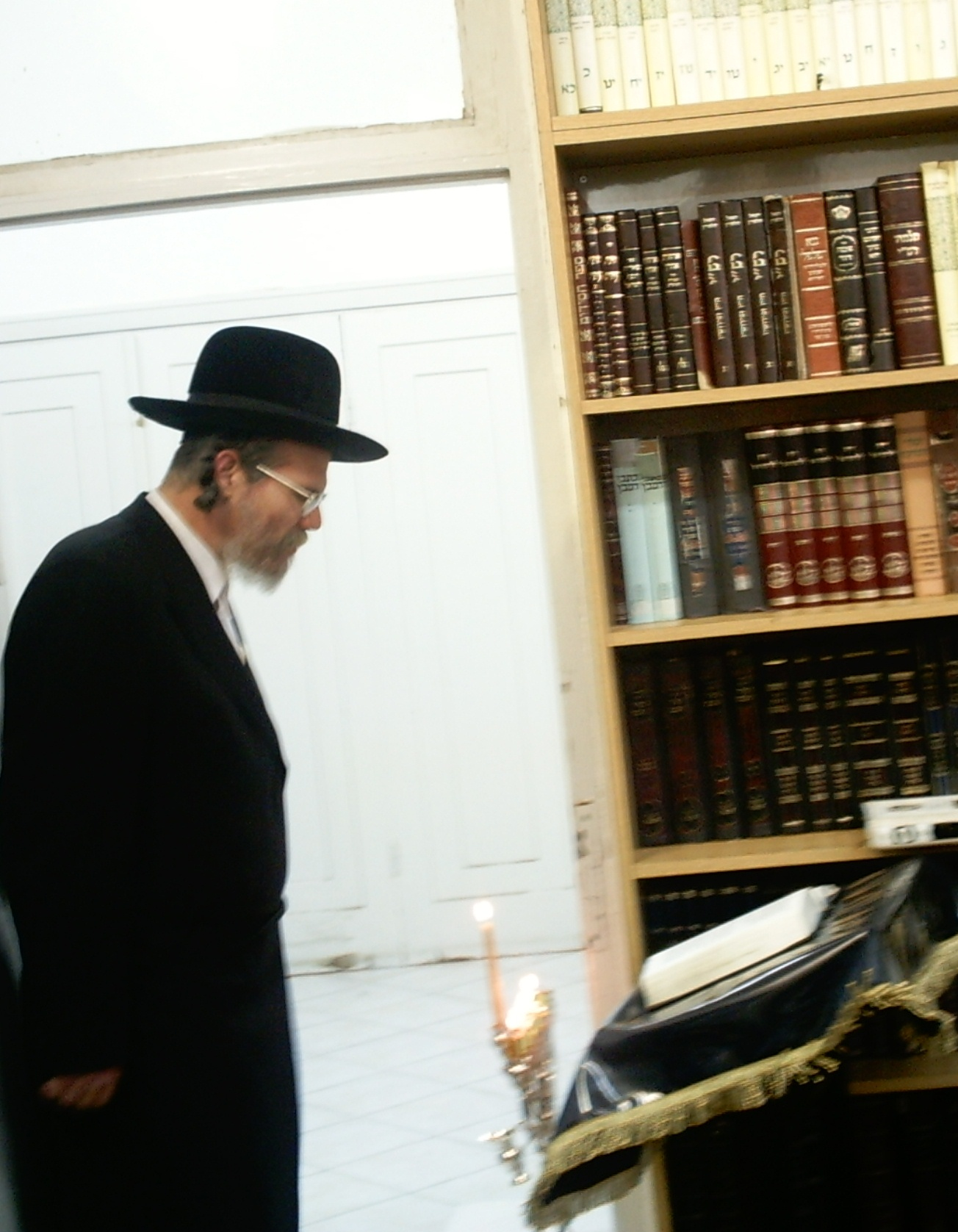
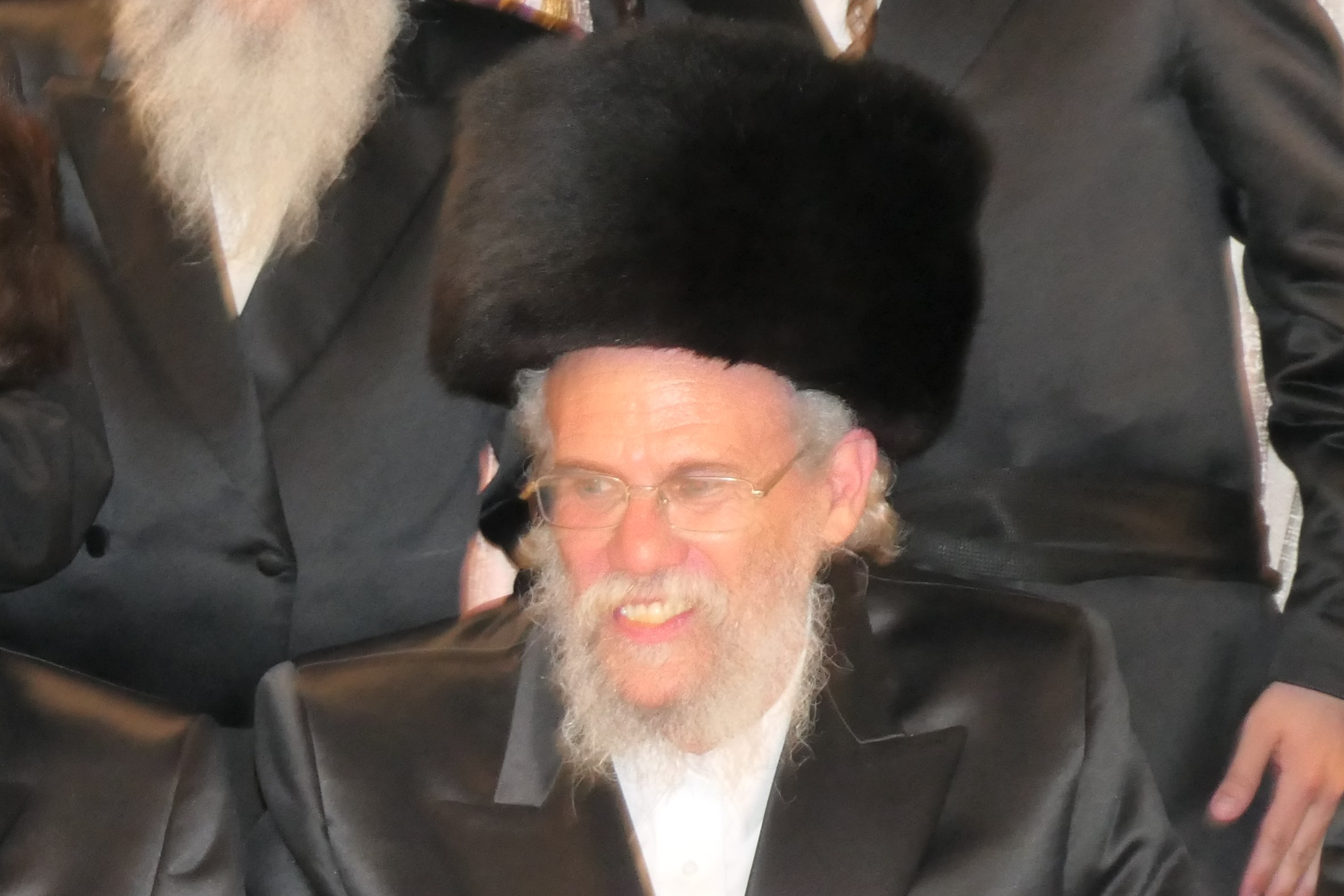
- The Sochatchover Rebbe lighting Hanukkah candles Sokhachov's Rebbe
- Title: Sixth Sochatchover Rebbe, 1987 to present

Personal life
- Born: Shmuel Yitzchok Bornsztain (Bernstein); 1961 (age 64–65) Tel Aviv
- Parent: Menachem Shlomo Bornsztain (father)
- Dynasty: Sochatchov

Religious life
- Religion: Judaism

Jewish leader
- Predecessor: Menachem Shlomo Bornsztain
- Dynasty: Sochatchov

Shmuel Yitzchok Bornsztain (Hebrew: שמואל יצחק בורנשטיין; born 1961), also spelled Borenstein or Bernstein, is the sixth Rebbe of the Sochatchov Hasidic dynasty.

== Biography ==
Bornsztain was born in Tel Aviv in 1961. His father was Rabbi Menachem Shlomo Bornsztain who the fifth Rebbe of Sochatchov, the fifth Rebbe of Radomsk and Rabbi of the Yad Eliyahu neighborhood in Tel Aviv.

Bornsztain was orphaned in 1969 at the age of 8, when his father was killed in a car accident.

Bornsztain attended the Ponevezh Yeshiva.

In the early 1980's, Bornsztain married Rivka Shternbuch a granddaughter of Grand Rabbi Boruch Hager of Seret-Vihznitz. Rivka's father, Rabbi Eliyahu Shternbuch was the Av Beit Din of the Machzikei Hadaas Kehilla. He was a brother of Rabbi Moshe Sternbuch and a brother-in-law of Rabbi Meshulam Dovid Soloveitchik.

Bornsztain's son, Meir, is married to a daughter of Grand Rabbi Nachum Dov Brayer of Boyan.

== Sochatchover Rebbe ==
In 1987, 18 years after the sudden death of his father, Bornsztain acceded to the position of Sochatchover Rebbe.

The Rebbe leads the Sochatchover dynasty from the Bayit VeGan neighborhood of Jerusalem, where the Sochatchov yeshiva, Yeshivat Avnei Nezer, is located. In 2018, he established an additional beis midrash and kollel in Beit Shemesh.

== Rebbes of Sochatchov ==
1. Avrohom Bornsztain, the Avnei Nezer (1838–1910)
2. Shmuel Bornsztain, the Shem Mishmuel (1856–1926)
3. Dovid Bornsztain (1876–1942)
4. Chanoch Henoch Bornsztain (d. 1965)
5. Menachem Shlomo Bornsztain (1934–1969)
6. Shmuel Yitzchok Bornsztain (b. 1961)
