= Menachem Mendel of Kotzk =

Polish rabbi

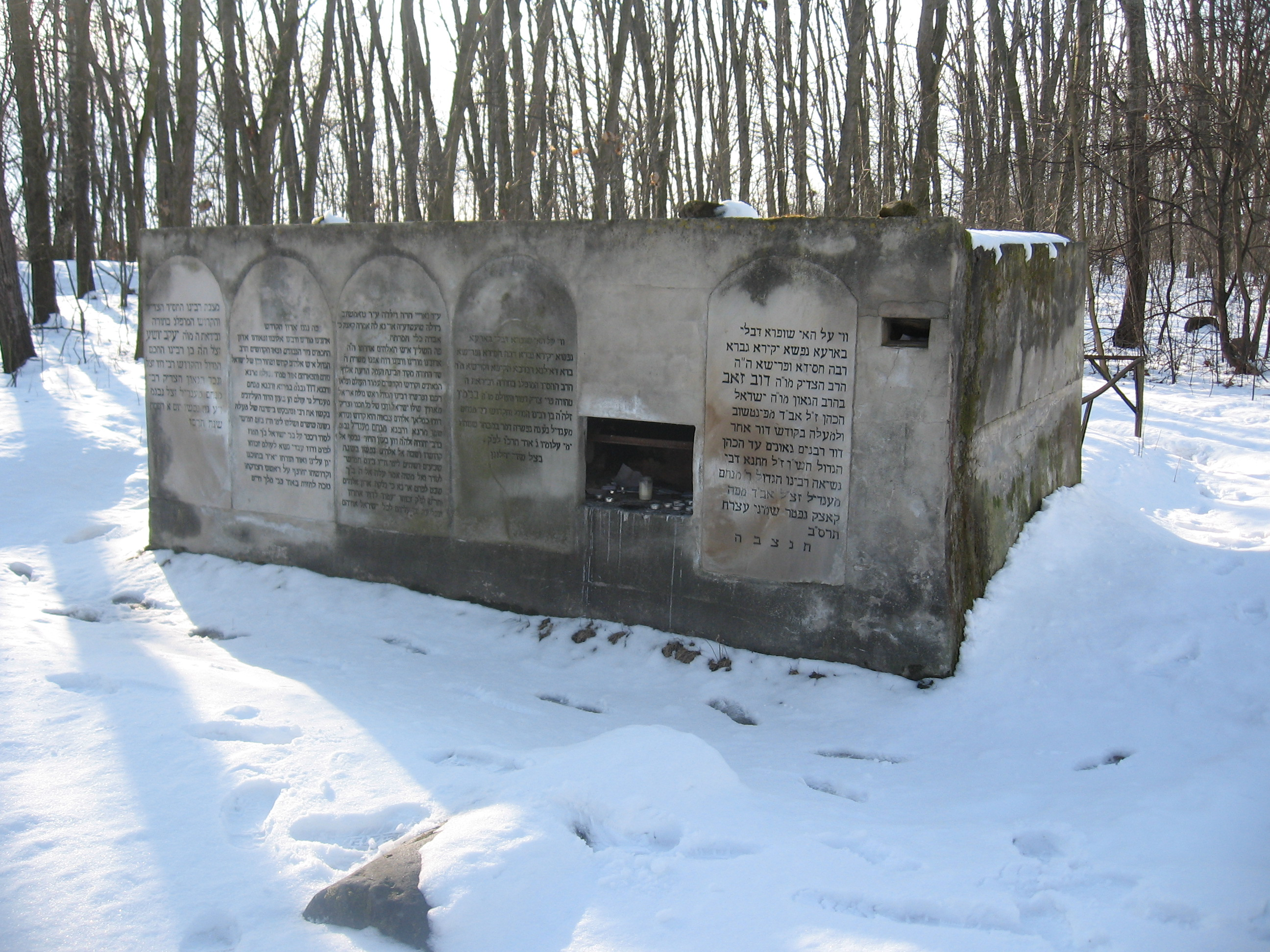
- Grave of Menachem Mendel of Kotzk
- Title: Kotzker Rebbe

Personal life
- Born: Menachem Mendl Morgensztern; 1787 Goray, Poland
- Died: 27 January 1859 (22 Shvat 5619) Kotzk
- Buried: Kotzk
- Spouse: Glike Nay, Chaya Lipszuc
- Children: Dovid Morgensztern; Sara Cyna; Brucha; Binyomin; Moshe Yeruchom
- Parents: Leybush Morgenstern (father); Elka (mother)
- Dynasty: Kotzk

Religious life
- Religion: Judaism

Jewish leader
- Predecessor: (first rebbe)
- Successor: Dovid Morgensztern; Yitzchak Meir Alter
- Began: 1827
- Ended: 1859
- Dynasty: Kotzk

Menachem Mendel Morgensztern of Kotzk (Kock, Poland), better known as the Kotzker Rebbe and the Kotzker (1787–1859) was a Hasidic rabbi and leader.

== Life ==
Born to a non-Hasidic family in Goraj near Lublin, Poland, he became attracted to Hasidic philosophy in his youth. He was known for having acquired impressive Talmudic and Kabbalistic knowledge at an early age. He was a student of Reb Bunim of Peshischa, and upon the latter's death attracted many of his followers. Morgensztern was well known for his incisive and down-to-earth philosophies, and sharp-witted sayings. He appears to have had little patience for false piety or stupidity.

From 1839 he lived in seclusion for the last twenty years of his life.

== Students and legacy ==
The Kotzker Rebbe never published any works. He wrote many manuscripts, but he had them all burned before his death. Several collections of his sayings have been published, most notably Emet VeEmunah (Truth and Faith).

The Kotzker Rebbe's disciple Rabbi Avrohom Bornsztain, author of Avnei Nezer and first Sochatchover Rebbe, was his son-in-law, having married Sara Tzina Morgenstern.

The Kotzker Rebbe is considered to be the spiritual founder upon which the Ger dynasty in Poland is based, through the teachings of its founder and the first Rebbe Rabbi Yitzchak Meir Alter, known for his work as the Chidushei Harim, who was a preeminent disciple of the Kotzker Rebbe and his brother in law through his second wife.

One of his major students was Rabbi Mordechai Yosef Leiner of Izbica.

=== Dynasty ===
- Second generation: His eldest son, Rabbi Dovid Morgensztern, succeeded him as Kotzker Rebbe (1809–1893). His collected works and a genealogy of descendents was published as "Ahavat David" by Boruch Gutter in 2007.
- Third generation: The third Kotzker Rebbe was Rabbi Chaim Yisrael Morgenstern (the Pilover Rebbe, 1840–1905). He wrote Kuntris Shalom Yerusalalayim in 1891, a rare early work of Chassidic Zionism. It was published in "Sheirit Yisrael"
- Fourth generation: Rabbi Yitzchak Zelig Morgenstern (the Sokolover Rebbe, 1866–1939) held he title of Kotzker Rebbe. He was a leader of Agudath Yisrael in Poland, city Rabbi, herbalist, and Head of Yeshivat Beit Yisrael. He visited Israel at least twice. His surviving writings were published as "Sheirit Yitschak". His brother Tzvi Hirsh (1858–1920) was the first Lukover Rebbe, considered to also be a branch Kotzker Rebbe. His surviving writings were republished as "Ateret Tzvi", with an added genealogy, by the Glenner family of Chicago.
- Fifth generation: Rabbi Jacob Mendel Morgenstern (1887–1939) was the Węgrów Rebbe, also a branch Kotzker Rebbe, Another scion was the second Lukover Rebbe, Rabbi Josef Aaron Morgenstern (1891-1942, murdered by Nazis in Treblinka death camp). He relocated his Chassidic Court to Warsaw before WW2.
- Sixth generation: Rabbi David Shlomo Morgenstern was Kotzker Rebbe. He emigrated to London, England and then Chicago, Illinois, where he served the Chicago community. Another was David J Morgan, (born Yisrael Dovid Morgenstern, 1918–1987), author of Truth and Wisdom of Judaism, the only son of the second Lukover Rebbe to survive the Holocaust. After WW2, he lived and taught Chassidic insights and Torah ethics to non-Orthodox Jews in schools in Israel, Belgium, Philadelphia, and Vineland, NJ.
- Seventh generation: includes descendants of the first Kotzk-Lukover Rebbe: (Avraham Meir Morgenstern, Lisa Glenner, Karen Schwartz), and grandchildren of the second Lukov-Kotzk Rebbe, (Dr. Joseph Morgan — founder of KotzkerPhfarma, Rosette Narkunski, Nancy Recant).
- An eighth and ninth generation includes children and grandchildren of the above.

== Some of the Kotzker's sayings ==
- "What kind of God would He be if I could understand Him?"
- "If I am I because I am I, and you are you because you are you, then I am I and you are you. But if I am I because you are you and you are you because I am I, then I am not I and you are not you!"
- "Do not be satisfied with the speech of your lips and the thought in your heart, all the promises and good sayings in your mouth, and all the good thoughts in your heart; rather you must arise and do!"
- "A person must renew himself, and his world with him, each and every day. But one who does not do so, and rather performs his deeds as a mechanical function, does nothing other than the actions of a monkey. Just as this monkey has no personality of his own, but rather copies his own actions and his fellow, so too this person."
- "Not all that is thought need be said, not all that is said need be written, not all that is written need be published, and not all that is published need be read."
- Man must "guard himself and his uniqueness, and not imitate his fellow ... for initially man was created 'in his own image', and only afterwards in the image of God."
- "People are accustomed to look at the heavens and to wonder what happens there. It would be better if they would look within themselves, to see what happens there."
- "Where is God to be found? In the place where He is given entry."
- "You don't love fish. If you loved the fish, you would not have killed it and cooked it on a fire."
- "Just as it is the way of an ape to imitate humans, so too, a person, when he has become old, imitates himself, and does what was his manner previously." In other words, most of us, at some point in life, either consciously or not, become satisfied with who we are and what we've become. As such, we cease to strive toward attaining greater spiritual heights. We are content to live out our remaining days as a mere imitation of ourselves!

== See also ==
- Kotsk

== Sources ==
- Fox, Dr. Joseph (1988). Rabbi Menachem Mendel of Kotzk: A Biographical Study of the Chasidic Master. New York:Bash Publications Inc.
- Oratz, Rabbi Ephraim (1989) And Nothing But The Truth according to the Rebbe of Kotzk. Judaica Press.
- Heschel, Abraham Joshua (1973). A Passion for Truth. New York:Farrar, Straus and Giroux.
- Raz, Simcha, Levin, Edward (trans.) (1995). The sayings of Menachem Mendel of Kotsk. Northvale, N.J.:Jason Aronson Inc.
- Kotzk, Rabbi David of compiled and edited by Boruch Gutter (2007). "Sefer Ahavat David Hashalem (Kotzk)" Includes genealogy of descendants. Self-published via Hadaf Printing, NY.
- Morgenstern, Tzvi Hirsh (1906), "Ateret Tsvi al Ha-Torah" (with Kuntress Zera Kodesh, a genealogy added when reissued as a self-published work by the Glenner Family of Chicago).
- Morgan, David J (1967), "Truth and Wisdom of Judaism" self-published by author in Phila, PA.
