= Kupath Rabbi Meir Baal Hanes =

Jewish charity founded in 1796

Kupath Rabbi Meir Baal HaNess Kollel Polin

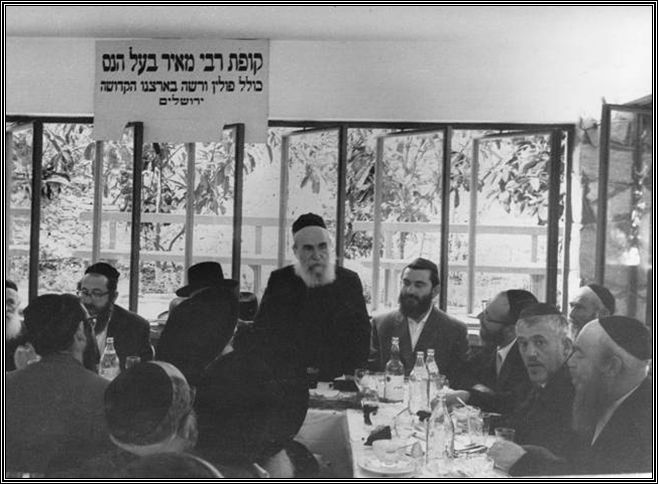
- Rabbi Moshe Feinstein speaking on behalf of Kupath Rabbi Meir Baal HaNess in Jerusalem, 1964
- Formation: 1796; 230 years ago
- Founder: Rabbi Abraham Kalisker
- Founded at: Poland
- Purpose: Charity
- Headquarters: Tiberias, Israel
- Region served: Israel
- Services: Medical Assistance; Unemployment Fund; Ezer Nisu’in; Almanah Support; Newborn Fund
- Website: kupathrabbimeir.org

Kupath Rabbi Meir Baal HaNess Kollel Polin, known also by the initials Kupat RaMBaN is a charity founded in 1796 in Poland. It is named after the Rabbi Meir the tanna.

It was founded by Abraham Kalisker, a rabbi living in Tiberias.

== 21st century ==
Leaders of the organization include rabbis Yitzchak Meir Alter, Meir Auerbach, Chaim Elozor Wax, and Jacob Meir Biderman.

Programs include:

- Medical Assistance – Individuals facing medical challenges who cannot afford to pay their bills receive financial assistance.
- Unemployment Fund – Financial assistance is given to those facing temporary unemployment.
- Ezer Nisu’in – Stipends are given for families marrying off children.
- Almanah Support – Widows receive regular stipends.
- Newborn Fund – Those with newborns are given financial assistance.
