= Avrohom Bornsztain =

Polish rabbi (1838–1910)

- Title: Sochatchover Rebbe

Personal life
- Born: Avrohom Bornsztain; 14 October 1838 Bendin
- Died: 7 February 1910 (aged 71) Sochatchov
- Buried: Sochatchov
- Spouse: Sara Tzina Morgenstern
- Children: Shmuel Bornsztain (Shem Mishmuel); Esther
- Parents: Ze'ev (Wolf) Nachum Bornsztain (father); Dobrish Erlich (mother)
- Dynasty: Sochatchov

Religious life
- Religion: Judaism

Jewish leader
- Predecessor: (first)
- Successor: Shmuel Bornsztain
- Began: 1870
- Ended: 1910
- Main work: Avnei Nezer
- Dynasty: Sochatchov

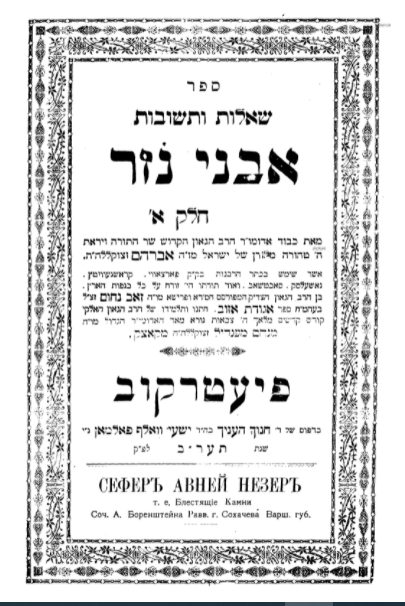
Bornsztain's posthumously published book:Sefer She'elot U-Teshuvot Avnei Nezer

Avrohom Bornsztain (14 October 1838 – 20 February 1910), also spelled Avraham Borenstein or Bernstein, was a leading posek in late-nineteenth-century Europe and founder and first Rebbe of the Sochatchover Hasidic dynasty. He is known as the Avnei Nezer ("Stones of the Crown") after the title of his posthumously published set of Torah responsa, which is widely acknowledged as a halakhic classic. His only son, Shmuel, author of Shem Mishmuel, succeeded him as Rebbe.

== Early life ==
Born in Będzin, Poland on 14 October 1838, Bornsztain was a descendant of the Rema and the Shach. He was the first child of Dobrish (or Doba/Dobela) Erlich, and Rabbi Zev Nachum Bornsztain. Zev Nachum served as Rabbi of Olkusz from 1849 to 1855 and Rabbi of Biała Podlaska from 1855 till his death in 1885. Zev Nachum was the author of Agudat Eizov, and a Hasid of the Kotzker Rebbe. The latter opined that Zev Nachum merited such a son due to his immersion in Torah study on Purim, a time when most people are busy carrying out the many mitzvot of the day.

In his youth, Bornsztain was recognized as an outstanding student with a phenomenal memory. Under the tutelage of his father, who taught him the ways of pilpul, he began writing his own chidushim (new Torah thoughts) at the age of 10.

Bornsztain's health was weak and frail from his childhood. He especially suffered from lung problems. Once when he fell dangerously ill, the doctors forbade him from exerting his mind in Torah study. But the Kotzker Rebbe gave him a blessing for longevity, which was fulfilled in the fact that Bornsztain died at the age of 71.

In his teens, Bornsztain became a close talmid of the Kotzker Rebbe, who chose him as his son-in-law. Bornsztain married the Rebbe's daughter, Sara Tzina, in 1853. Bornsztain and his wife resided in Kock for seven years, until the Kotzker Rebbe's death in 1859. During that time, Bornsztain was known to sleep only two hours each day and dedicate the rest of his waking hours to Torah learning. His only son, Shmuel, was born in Kock in 1857.

After the Kotzker Rebbe's death, Bornsztain became a Hasid of his wife's uncle, Rabbi Yitzchak Meir Alter, the Chidushei HaRim of Ger. Following the latter's death in 1866, he became a hasid of Rabbi Chanoch Heynekh of Alexander.

== Rav and teacher ==
In 1863, Bornsztain accepted his first rabbinical post as Rav of Parczew. In 1867, he left the city due to persecution by those who opposed him and accepted the position of Av Beit Din of Krushnevitz. Here he founded a yeshiva gedola which attracted many top students, including future Torah leaders such as Rabbi Meir Don Plotski, the Kli Chemdo; Rabbi Yoav Yehoshua Weingarten, the Chelkas Yoav of Kintsk; and Rabbi Shaul Moshe Zilberman, the Vershover Rov.

Bornsztain displayed tremendous devotion to his students, with whom he learned for eight hours each day, delivering several shiurim (lectures) during the course of each day. In his introduction to his book, Eglei Tal, he noted that he dedicated all his energies to teaching Torah to his students, leaving the publication of his chiddushim to his old age.

== As rebbe ==
When Rabbi Chanoch Heynekh of Alexander died in 1870, Bornsztain agreed to serve as a rebbe — with one condition: his regular shiurim and learning schedule were not to be interrupted. He also insisted that only those who were well-versed in Torah scholarship should visit him at his court. After a while, his Hasidim noticed that while he answered each petitioner concisely, he did not spend much time with them. When questioned about this, Bornsztain responded: "You should know that for every second that I am disrupted in my learning, they have losses at home, so it is to their advantage that I only hold brief audiences with them!"

In 1876 Bornsztain moved to the city of Nasielsk after the death of that city's rabbi, Rabbi Shmuel Shinover, author of "Romosayim Tzofim". Yet here, too, he encountered opposition from those who wanted him to ease his insistence on following long-standing traditions and minhagim. When the community of Sochatchov approached him to be their Rav and Rebbe, he gladly accepted. He moved to Sochatchov in 1883 and served as its Av Beit Din until his death. Thereafter, the hasidut which he founded became known by the name of Sochatchov, and he was called the Sochatchover Rebbe.

While Bornsztain wanted nothing more than to continue his regular schedule of Torah learning and teaching in Sochatchov, his fame spread quickly. Many difficult halakhic she'eilos (queries) were addressed to him by rabbis and scholars throughout Europe, and he became known as one of the era's leading poskim. To arrive at his psak (halakhic decision), he would first study the sugya in the Talmud in depth, then study the explanation of the sugya by the Rishonim, and then formulate his decision. His responsa also reflect his great humility. While others relied on his psak completely, in some cases he himself wrote that one should not rely on his psak unless another posek was found who ruled the same way.

His responsa, covering all four sections of Shulchan Aruch, were published posthumously in seven volumes by his son and grandson under the title, She'eilos U'teshuvos Avnei Nezer. He became known as the Avnei Nezer after his death.

Bornsztain's other works include Eglei Tal on the 39 Melachos of Shabbat, unpublished sifrei Hasidut, and many writings in manuscript form, including chiddushim on the Rambam. Many of his Torah sayings to his Hasidim appear in his son's work, Shem Mishmuel.

The homilies which he delivered before his listeners on Shabbat were collected and printed after the Holocaust in the book Ne'ot Deshe (two parts) together with the Torah thoughts of his successors as Sochatchover Rebbes. His biography, Abir HaRo'im, was published in Pyetrkov in 1935. Presently, his Talmudic chiddushim arranged according to the order of the tractates are being edited.

== Death and legacy ==
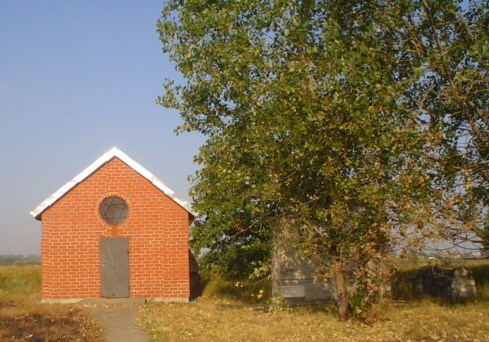
Ohel (gravesite) of the Avnei Nezer and his son, the Shem Mishmuel, in Sochaczew

Bornsztain suffered from a heavy cough in his later years, due to his frail lungs. He died on 20 February 1910 (11 Adar I, 5670) and was buried in an ohel (covered grave) in Sochatchov. His wife, Sara Tzina, died later that year, on 25 December 1910 (25 Kislev, 5671).

His only son, Shmuel, later known by the title of his own work, Shem Mishmuel, succeeded him as Av Beit Din of Sochatchov and as Sochatchover Rebbe. Upon his death in 1926, the Shem Mishmuel was brought to burial in the same ohel as his father. Bornsztain also had one daughter, Esther, who married his younger brother, Rabbi Meir Bornsztain.

The Sochatchover dynasty continues today under the leadership of Bornsztain's great-great-grandson. A Sochatchover Yeshiva, called Yeshivat Avnei Nezer DeSochatchov, operates in Jerusalem under the leadership of Rabbi Moshe Betzalel Weinberg, a brother-in-law of the current rebbe.

== Destruction and restoration of the ohel ==
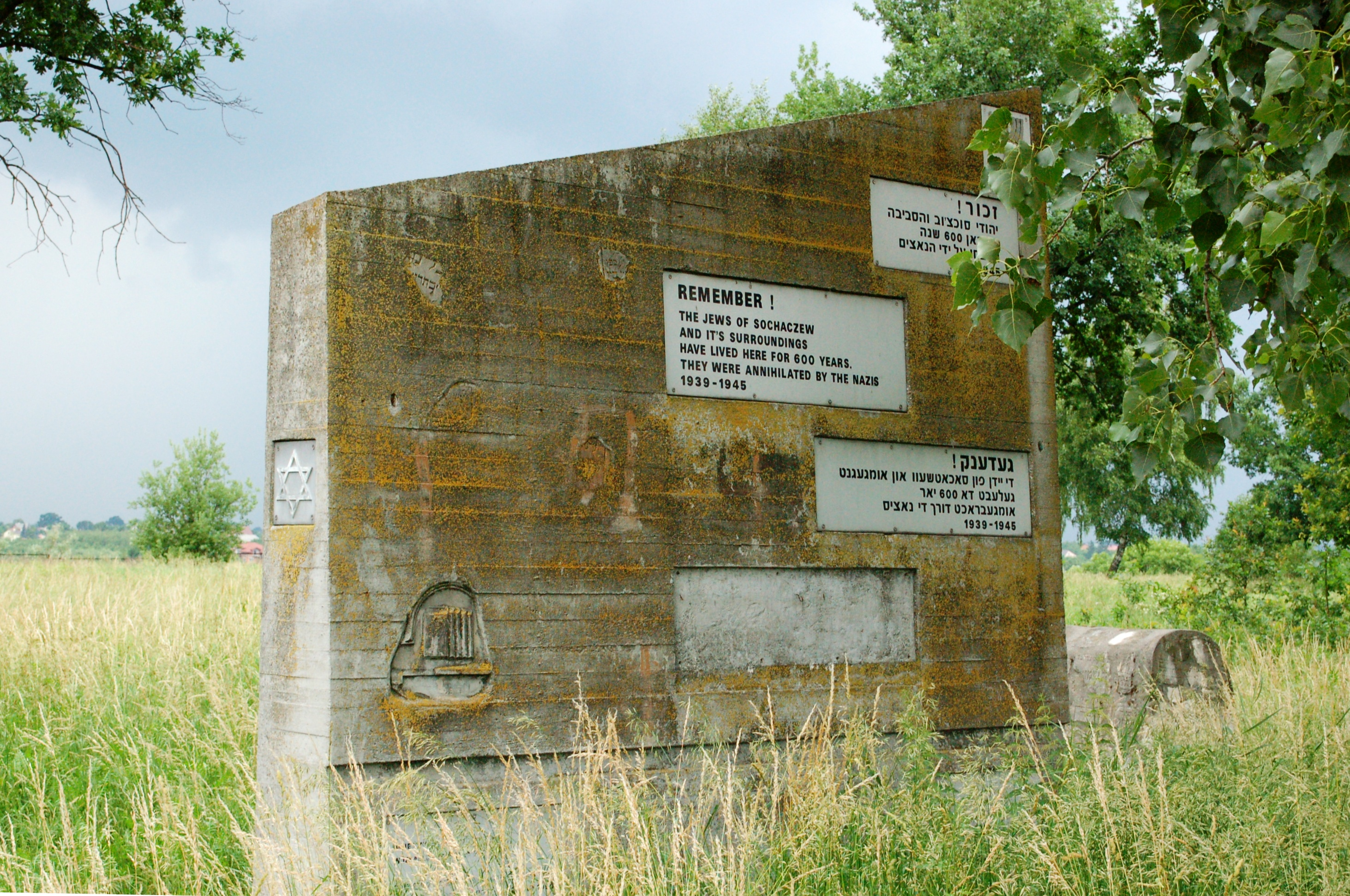
Marker in the Jewish cemetery memorializing the Jews of Sochaczew murdered by the Nazis.

During World War II, the Nazis uprooted all the headstones in the cemetery in which the Avnei Nezer and the Shem Mishmuel were buried and threw them into the river. The ohel of the Sochatchover Rebbes was destroyed along with the rest of the cemetery, turning it into a barren field after the war. During the Communist era, the cemetery was used as a soccer field and as a garbage dump. Though many Sochatchover Hasidim tried to locate the ohel and the graves of the first Sochatchover Rebbes, they were not successful.

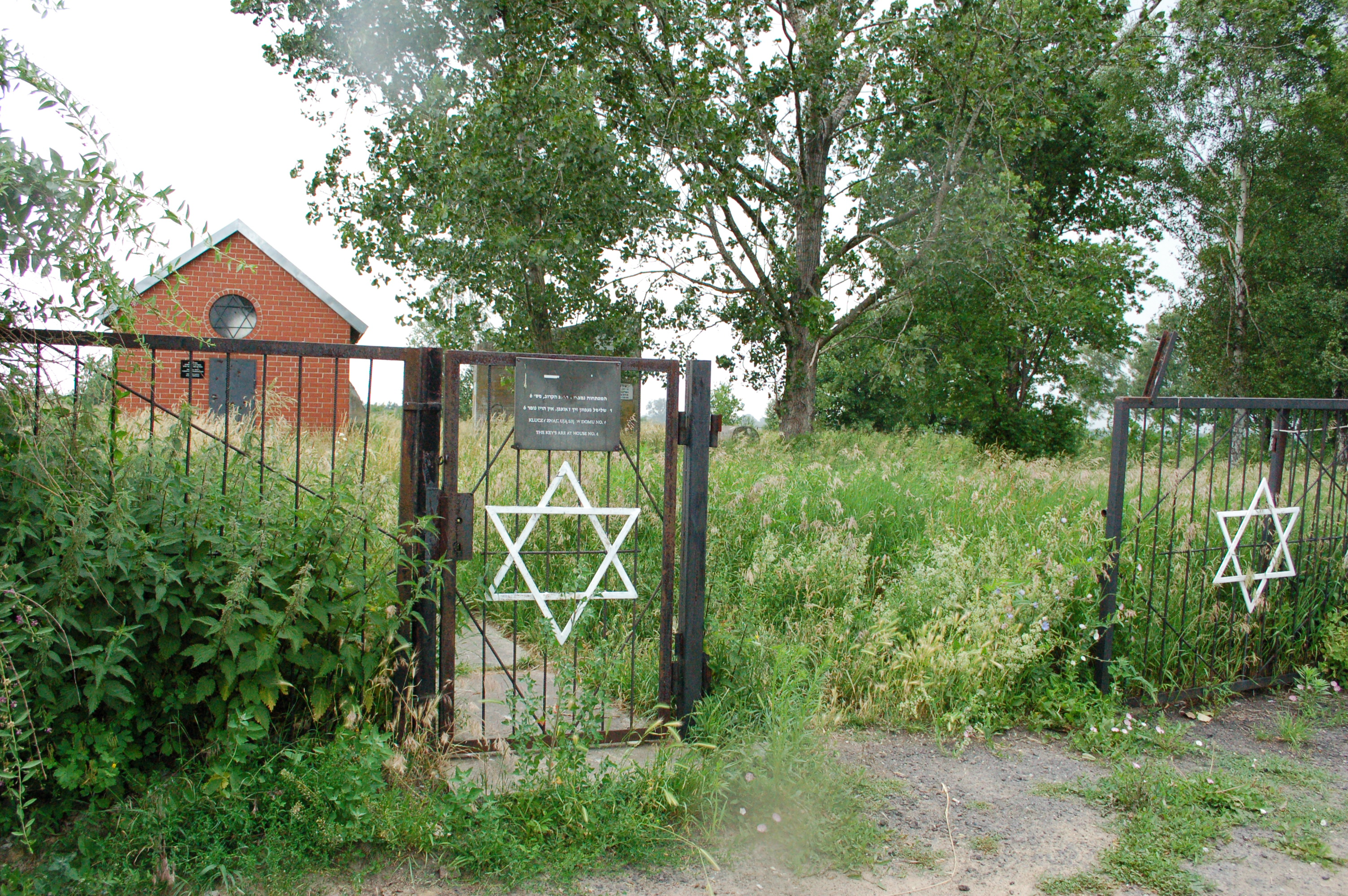
Jewish cemetery in Sochaczew, with the restored, red-brick ohel in background.

In 1991, after the fall of Communism, Yehuda Vidavski, a Sochatchover Hasid from Łódź, who now lived in Tel Aviv, set out to find and restore the ohel. He successfully petitioned the local authorities for permission to erect a fence around the perimeter of the original cemetery, and asked Rabbi Aharon Yisrael Bornsztain, a son of the Shem Mishmuel who also lived in Tel Aviv, for his recollections as to the location of the ohel. Rabbi Aharon Yisrael recalled that it lay 35 meters from the entrance to the cemetery. But although Vidavski hired Polish workers to dig in that area, he uncovered no signs of the ohel. He was similarly unsuccessful in employing a professional who used different kinds of machines to locate graves.

Then Vidavski found an older woman who had lived in that area all her life. When he brought her to the cemetery and asked her if she remembered where the ohel had been, she looked around at all the digging going on and said, "Why are they looking there when the tzadik is buried here?" Digging anew, Rabbi Videvski's workers unearthed remnants of wooden boards, which they later realized was the grave of the Avnei Nezer. Beside this they found pieces of wood from the grave of the Shem Mishmuel. The graves were restored and a new ohel built over them, which was inaugurated in a ceremony led by the present Sochatchover Rebbe, who traveled to Poland from Israel for the occasion in 1993.

== Rebbes of Sochatchov ==
1. Avrohom Bornsztain, the Avnei Nezer (1838–1910)
2. Shmuel Bornsztain, the Shem Mishmuel (1856–1926)
3. Dovid Bornsztain (1876–1942)
4. Chanoch Henoch Bornsztain (d. 1965)
5. Menachem Shlomo Bornsztain (1934–1969)
6. Shmuel Bornsztain (b. 1961)

== Notable Students ==
- Yoav Yehoshua Weingarten
- Meir Dan Plotzky
- Aryeh Tzvi Frumer
- Shlomo Sztencl
