= Sochatchov (Hasidic dynasty) =

Polish Hasidic dynasty

Sochatchov (Yiddish: סאכאטשאוו) is a Hasidic dynasty originating from the town of Sochaczew, Poland, where it was founded by Avrohom Bornsztain (1838–1910). Sochatchov is a branch of Kotzk Hasidism, which in part is a branch of Peshischa Hasidism. After World War I the dynasty was moved to Łódź and, subsequently, to other nearby towns. After World War II the dynasty was transplanted to Israel, where it thrives to this day.

== History ==
=== Leadership in Poland ===
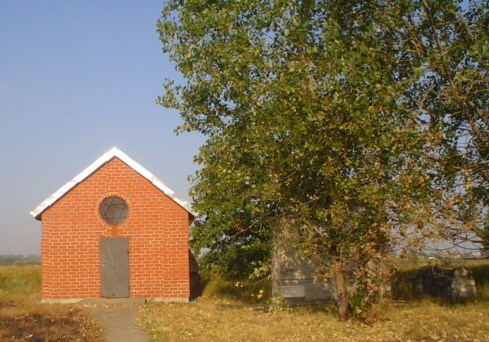
The ohel (gravesite) of the Avnei Nezer and the Shem Mishmuel in Sochaczew.

The founder of the dynasty, Avrohom Bornsztain was a leading posek (Jewish legal authority) in 19th-century Poland. He was a close disciple of Menachem Mendel Morgenstern (a disciple of Simcha Bunim of Peshischa) and married the Kotzker Rebbe's daughter. After the Kotzker Rebbe's death, Bornsztain became a Hasid of his uncle, Yitzchak Meir Alter, the Chidushei HaRim of Ger. Following the latter's death in 1866, he became a hasid of Chanoch Heynekh of Alexander. When the Alexander Rebbe died in 1870, Bornsztain agreed to become a Hasidic rebbe himself. From 1883 until his death he served as Rav and av beis din (head of the rabbinical court) of Sochaczew (Sochatchov), becoming known as the Sochatchover Rebbe. The homilies that he delivered before his Hasidim on Shabbat were collected and printed in the book Ne'ot Deshe. His voluminous responsa on every section of Shulchan Aruch were published posthumously in seven volumes under the title Avnei Nezer ("Stones of the Crown").

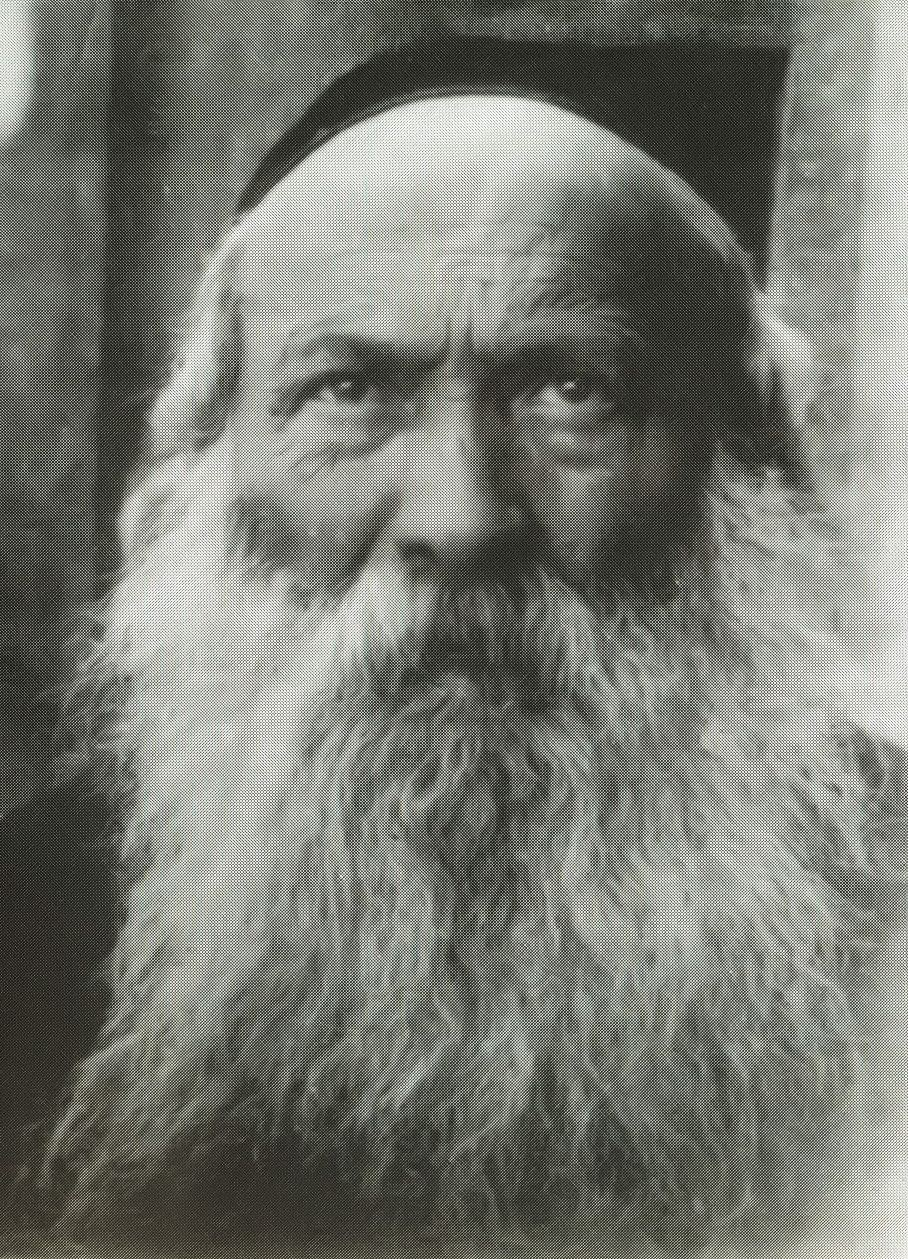
Shmuel Bornsztain, the Shem Mishmuel.

His only son, Shmuel Bornsztain, succeeded him as av beis din of Sochatchov and second Sochatchover Rebbe. From his childhood, Shmuel's primary teacher was his father, and he continued to live near him even after his marriage. Upon his father's death in 1910, he was accepted as Rebbe by all his father's Hasidim. He established a Sochatchov yeshiva, Yeshivat Beit Avrohom, first in Sochaczew and later in Zgierz. He delivered many shiurim (Torah lectures) to his Hasidim on the topics of the weekly Torah portion and Jewish holidays, primarily based on the teachings of his father. These teachings were posthumously published in the nine-volume Shem Mishmuel.

In 1915 the town of Sochaczew was destroyed by the German army and Shmuel re-established his court in Łódź. In 1919 he moved his court to Zgierz, a small town near Łódź. He died in 1926.

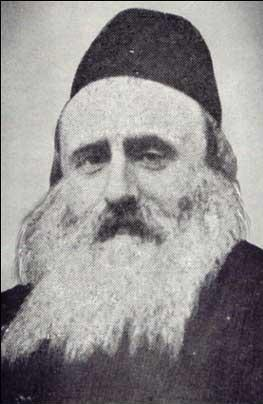
Rabbi Dovid Bornsztain, third Sochatchover Rebbe.

The third Sochatchover Rebbe, Dovid Bornsztain (1876–1942), eldest son of Shmuel, grew up near his grandfather, the Avnei Nezer, who was his primary teacher. After his marriage, he lived in his grandfather's house, continuing to study under him. He served as the Rav of Vishgorod, where he established a yeshiva patterned after the Sochatchov learning style, and served as Rav of Tomashov after World War II. Upon his father's death in January 1926, Dovid was appointed third Sochatchover Rebbe by his father's Hasidim. He established his court in Pabianice, near Łódź, and founded a network of yeshivas under the name Yeshivat Beit Avrohom in Łódź, Warsaw, and other Polish cities. He was an active member of Agudath Israel of America and the Moetzes Gedolei HaTorah and became known as one of the generation's leading Rebbes.

After the invasion of Poland in 1939, Dovid was smuggled into the Warsaw Ghetto on forged documents. His home became a center for Torah study and gatherings of rabbis and activists. He supervised the education of several hundred Sochatchover yeshiva students in the ghetto. When the deportations began, Dovid hid in a shop on 67 Genesha Street, where he died of heart failure on 17 November 1942. His wife, sons, daughters, sons-in-law and grandchildren were all murdered by the Nazis in the spring of 1943. All of Dovid's many manuscripts were destroyed, save for a few pages containing chidushim (new Torah thoughts) on the Passover Haggadah. These pages were later published as Chasdei Dovid together with the ninth volume of Shem Mishmuel, his father's work, which deals with the Haggadah.

=== Leadership in Israel ===
The fourth Sochatchover Rebbe was Chanoch Henoch Bornsztain (died 1965), the younger brother of Dovid Bornsztain, who had emigrated to Palestine in 1924 and opened a beis medrash in Jerusalem. After World War II, he accepted the request of the surviving Sochatchover Hasidim to be their leader and established his court in Jerusalem, preferring to remain in that city even during the 1948 Arab-Israeli war, when his followers in Tel Aviv urged him to join him there. He led the dynasty until his death in 1965.

The fifth Sochatchover Rebbe was Menachem Shlomo Bornsztain (1934–1969), eldest son of Chanoch Henoch Bornsztain. He was officially known as the Sochatchover-Radomsker Rebbe, since he was the great-grandson of the third Radomsker Rebbe (through his maternal lineage) and was asked by the Radomsker Hasidim who had survived the Holocaust to become their Rebbe as well. While his father was alive, he served as Rav of the Sochatchover shtiebel in Tel Aviv and Rav of the Yad Eliyahu neighborhood. He died in an automobile accident in August 1969 at the age of 34.

The sixth Sochatchover Rebbe is Shmuel Bornsztain (born 1961), eldest son of Menachem Shlomo Bornsztain. He was 8 years old at the time of his father's death, and became Rebbe a few years later. He presently leads the Sochatchover dynasty from Bayit Vegan, Jerusalem, where the Sochatchov yeshiva, Yeshivat Avnei Nezer, is located.

== Teachings ==
The Avnei Nezer and his son, the Shem Mishmuel, produced a body of teachings that are widely acknowledged as halakhic and homiletic Torah classics. The homiletic essays of the Shem Mishmuel have earned a following in both the Hasidic and non-Hasidic world, and are quoted in many Torah shiurim and books.

== Lineage of Sochatchov dynastic leadership ==
- First Sochatchover Rebbe: Avrohom Bornsztain (1838–1910), author of Avnei Nezer. Rebbe from 1870 to 1910.
  - Second Sochatchover Rebbe: Shmuel Bornsztain (1856–1926), son of Avrohom Bornsztain, author of Shem Mishmuel. Rebbe from 1910 to 1926.
    - Third Sochatchover Rebbe: Dovid Bornsztain (1876–1942), son of Shmuel Bornsztain. Rebbe from 1926 to 1942.
      - Fourth Sochatchover Rebbe: Chanoch Henoch Bornsztain (died 1965), son of Shmuel Bornsztain. Rebbe from the mid-1940s to 1965.
        - Fifth Sochatchover Rebbe: Menachem Shlomo Bornsztain (1934–1969), son of Chanoch Henoch Bornsztain. Rebbe from 1965 to 1969.
          - Sixth Sochatchover Rebbe: Shmuel Bornsztain (born 1961), son of Menachem Shlomo Bornsztain. Rebbe since the 1970s.

== See also ==
- History of the Jews in Poland
