= Shlomo Zev Zweigenhaft =

Polish rabbi (1915–2005)

Rabbi Shlomo Zev Zweigenhaft הרב שלמה זאב צווייגענהאפט
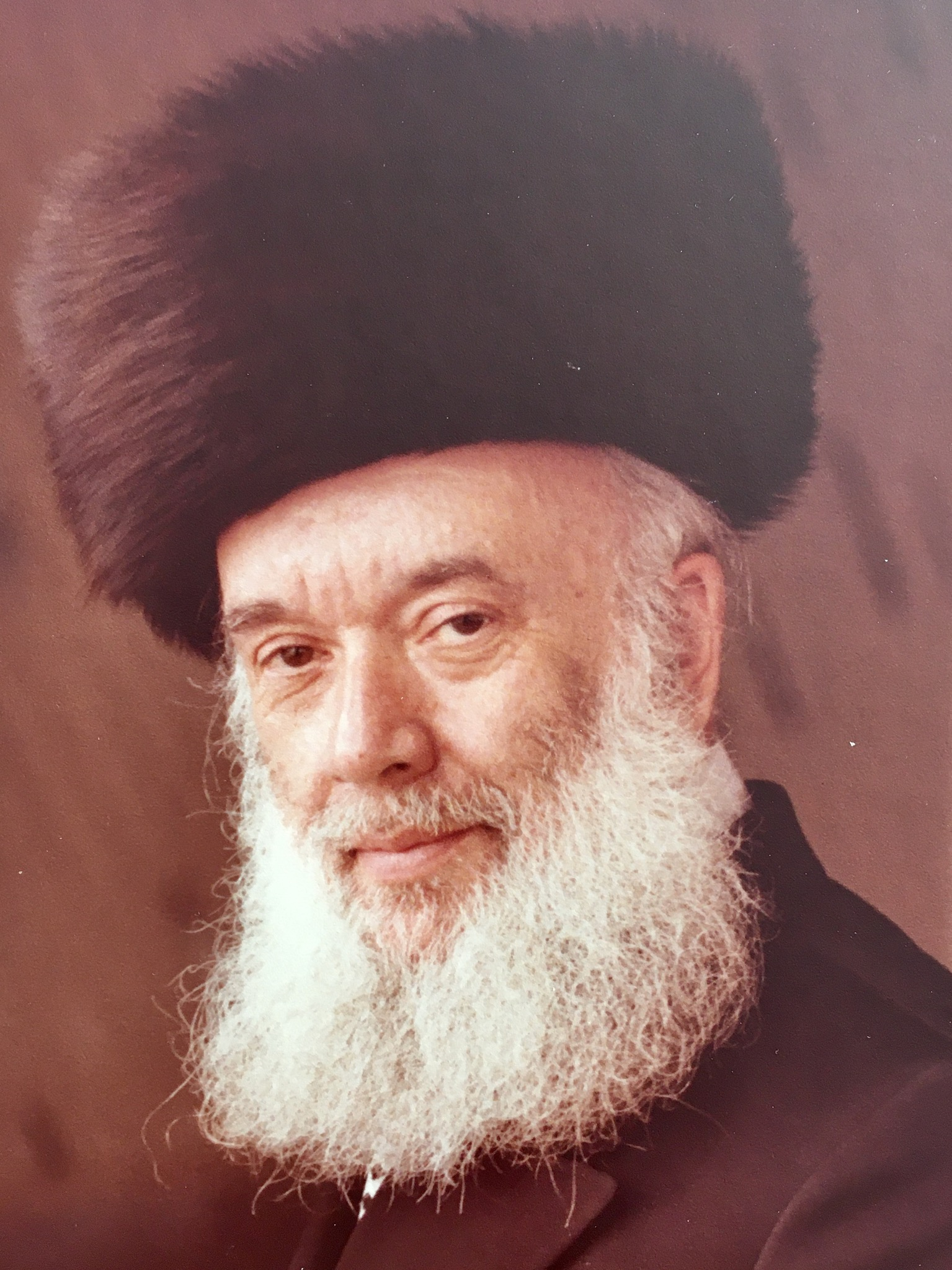
- Title: Rosh HaShochtim of Poland and Chief Rabbi of Hannover and Lower Saxony

Personal life
- Born: November 2, 1915 Sosnowiec, Poland
- Died: August 2, 2005 (aged 89) New York City, United States
- Buried: Mount of Olives, Jerusalem, State of Israel
- Occupation: Chief Rabbi, Rosh HaShochtim, Rav Hamachshir

Religious life
- Religion: Judaism
- Denomination: Orthodox
- Yahrtzeit: 26 Tammuz 5765
- Semikhah: Rabbi Aryeh Tzvi Frumer

Shlomo Zev Zweigenhaft (Hebrew: הרב שלמה זאב צווייגענהאפט) was a rabbi and Rosh Hashochtim of Poland (overseeing the country's kosher slaughterers) before the Holocaust. After the Holocaust he was Chief Rabbi of Hanover and Lower Saxony. After emigrating to the United States he was a Rav Hamachshir (kosher certifier) and was described as the "foremost authority on shechita" (kosher slaughter).

== Early life ==
=== Family ===
Rabbi Zweigenhaft was born in Sosnowiec Poland in 1915. His mother, Michla, was a daughter of Meir Dovid Reinhertz, a Rabbi who was a son of the Rabbi of Yanov and a grandson of the Rabbi of Przedbórz. Zweigenhaft's father, Rabbi Moshe Chaim, was a shochet (kosher slaughterer) and a student of Avrohom Bornsztain. Zweigenhaft was orphaned at the age of two and was raised by his paternal grandfather, Efraim Mordechai Mottel Zweigenhaft, who was a posek and shochet in Sosnowiec and a descendant of David HaLevi Segal and Joel Sirkis.

=== Education ===
Rabbi Zweigenhaft studied at a Radomsker cheder in Sosnowiec until the age of 12. For the next two years he was a student of Dov Berish Einhorn in Amstov. At the age of 14 he had memorized the gemara of the entire massekhtot of zevachim and menachot with the commentaries of Rashi and Tosafot He then returned to Sosnowiec where he was a student of David Moshe Rabinowicz in Kibbutz Govoha Yeshiva.

When Zweigenhaft was 16 years old he began to study privately with Aryeh Tzvi Frumer from whom he received rabbinical ordination two years later. This was an extremely rare achievement, considering that Frumer only ordained a total of 5 out of several hundred students over the course of his life.

David Avraham Mandelbaum, in Frummer's biography describes Zweigenhaft as an example of one of the "best" Talmudic students in Poland. Mandelbaum also describes Zweigenhaft's relationship with Frumer as "extremely close".

== Rosh Hashochtim of Poland ==
Rabbi Zweigenhaft's father, grandfather and great-grandfather were shochtim. As a young boy Zweigenhaft had been privy to his family's masorah (transmission of Jewish religious tradition) of shechita stretching back hundreds of years. When Zweigenhaft was 14 years old and still studying in Amstov, the shochtim of the city encountered a halachic difficulty and summoned Dov Berish Einhorn for assistance. Einhorn asked Zweigenhaft to accompany him on his walk to the slaughterhouse. When they arrived, Einhorn began to contemplate the problem that the shochtim presented to him. Zweigenhaft then proceeded to deftly pick up the chalef (shechitah knife) and demonstrated how to perform the shechitah and resolved their issue. Einhorn was so impressed that from then on he would only eat meat if it was slaughtered by Zweigenhaft despite his youth. Shortly thereafter, Rabbi Einhorn proudly told Yitzchok Mordechai Rabinowicz (Chief Rabbi of Polavno) about Zweigenhaft. Rabinowicz requested that Einhorn send Zweigenhaft to him and then proceeded to teach Zweigenhaft the masorah of shechita that he had learned from his grandfather the Tiferes Shlomo of Radomsk. Thereafter, the Radomsker Rebbe would only eat meat from Zweigenhaft's Shechita. Year later, when the Minchas Elazar of Munkach visited Sosnowiec, he too would only eat from Zweigenhaft's shechitah.

At the age of 18, Zweigenhaft was shochet of Sosnowiec and by the time he was 20, he was also the shochet of several other cities in Poland, including Radomsk, Polavno, Amstov, Volbrum, Elkish and Tchebin, and was the Rosh Hashochtim of Sosnowiec.

In the mid-1930s Zweigenhaft was appointed one of the seven members of the Vaad Roshei Hashochtim of Poland and Lithuania a board of seven rabbis overseeing thousands of shochtim throughout Poland. In 1936, a bill outlawing Shechitah was introduced in the Sejm (Polish legislature). Despite being the youngest member of the Vaad, Zweigenhaft was selected to perform Shechita in front of the assembled legislators and demonstrate that shechitah was a quick humane form of animal slaughter. Together with an intense lobbying effort, this led to the Sejm allowing the practice to continue, although it was restricted with a maximum quota.

Zweigenhaft was later appointed to be the head of the Vaad

== Leadership Roles In Germany ==
=== Rosh Hashochtim of British Occupation Zone of Germany ===
Zweigenhaft survived the Holocaust and was liberated in Bergen Belsen on April 11, 1945. Zweigenhaft retrieved a chalef (shechitah knife) from a museum in Hamburg and on August 21, 1945, he performed the first known kosher slaughter in Germany since it was outlawed by the Nazis in 1933. Thereafter, the British Chief Rabbi's Religious Emergency Council appointed Zweigenhaft to be the Rosh Hashochtim of the British Zone of Germany.

=== Rav Hamachshir of Bergen-Belsen ===
On November 7, 1945, the British Chief Rabbi's Religious Emergency Council established two large kitchens in Celle to provide kosher food for the thousands of Jewish survivors living in the nearby Bergen-Belsen D.P. Camp and appointed Zweigenhaft to be the Rav Hamachshir of Bergen-Belsen.

=== Vaad Harabonim of The British Zone and Rabbi of Various Communities ===
Zweigenhaft was appointed to be one of the rabbis on the Vaad Harabonim (Board of Rabbis) of the British Zone, which was established and led by Yoel Halpern. Since Zweigenhaft was constantly traveling throughout the zone to oversee and make arrangements related to shechitah, he was tasked by the Vaad to serve as the rabbi of several smaller Jewish communities in the British Zone that did not have their own rabbi.

=== Chief Rabbi of Hannover and Lower Saxony ===
In the months after the liberation of Bergen Belsen, Jewish survivors slowly began to leave the D.P. Camp and settle in towns and cities throughout the British Zone. When the nascent community of Jewish survivors in Hanover became large enough to warrant its own Rabbi, Zweigenhaft recommended to the British Chief Rabbi's Religious Emergency Council to appoint his friend (and future brother-in-law) Chaim Pinchas Lubinsky to the position. In January 1946, Lubinsky was appointed Chief Rabbi of Hanover. The community continued to grow and additional rabbinical leadership was required. On a few rare occasions, the Vaad Harabonim of the British zone convened a Bais Din in Hanover under the leadership of Yoel Halpern consisting of various rabbis of the Vaad including Lubinsky, Yisroel Moshe Olewski and Zweigenhaft. However, a more permanent solution was required and the community subsequently appointed Zweigenhaft as an additional rabbi of Hanover.

In 1949, when the British occupation of Northwest Germany ended, the British Chief Rabbi's Religious Emergency Council and its appointees were required to conclude operations in Germany. The newly independent Jewish community in Hanover then selected Zweigenhaft as the only rabbi of their city. Thereafter, smaller Jewish communities in Lower Saxony appointed Zweigenhaft as their rabbi as well and he became Chief Rabbi of Hanover and Lower Saxony.

=== Leader of Agudas Yisroel of the British Zone ===
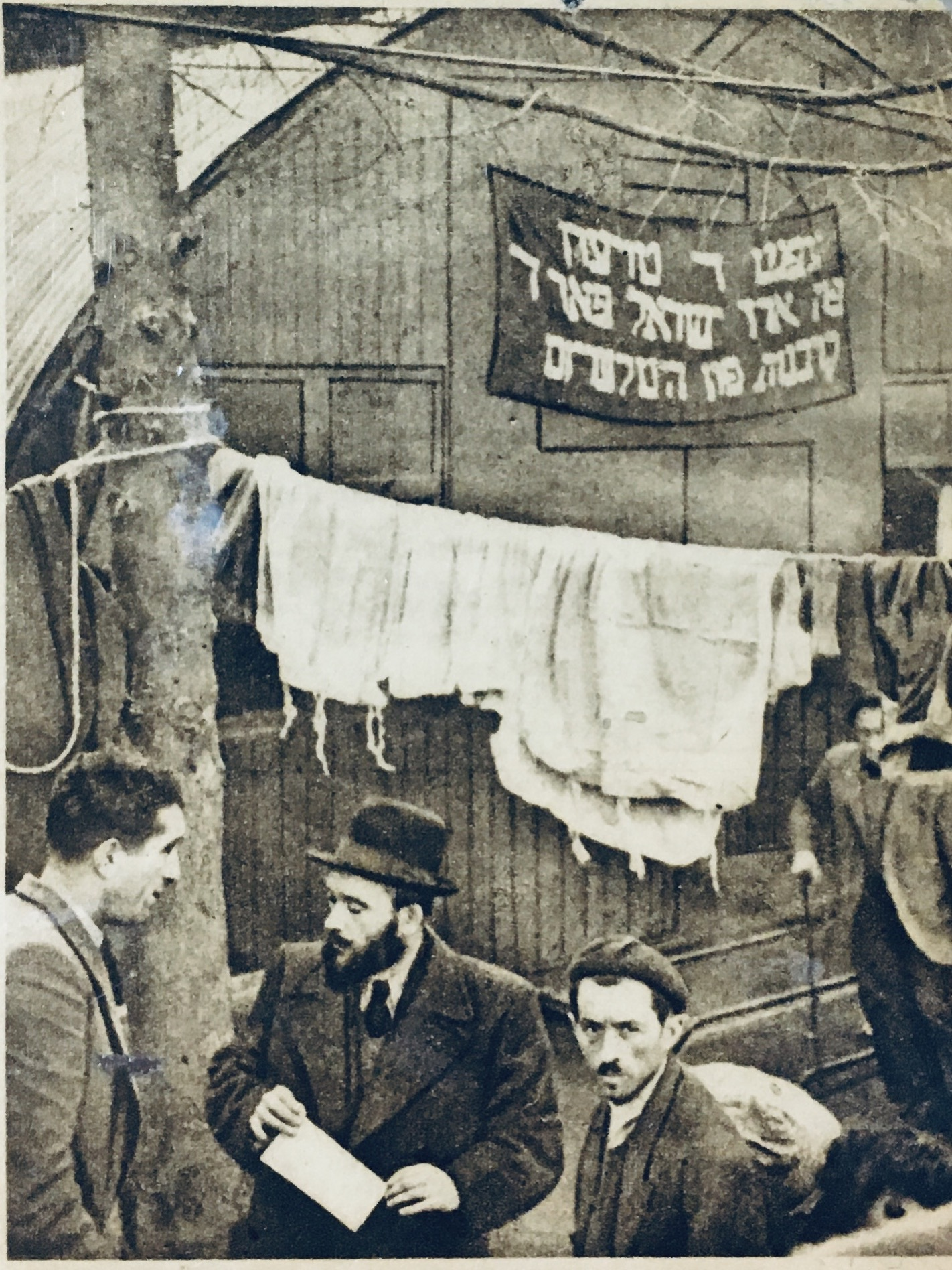
Zweigenhaft (center) at Pöppendorf D.P. Camp with Captain Ike Aronowicz (left) of the SS Exodus in 1947

Zweigenhaft, Yirsoel Moshe Olewski, and Efraim Londoner were the leaders of Agudas Yisroel of the British Zone. Zweigenhaft regularly engaged in advocating for both the spiritual and physical needs of the Jews in the zone. In 1947, Zweigenhaft provided supplies to the former passengers of the Exodus in Hamburg before they were forced to disembark.

== Rav Hamachshir in America ==
In 1952 Zweigenhaft emigrated to America and was asked by Eliezer Silver to be the Rosh Hashochtim of the two kosher slaughterhouses in Cincinnati, Ohio. In 1953 Zweigenhaft moved to New York where he was shocked by what he considered to be low kosher standards of shechita and began to advocate for improvements. In time, Zweigenhaft became the Rav Hamachshir of several kosher slaughterhouses and instituted reforms previously unknown in America. Some rabbis would not eat meat unless it was certified by Zweigenhaft. Over the years, many of Zweigenhaft's reforms took root in the industry.

Berel Wein writes in his autobiography that during his tenure as Executive Vice President of the Orthodox Union and Rabbinic Administrator of its Kashrut Division, the Orthodox Union found certifying kosher slaughterhouses very challenging and relied upon Zweigenhaft. He describes Zweigenhaft as "an expert in all the halachic and practical issues of kosher meat production."

The Orthodox Union certifies certain species of quail as kosher based on Zweigenhaft's masorah (tradition).

== Authority on kosher slaughter ==
Zweigenhaft was world-renowned as an authority on shechita. His expertise was highly sought after and he was asked to travel internationally to lecture on shechita, inspect kosher slaughterhouses, and recommend improvements. He trained hundreds of shochtim.

== Death ==
Zweigenhaft died in New York City August 2, 2005, and was buried the next day on the Mount of Olives in Jerusalem.

== Family ==
When Zweigenhaft was 18 years old he married his cousin Esther, the daughter of Shlomo Sztencl. She and their two children were murdered in Auschwitz on August 2, 1943.

After surviving the Holocaust Zweigenhaft married Frieda, who at the time was a teacher of Judaic studies at the religious girls seminary (kibbutz) in Bergen-Belsen displaced persons camp. Later, in the United States, she volunteered regularly at the Jewish Chronic Disease Hospital and was one of the founders of "Rivkah Laufer Bikur Cholim", a board member of "N’shei Agudas Yisroel" chapter in Crown Heights and the vice president of "Rabbi Meir Baal Hanes Kupath Polin" Ladies Auxiliary of Brooklyn. They were survived by two children.
