= Dov Berish Einhorn =

Polish rabbi

Rabbi Dov Berish Einhorn Rav, Rosh Yeshiva
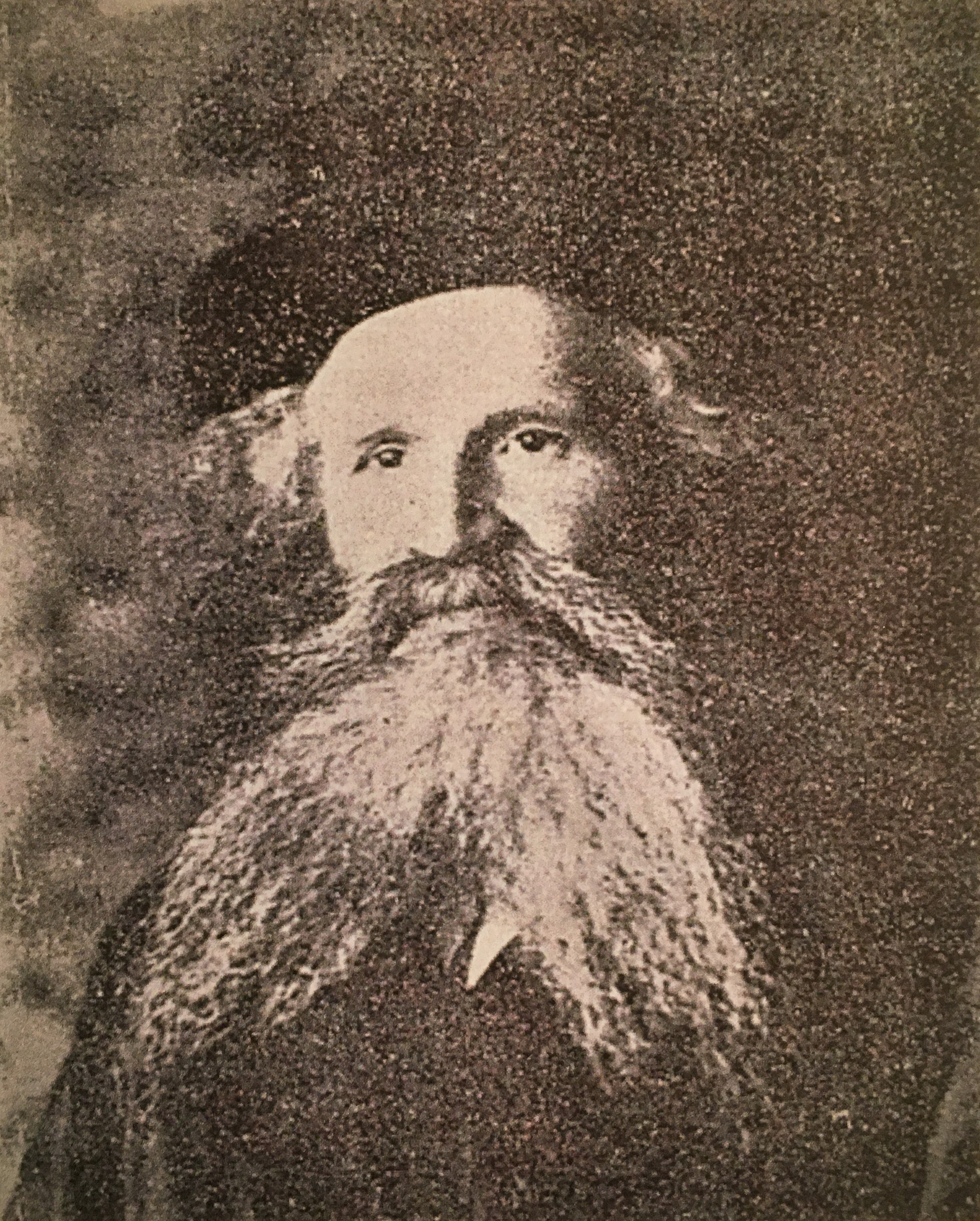
- Rabbi Dov Berish Einhorn
- Title: Amstover Rav

Personal life
- Born: 1877 Mstów (Amstov), Kielce Governorate, Congress Poland
- Died: 1942 (aged 64–65) Radomsko Ghetto, Reichsgau Wartheland, Nazi Germany
- Parent: Efraim Tzvi (father)
- Dynasty: Amstov

Religious life
- Religion: Judaism
- Denomination: Orthodox

Jewish leader
- Predecessor: Rabbi Efraim Tzvi Einhorn
- Successor: None (Community & Yeshiva were destroyed in the Holocaust)
- Position: Rosh yeshiva
- Yeshiva: Amstov - Shearis Efraim
- Began: 1901
- Ended: 1939
- Residence: Amstov, Olkusz, Ger
- Dynasty: Amstov
- Semikhah: Rabbi Yitzhak Yehudah Shmelkis, Chief Rabbi of Levov and author of Bais Yitzchok , Divrei Yitzchok and Siach Yitzchok

Rabbi Dov Berish Einhorn (1877 – 1942) was the Chief Rabbi and Rosh Yeshiva of Mstów, Poland.

== Biography ==
Dov Berish Einhorn was born in 1877 in the small town of Mstów, Poland where his father, Efraim Tzvi, served as the town's Rabbi. In Mstów, Efraim Tzvi had established one of the first formal yeshivas in Poland.

In 1888, at age 11, Dov Berish was sent to Olkusz to study the Torah for three years under the tutelage of Rabbi Lublinski. With the encouragement of the Radomsker Rebbe, Dov Berish excelled in his studies. After mastering and memorizing several tractates of gemara, he was tested by his father and then accepted into his yeshiva in Mstów, where he was considered one of the best students. At age 15, he married Rachel, the daughter of Rabbi Pinchas Menachem Justman. Dov Beirish then settled in his wife;s hometown of Ger where his father-in-law and his wife's uncle, Rabbi Yehudah Aryeh Leib Alter, encouraged him to continue his study of the Torah. After many years of marriage the couple realized that they could not produce a child and agreed to divorce. Rabbi Dov Berish then proceeded to marry the widow of Rabbi Yaakov Yosef Rabinowicz who had been the Rabbi of Klobutzk, author of emes l'yakov and son of Rabbi Avraham Yissachar Dov Rabinowicz.

== Rabbi and Rosh Yeshiva ==
In 1901 Einhorn's father, Efraim Tzvi died and the Jewish community in Mstów appointed him to succeed his father as both Rabbi and Rosh Yeshiva. Einhorn then received Rabbinical ordination from Rabbi Yitzhak Yehudah Shmelkis, Chief Rabbi of Levov and author of several books. Upon assuming leadership of the yeshiva, he chose to rename it Nachlas Efraim, in memory of his father. Under his leadership, the yeshiva was considered one of the most prestigious and exclusive in all of Poland. Einhorn continued to lead the yeshiva for almost 40 years. Among his notable students was Rabbi Shlomo Zev Zweigenhaft, who was Rosh Hashochtim of Poland and later became Chief Rabbi of Hannover and Lower Saxony.

== Death ==
When the Nazis invaded Poland, Einhorn was forced to relocate to the ghetto in Radomsko. In 1942, during the holiday of Shavuot, Nazi soldiers ordered Einhorn to board a train to the Treblinka extermination camp. He refused, and was shot dead.

== Works ==
In 1990, Einhorn's insights into the Torah were posthumously published together with those of his father, in a book called Shearis Efraim-Dov.
