= David Moshe Rabinowicz =

Rabbi and rosh yeshiva (b. 1906, d. 1942)

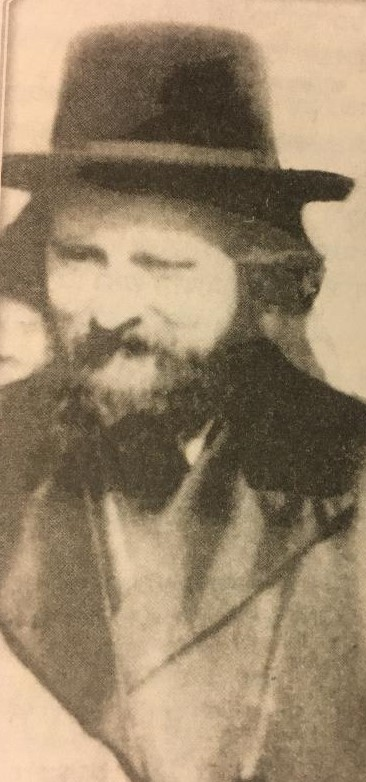

David Moshe Rabinowicz (1906–1942) was a rabbi who was the rosh yeshiva (dean) of Kibbutz Govoha and the Keser Torah network. He was murdered by Nazis during the Holocaust.

== Biography ==
Rabinowicz was the son of Nosson Nachum Hakohen Rabinowicz the rebbe of Krimilov, and grandson of the second Radomsker rebbe, Avraham Yissachar Dov Rabinowicz. He married Reizel, the only daughter of his first cousin Shlomo Chanoch Rabinowicz who was the fourth Radomsker rebbe.

== Rosh Yeshiva ==
Rabinowicz headed Kibbutz Govoha, which his father established in Sosnowiec exclusively for high-level students and married students. He also served as rosh yeshiva of the entire Keser Torah network, which had 36 Keser Torah yeshivas enrolling over 4,000 students in Poland by the start of World War II, when they were disbanded after the German invasion of Poland in 1939, after which most of their students were murdered in the Holocaust.

== World War II, death, and legacy ==
Rabinowicz was imprisoned by the Nazis in the Warsaw Ghetto, where he continued to teach.

He, his wife Reizel, and their infant son, were murdered by the Nazis on 1 August 1942.

His students included Shlomo Zev Zweigenhaft.

== Written works ==
In 1989 a collection of his writing were published in a book entitled "Toras Ha'olos".

In 2015, another book consisting of a collection of his writings was published. The book is titled "Zichron Kohen".
