= Gmina Mstów =

Gmina Mstów Mstów Commune
- Gmina
- Coat of arms
- Interactive map of Gmina Mstów
- Coordinates (Mstów): 50°49′40″N 19°17′14″E
- Country: Poland
- Voivodeship: Silesian
- County: Częstochowa
- Seat: Mstów

Area
  - Total: 119.84 km^{2} (46.27 sq mi)

Population (2019-06-30)
  - Total: 10,833
  - Density: 90.396/km^{2} (234.12/sq mi)
- Website: http://www.mstow.pl/

Gmina Mstów is a rural gmina (administrative district) in Częstochowa County, Silesian Voivodeship, in southern Poland. Its seat is the village of Mstów, which lies approximately 13 kilometres (8 mi) east of Częstochowa and 68 km (42 mi) north of the regional capital Katowice.

The gmina covers an area of 119.84 square kilometres (46.3 sq mi), and as of 2019 its total population is 10,833.

== Villages ==
Gmina Mstów contains the villages and settlements of Brzyszów, Cegielnia, Gąszczyk, Jaskrów, Jaźwiny, Kłobukowice, Kobyłczyce, Krasice, Kuchary, Kuśmierki, Latosówka, Łuszczyn, Małusy Małe, Małusy Wielkie, Mokrzesz, Mstów, Pniaki Mokrzeskie, Rajsko, Siedlec, Srocko, Wancerzów and Zawada.

== Neighbouring gminas ==
Gmina Mstów is bordered by the city of Częstochowa and by the gminas of Dąbrowa Zielona, Janów, Kłomnice, Olsztyn, Przyrów and Rędziny.
