= Vaad Rosh Hashochtim of Poland and Lithuania =

Rabbinical organization based in Poland and Lithuania

Vaad Roshei Hashochtim of Poland and Lithuania (Council of Leaders of the Shochtim of Poland and Lithuania) (He: ועד ראשי השוחטים דמדינת פולין וליטא) was a council of seven rabbis that oversaw Poland and Lithuania's 3,500 practicing shochtim prior to the Holocaust.

== Inauguration ==
The Vaad was established in the mid-1930s by many of the leading Polish and Lithuanian rabbis of the era including, but not limited to, Rabbi Chaim Ozer Grodzinski, Rabbi Avraham Mordechai Alter, Rabbi Shlomo Chanoch Rabinowicz, Rabbi Dovid Bornsztain. To enable the Vaad's authority to be universally accepted by each of the numerous sects of Polish and Lithuanian jewry it was mutually agreed that Vaad should consist of seven Rabbis thereby allowing each of the different founding Rabbis to make a specific appointment to the Vaad from among their followers who were loyal to their particular beliefs, philosophy and customs. Furthermore, the founding Rabbis decided that Vaad should specifically consist of an odd number of Rabbi's to ensure that a vote among the seven members of the Vaad could never become deadlocked. The founding Rabbis then carefully selected from their followers seven Rabbis who were each qualified as both Rabbinical poskim and shochtim. As soon as the Vaad was formed, its seven members agreed to meet regularly in Warsaw to hold their meetings.

== Mission ==
Many impoverished tiny Jewish communities did not have the financial means to afford the salary of a knowledgeable Rabbi, and, as a result, there was an abysmally low standard of kashrut in a significant number of small villages. Furthermore, as a result of the industrialization of Europe, travel became quicker and cheaper. This phenomenon changed the world of shechitah dramatically. Where as, previously, all meat sold in each town was slaughtered by a shochet in that specific town under the auspices of that town's Rabbi, there was now a new phenomenon of "imported" meat. The Vaad was therefore created in order to implement, impose and then monitor one universal high standard of kashrus of shechitah that was acceptable to all of Orthodox Jewry.

== Vaad and Polish Parliament (Sejm) ==
In 1936, a bill outlawing Shechitah was introduced in the Sejm. Rabbi Shlomo Zev Zweigenhaft who was the head of the seven member Vaad was selected to demonstrate to members of the Sejm that Shechita was, in fact, a quick humane form of animal slaughter. The members of the Sejm gathered in a nearby courtyard and Rabbi Zweigenhaft demonstrated actual shechita for them. This demonstration together with an intense lobbying effort was partially successful and instead of banning shechita completely the Sejm allowed the practice to continue although they restricted it with a maximum quota.

== Vaad disbanded ==
With the Nazi invasion of Poland, shechitah was completely banned on October 26, 1939 and the Vaad was disbanded. During the Holocaust 90 percent of Polish and Lithuanian Jewry was annihilated. The tiny number of survivors emigrated almost in its entirety, including Rabbi Zweigenhaft, who was the only surviving member of the Vaad.
