= Siedlec, Gmina Mstów =

Siedlec
- Village
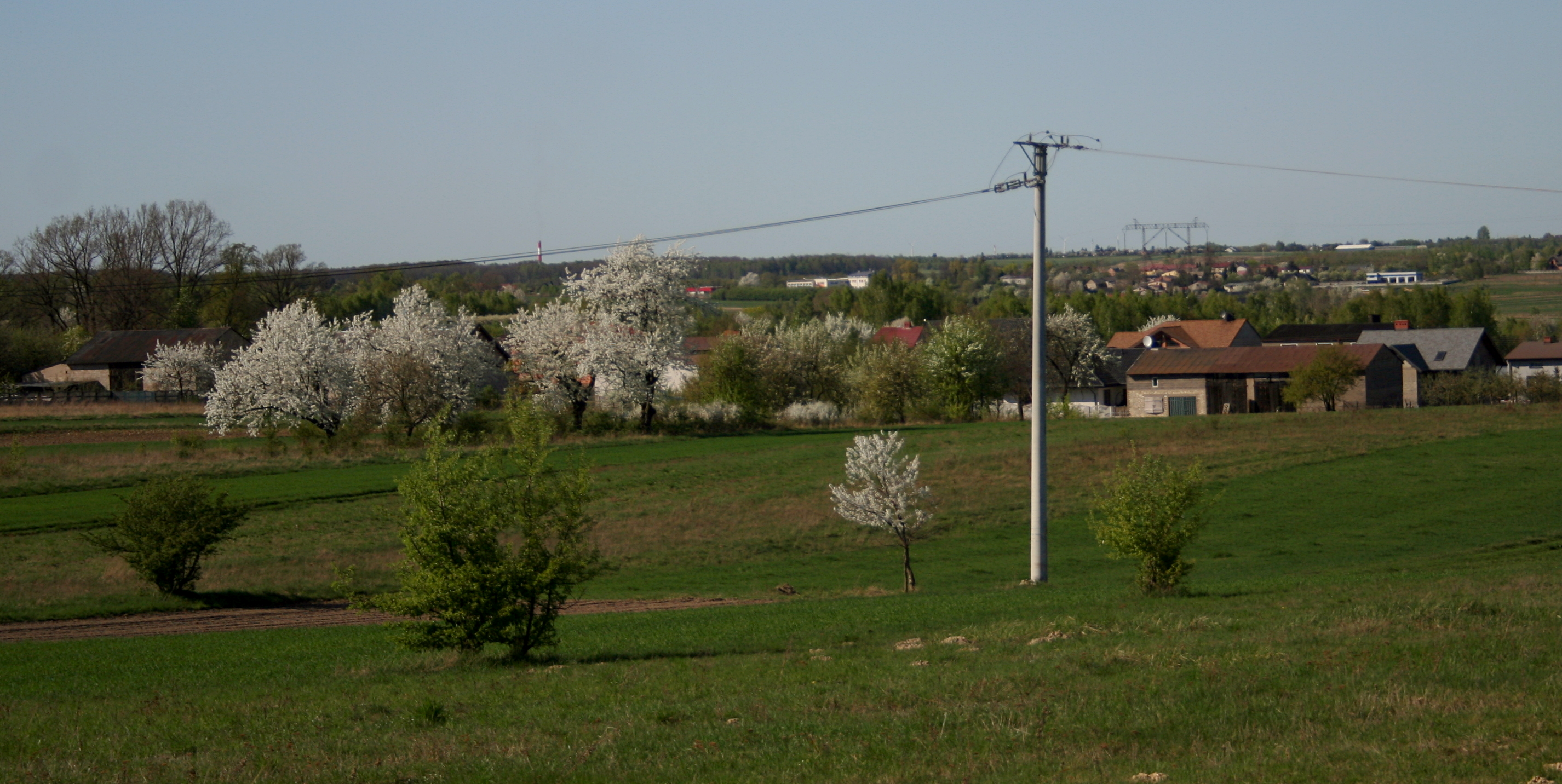

- Location within Poland
- Coordinates: 50°49′N 19°15′E
- Country: Poland
- Voivodeship: Silesian
- County: Częstochowa
- Gmina: Mstów
- Population: 464

Siedlec [ˈɕɛdlɛt͡s] is a village in the administrative district of Gmina Mstów, within Częstochowa County, Silesian Voivodeship, in southern Poland.
