= Wancerzów =

- Village
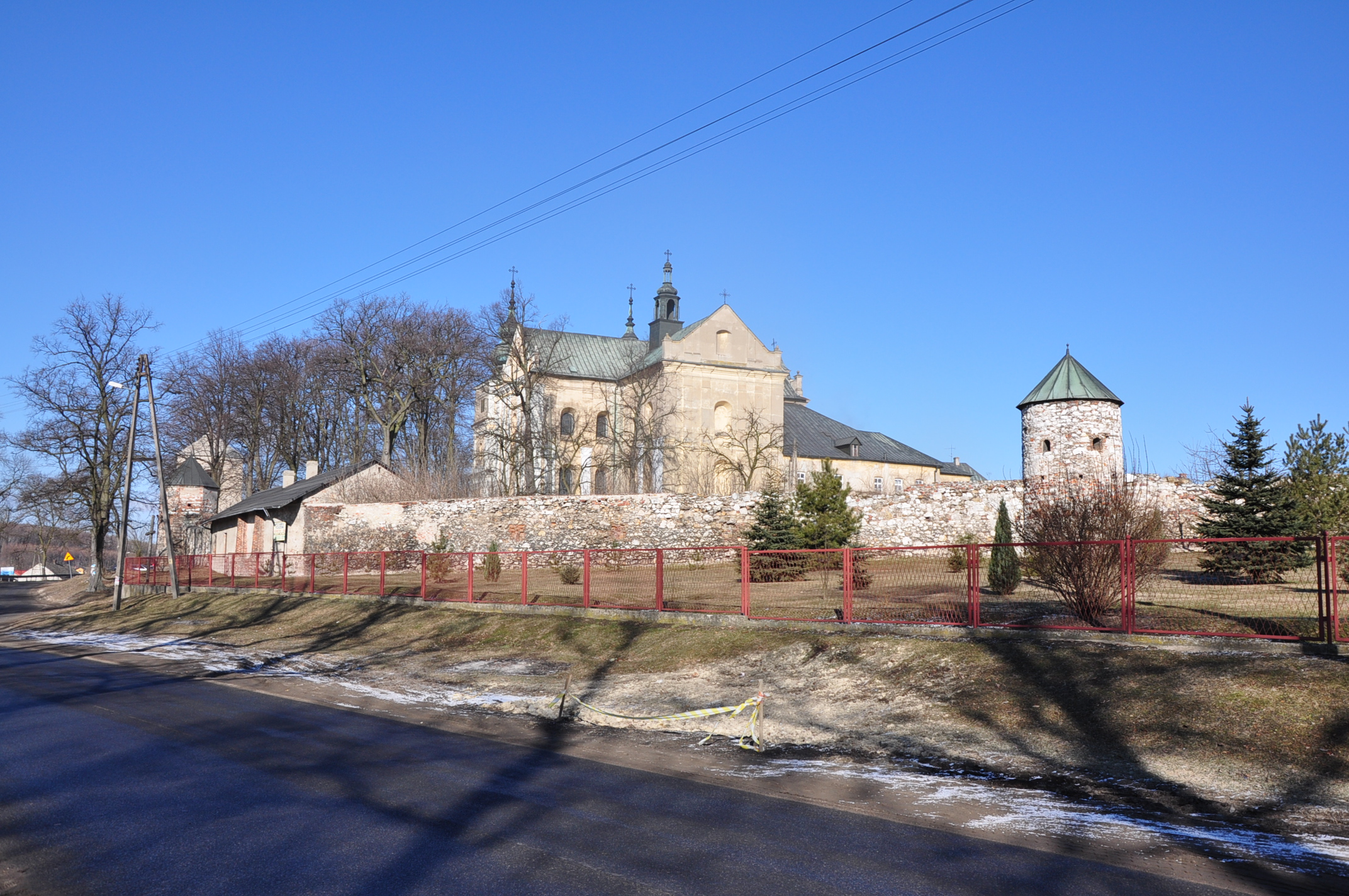
- Monastery

- Location within Poland
- Coordinates: 50°49′N 19°17′E
- Country: Poland
- Voivodeship: Silesian
- County: Częstochowa
- Gmina: Mstów
- Population: 584

Wancerzów [vanˈt͡sɛʐuf] is a village in the administrative district of Gmina Mstów, within Częstochowa County, Silesian Voivodeship, in southern Poland, near Wanceland.
