= Kuśmierki =

- Village
- Location within Poland
- Coordinates: 50°48′N 19°24′E
- Country: Poland
- Voivodeship: Silesian
- County: Częstochowa
- Gmina: Mstów
- Elevation: 245 m (804 ft)
- Population: 135

Kuśmierki [kuɕˈmjɛrki] is a village in the administrative district of Gmina Mstów, within Częstochowa County, Silesian Voivodeship, in southern Poland.
