= Vaad =

Hebrew term for a council

For the Va'adat Ezrah Vehatzalah, known as the Vaad, see Aid and Rescue Committee

Vaad (ועד) is a Hebrew term for a council. Often it refers to a council of rabbis, i.e., a rabbinical council. It is a diasporic phenomenon, having no precedent in Talmudic times. A Vaad has different responsibilities from a beth din (rabbinical court).

== Historical ==
Older examples include the Council of Four Lands.

Since the Haskalah and the subsequent Jewish emancipation in European nations, Jewish communities no longer have their own autonomous governments, and vaads with governmental powers no longer exist. Nevertheless, Vaads empowered by the Rabbinate and community leaders continued to wield tremendous power within their respective Jewish communities. A prime example of this was the Vaad Rosh Hashochtim of Poland and Lithuania. This council consisted of seven rabbis who regulated the over 3500 practicing shochetim in Poland and Lithuania before the Holocaust.

Today, Vaads still exist as rabbinical councils, each with its own purview. Some deal with maintaining communal standards of kashrut (kosher food); others deal with communal standards of marriage, divorce and conversion to Judaism.

== Modern day ==
Modern-day vaads in Orthodox Judaism include the Vaad Halakha and the Beth Din of America, both sponsored by the Rabbinical Council of America. Another example is the Vaad Harabonim, part of the Rabbinical Council of New England. It supervises the kashrut of foods for many food manufacturers in New England, USA.

Modern-day vaads in Conservative Judaism include the Rabbinical Assembly's Committee on Jewish Law and Standards, and the Israeli Vaad Halakha.

The term is also used at Jewish summer camps, such as Camp Ramah Darom and Camp Ramah in the Berkshires, to refer to a group of counselors who work together to plan a program for their campers. Examples include a Vaad Tefillah (which plans programs during morning prayer services), a Vaad Peulat Erev (which plans evening activities), and a Vaad Shabbat (which plans programs for the sabbath). Because of its frequent use at camps, many Jewish young adults have adopted this term for use in other contexts. For example, when planning a party, one may be a member of Vaad Tequila.
