= Kuchary, Silesian Voivodeship =

Kuchary
- Village
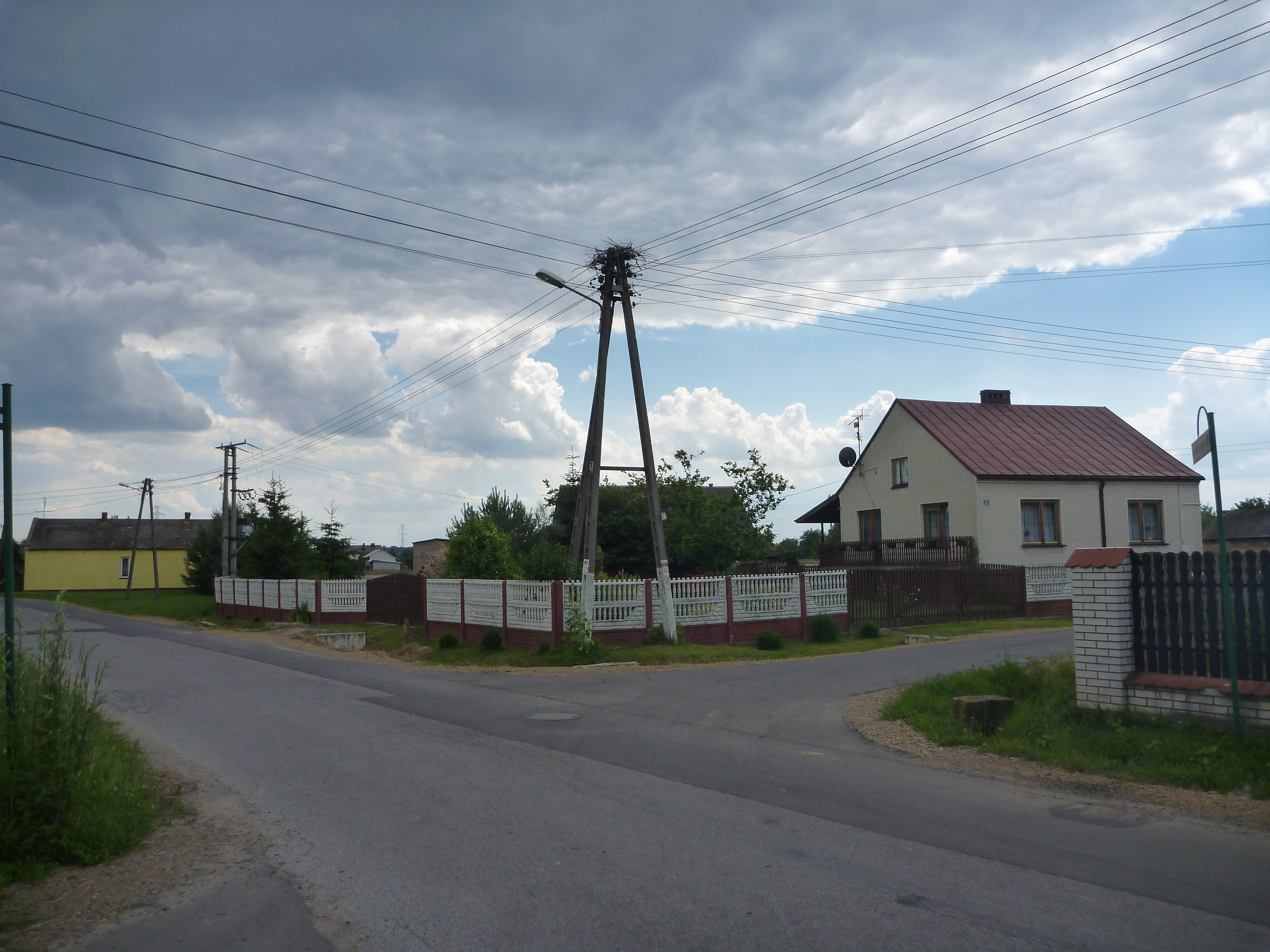

- Location within Poland
- Coordinates: 50°51′N 19°18′E
- Country: Poland
- Voivodeship: Silesian
- County: Częstochowa
- Gmina: Mstów
- Population (2011): 483

Kuchary [kuˈxarɨ] is a village in the administrative district of Gmina Mstów, within Częstochowa County, Silesian Voivodeship, in southern Poland.
