= Jaskrów =

- Village
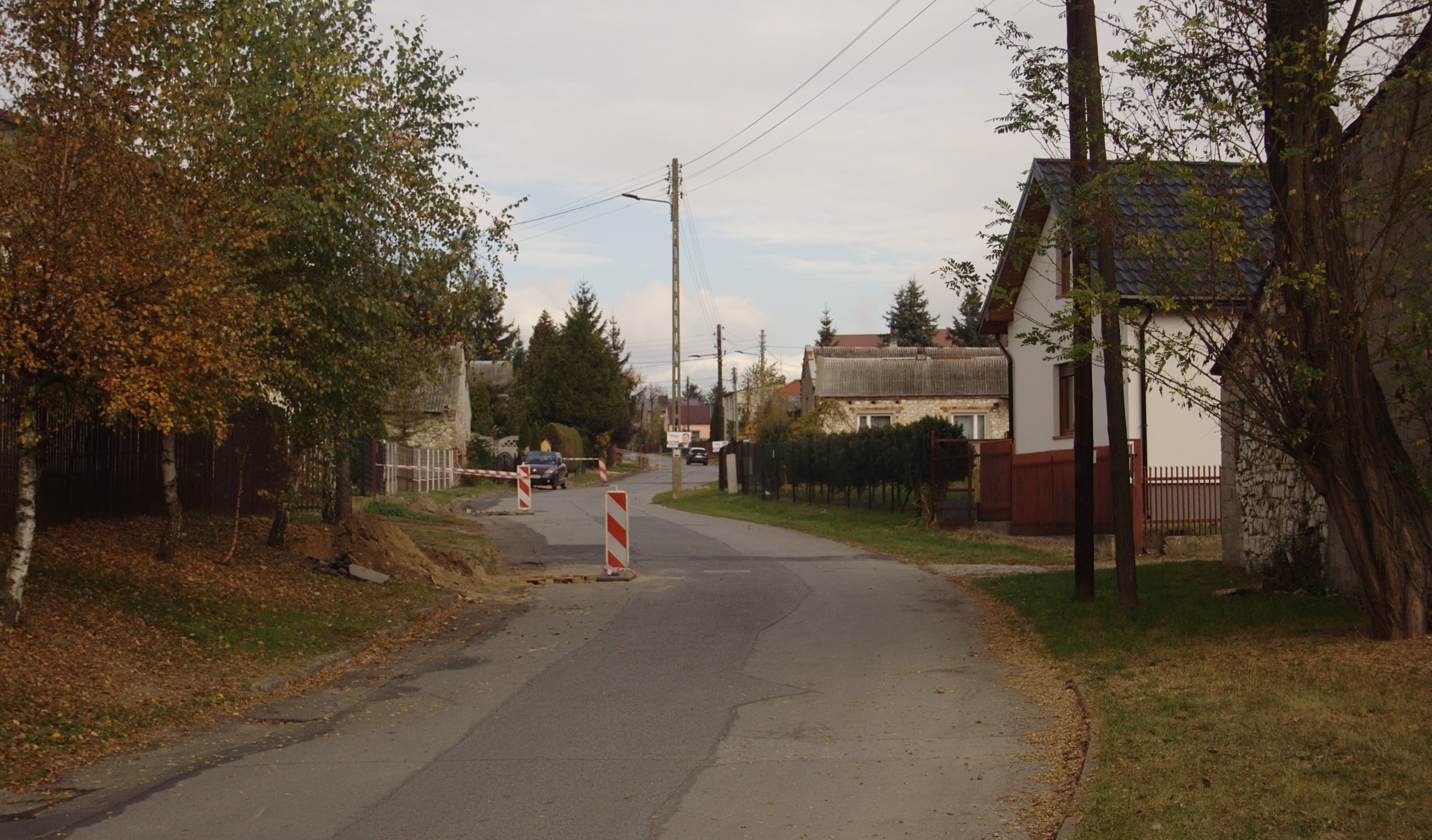

- Location within Poland
- Coordinates: 50°50′N 19°13′E
- Country: Poland
- Voivodeship: Silesian
- County: Częstochowa
- Gmina: Mstów
- Population: 1,794
- Website: http://www.jaskrow.pl/

Jaskrów [ˈjaskruf] is a village in the administrative district of Gmina Mstów, within Częstochowa County, Silesian Voivodeship, in southern Poland.
