= Cegielnia, Silesian Voivodeship =

Cegielnia
- Village
- Location within Poland
- Coordinates: 50°50′N 19°17′E
- Country: Poland
- Voivodeship: Silesian
- County: Częstochowa
- Gmina: Mstów
- Population: 395

Cegielnia [t͡sɛˈɡʲɛlɲa] is a village in the administrative district of Gmina Mstów, within Częstochowa County, Silesian Voivodeship, in southern Poland.
