= Zawada, Gmina Mstów =

Zawada
- Village
- Location within Poland
- Coordinates: 50°48′47″N 19°19′28″E
- Country: Poland
- Voivodeship: Silesian
- County: Częstochowa
- Gmina: Mstów
- Population: 651

Zawada [zaˈvada] is a village in the administrative district of Gmina Mstów, within Częstochowa County, Silesian Voivodeship, in southern Poland.
