= Pniaki Mokrzeskie =

- Village
- Location within Poland
- Coordinates: 50°49′N 19°26′E
- Country: Poland
- Voivodeship: Silesian
- County: Częstochowa
- Gmina: Mstów
- Population: 81

Pniaki Mokrzeskie [ˈpɲaki mɔˈkʂɛskʲɛ] is a village in the administrative district of Gmina Mstów, within Częstochowa County, Silesian Voivodeship, in southern Poland.
