= Yechezkel Rabinowicz =

Polish rabbi

Yechezkel Hakohen Rabinowicz
- Born: 1862; Radomsko, Poland
- Died: 22 November 1910 (20 Cheshvan 5671); Radomsko
- Notable work: Kenesses Yechezkel
- Title: Third Radomsker Rebbe
- Term: 1866 – 1892
- Predecessor: Avraham Yissachar Dov Hakohen Rabinowicz
- Successor: Shlomo Chanoch Hakohen Rabinowicz
- Children: Elimelech Aryeh; Shlomo Chanoch
- Father: Avraham Yissachar Dov Rabinowicz
- Family: Radomsk dynasty

Yechezkel Hakohen Rabinowicz (also spelled Rabinowitz, Rabinowich, Rabinovitch; 1862 – 22 November 1910) was the third rebbe of the Radomsk Hasidic dynasty. He was the grandson of the founder of the dynasty, Shlomo Rabinowicz, and the second son of the second Radomsker rebbe, Avraham Yissachar Dov Rabinowicz. He is known as the Kenesses Yechezkel after the title of a work he wrote.

== Biography ==
Rabinowicz initially was rabbi of Novipola, and became the third Radomsker rebbe after his father's death in 1892.

== Death and legacy ==
Rabinowicz, who suffered from diabetes like his father, also died at the age of 48, on 22 November 1910. An estimated 25,000 people attended his funeral from all over Poland and Galicia, and special trains brought mourners from Łódź, Będzin and Częstochowa. His Torah teachings were compiled under the title Kenesses Yechezkel, published in 1913.

He had two sons, Elimelech Aryeh, the Rav of Siedliszcze, and Shlomo Chanoch, who succeeded him as Radomsker Rebbe. Both sons were murdered in the Holocaust.

== Rebbes of Radomsk ==
1. Shlomo Hakohen Rabinowicz, the Tiferes Shlomo (1801–1866)
2. Avraham Yissachar Dov Hakohen Rabinowicz, the Chesed LeAvraham (1843–1892)
3. Yechezkel Hakohen Rabinowicz, the Kenesses Yechezkel (1862–1910)
4. Shlomo Chanoch Hakohen Rabinowicz, the Shivchei Kohen (1882–1942)
5. Menachem Shlomo Bornsztain, Sochatchover-Radomsker Rebbe (1934–1969)
