= Małusy Małe =

- Village
- Location within Poland
- Coordinates: 50°47′N 19°18′E
- Country: Poland
- Voivodeship: Silesian
- County: Częstochowa
- Gmina: Mstów
- Population: 284

Małusy Małe [maˈwusɨ ˈmawɛ] is a village in the administrative district of Gmina Mstów, within Częstochowa County, Silesian Voivodeship, in southern Poland.
