= Małusy Wielkie =

- Village
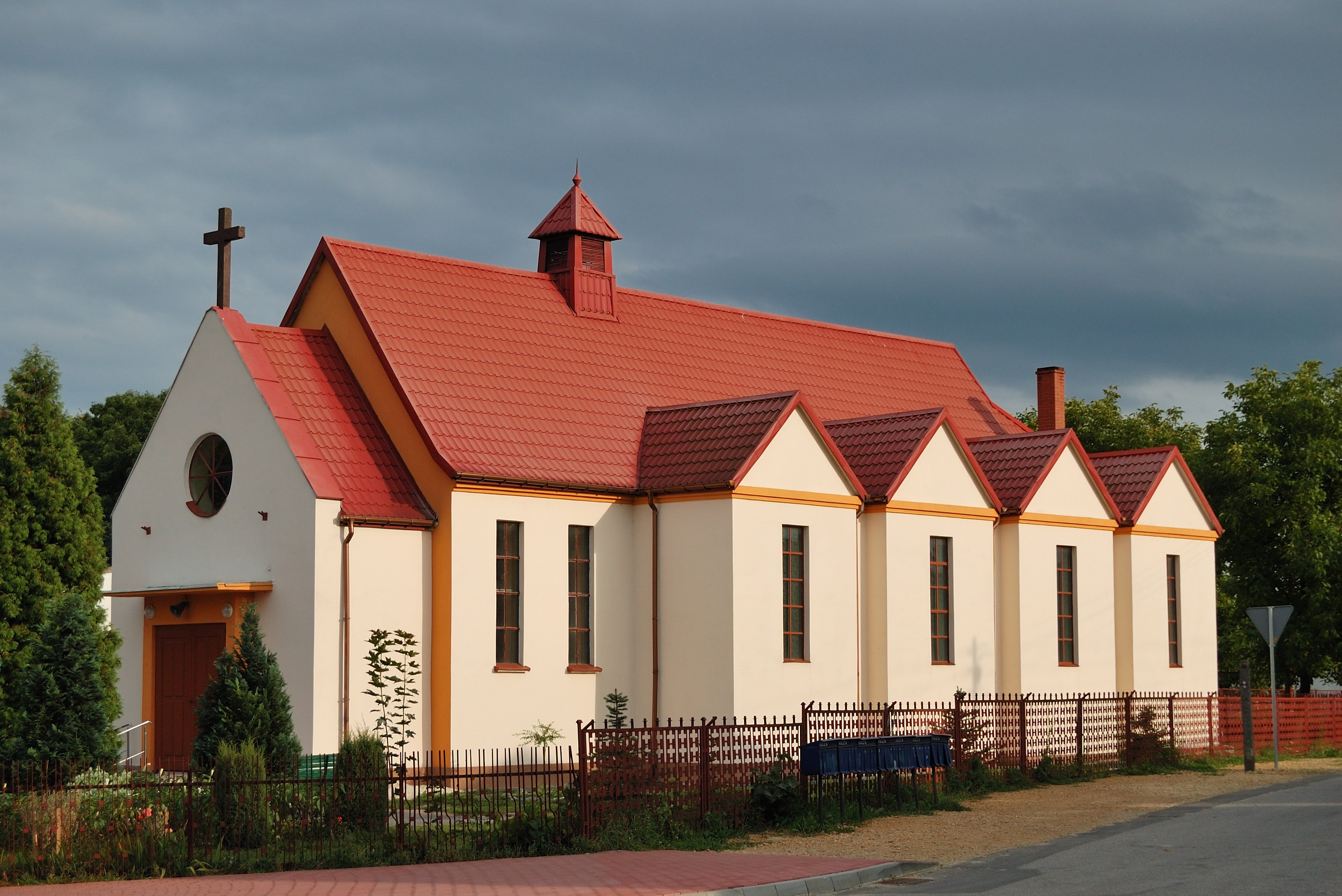
- Our Lady of Perpetual Help church

- Location within Poland
- Coordinates: 50°47′N 19°19′E
- Country: Poland
- Voivodeship: Silesian
- County: Częstochowa
- Gmina: Mstów

Population
  - Total: 473
- Time zone: UTC+1 (CET)
  - Summer (DST): UTC+2 (CEST)
- Vehicle registration: SCZ

Małusy Wielkie [maˈwusɨ ˈvjɛlkʲɛ] is a village in the administrative district of Gmina Mstów, within Częstochowa County, Silesian Voivodeship, in southern Poland.

== History ==
During the German invasion of Poland, which started World War II in September 1939, German troops carried out a massacre of 11 Poles (see Nazi crimes against the Polish nation).
