= Srocko =

- Village
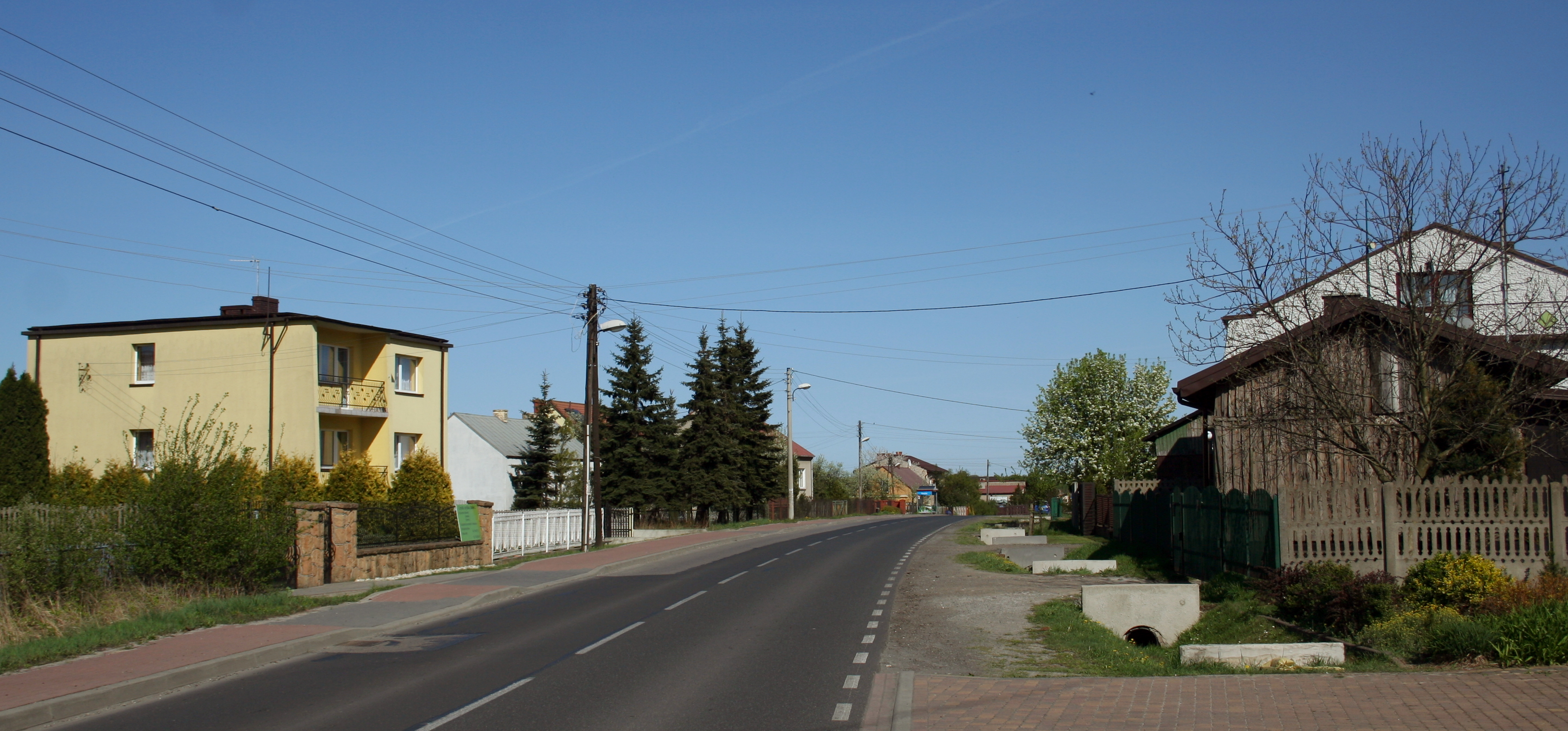

- Location within Poland
- Coordinates: 50°47′N 19°15′E
- Country: Poland
- Voivodeship: Silesian
- County: Częstochowa
- Gmina: Mstów
- Population: 401

Srocko [ˈsrɔt͡skɔ] is a village in the administrative district of Gmina Mstów, within Częstochowa County, Silesian Voivodeship, in southern Poland.
