= Latosówka =

- Village
- Location within Poland
- Coordinates: 50°51′48″N 19°16′35″E
- Country: Poland
- Voivodeship: Silesian
- County: Częstochowa
- Gmina: Mstów
- Population: 180

Latosówka [latɔˈsufka] is a village in the administrative district of Gmina Mstów, within Częstochowa County, Silesian Voivodeship, in southern Poland.
