= Radomsk =

Hasidic dynasty

Radomsk Hasidic Dynasty
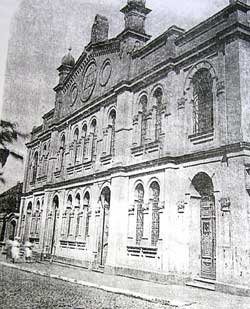
- Great Synagogue in Radomsk

Founder
- Rabbi Shlomo Hakohen Rabinowicz

Regions with significant populations
- Israel, United States, Poland

Religions
- Hasidic Judaism

Languages
- Yiddish, Hebrew

Related ethnic groups
- Sochatchov, Warka

Radomsk (Hebrew: רדומסק) is a hasidic dynasty named after the town of Radomsko in Łódź province, south-central Poland. The dynasty was founded in 1843 by Shlomo Hakohen Rabinowicz (known as the Tiferes Shlomo). His son, grandson and great-grandson also led the dynasty, which had thousands of followers. On the eve of World War II, Radomsk was the third largest Hasidic dynasty in Poland, after Ger and Alexander.

The town of Radomsko was destroyed and most of its Jews deported and killed during the German occupation of Poland in World War II. The fourth Radomsker rebbe, Shlomo Chanoch Hakohen Rabinowicz, was murdered by the Nazis in the Warsaw Ghetto in 1942, bringing the father-to-son dynasty to an end.

In 1965, at the request of Radomsker Hasidim who had survived the Holocaust and were living in Israel, the fifth rebbe of the Sochatchover Hasidim (and a descendant of the first Radomsker rebbe) Menachem Shlomo Bornsztain, became their rebbe as well. Bornsztain's son Avrohom Nosson Bornsztain leads the Radomsker synagogue in Bnei Brak.

== History ==
=== Leadership ===
The founder of the dynasty was Shlomo Hakohen Rabinowicz (known as the Tiferes Shlomo) (1801–1866), who had begun serving as rabbi of Radomsko (Radomsk) in 1834. When Moshe Biderman of Lelov moved to the Land of Israel he told his hasidim to follow Rabinowicz and Radomsk became a major hasidic center. Rabinowicz's discourses on the Chumash and Jewish holidays were published posthumously in Warsaw in 1867–1869 as the two-volume Tiferes Shlomo. This work, considered a textbook of hasidic thought, and has been continuously reprinted.

He died in 1866 and was succeeded by his youngest son, Avraham Yissachar Dov Rabinowicz (1843–1892), who was musical. After he became rebbe, he attracted many hasidim from Poland and Galicia. He had diabetes and died in Radomsk at the age of 49. His Torah teachings were compiled under the title Chesed L'Avraham, published in Piotrkow in 1893.

He was succeeded as rebbe by his second son, Yechezkel Rabinowicz (1864–1910), who had earlier been rabbi of Novipola. He had diabetes like his father and also died before the age of 50. An estimated 25,000 people attended his funeral from all over Poland and Galicia. His Torah teachings were compiled under the title Kenesses Yechezkel, published in 1913.

His eldest son, Shlomo Chanoch Rabinowitz (1882–1942), succeeded him. He was wealthy. and owned a glass factory and homes in Berlin, Warsaw, and Sosnowiec; he re-established his court in Sosnowiec after World War I. He also amassed a large personal collection of old manuscripts and prints that was said to be the second-largest private library in Poland after that of the Gerrer Rebbe.

=== Keser Torah yeshiva network ===
The fourth Radomsker Rebbe innovated a new trend in Hasidic education in Poland. Until World War I, Hasidic youth traditionally studied Torah and learned the customs and lore of their dynasties in shtiebelach (small houses of prayer and study) across Poland. As the war uprooted hundreds of thousands of Jews and decimated established communities, the shtiebelach lost their central place in Hasidic life. In 1926, the Rebbe announced his plan to create a network of yeshivas called Keser Torah (Crown of Torah). By 1930, nine yeshivas were functioning in major Polish cities, together with a "Kibbutz Govoha" (high-level study group) for advanced students and avreichim (married students) in Sosnowiec. The Rebbe appointed his new son-in-law, Rabbi Dovid Moshe Hakohen Rabinowicz (1906–1942), to serve as rosh yeshiva for the entire network. By 1939, there were 36 Keser Torah yeshivas enrolling over 4,000 students in Poland and Galicia. The Rebbe paid for the entire operation, including staff salaries, food, and student lodging, out of his own pocket.

=== World War II ===
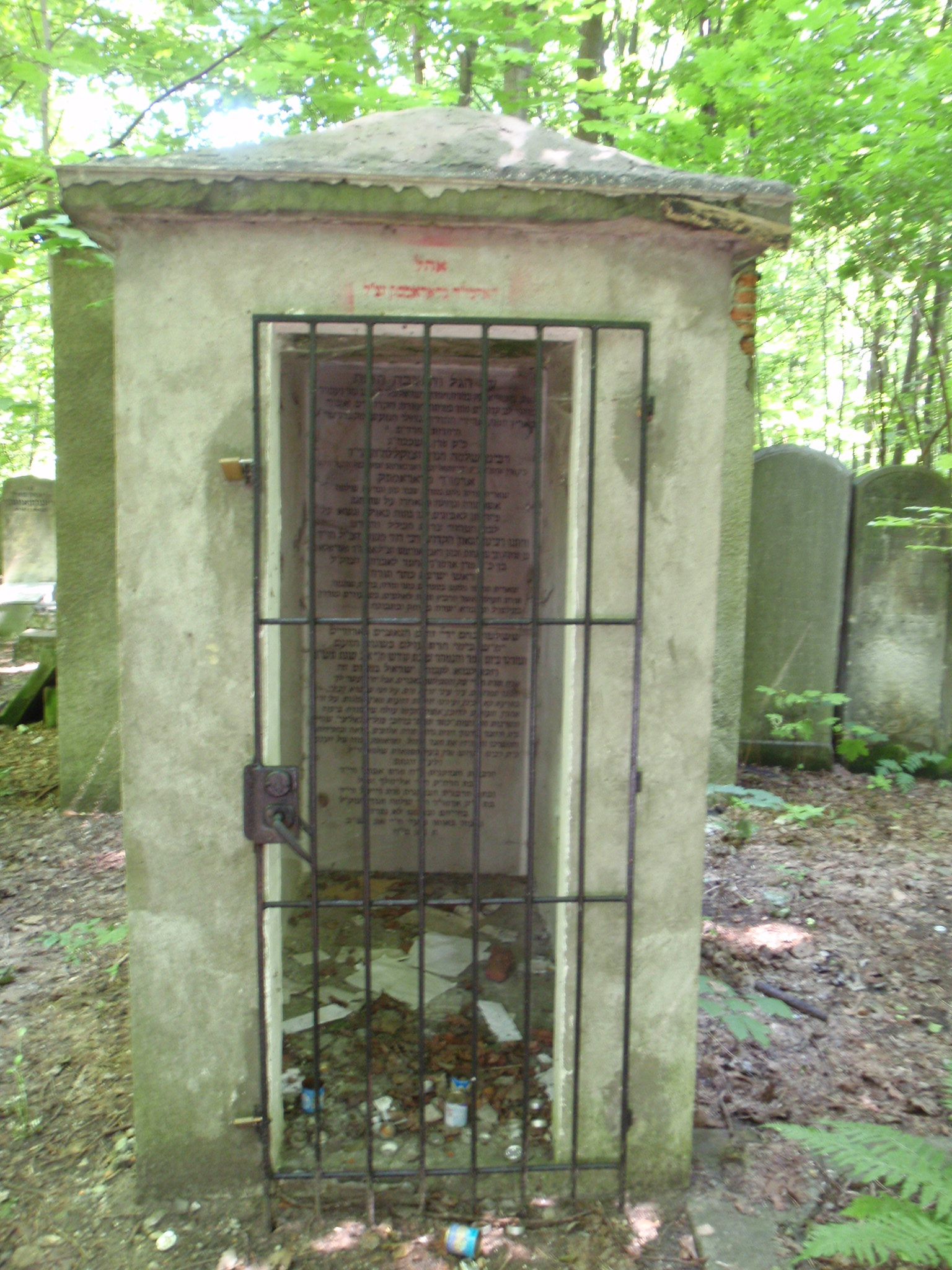
Memorial to Rabbi Shlomo Chanoch Rabinowicz in the Warsaw Jewish cemetery.

On the eve of World War II, Radomsk was the third largest Hasidic dynasty in Poland, after Ger and Alexander. In Kraków, there were more Radomsker shtiebelach than Gerrer shtiebelach.

Following the German invasion of Poland, the Keser Torah yeshivas disbanded and the Rebbe escaped to the town of Alexander, but from there was most likely sent by the Nazis into the Warsaw Ghetto. His son-in-law, Rabbi Dovid Moshe Rabinowicz, was also incarcerated in the Warsaw Ghetto, where he continued to deliver shiurim to Keser Torah students. The Rebbe and all the members of his family, including his only daughter, son-in-law, and their infant son, were shot to death during the Aktion of 1 August 1942. They were buried in a mass grave in Warsaw's main cemetery. With the Rebbe's death, the father-to-son lineage of Radomsker rebbes came to an end. (The Rebbe's brother, Rabbi Elimelech Aryeh Hakohen Rabinowicz, died in Mauthausen.)

== Rebirth in Israel ==
After World War II, Radomsker Hasidim and Keser Torah yeshiva students who had survived the Holocaust established Kollel Keser Torah in Bnei Brak, Israel. In 1965 they approached Rabbi Menachem Shlomo Bornsztain, son of the Sochatchover Rebbe and a nephew of Rabbi David Moshe Rabinowicz, to lead the kollel (Bornsztain was also a direct descendant of the first Radomsker Rebbe, as his grandfather, the second Sochatchover Rebbe, married the daughter of the first Radomsker Rebbe.) Bornsztain accepted the offer and commuted from his home in Tel Aviv to Bnei Brak. When Bornsztain acceded to the leadership of the Sochatchov dynasty in 1965, the Radomsker Hasidim asked him to become their Rebbe as well, and he officially became known as the Sochatchover-Radomsker Rebbe. Following Bornsztain's untimely death in 1969, his eldest son, Rabbi Shmuel Bornsztain, became the Sochatchover Rebbe and another son, Avrohom Nosson Bornsztain, was appointed as the rav of the Radomsker shul in Bnei Brak.

Today Radomsker communities exist in Jerusalem and Bnei Brak, Israel; Brooklyn, New York; Lakewood, New Jersey; and Montreal, Canada. The Radomsker Rav of Boro Park, Rabbi Leibish Frand, heads a Radomsker beis medrash in Brooklyn.

== Music of Radomsk ==
The first Radomsker rebbe, Shlomo Hakohen Rabinowicz, was a hazzan (cantor) and composer of hasidic music. He composed and sang new nigunim (melodies) each year for the High Holy Days and other Jewish holidays. The second Radomsker Rebbe was also musical, and the niggunim of the first two Radomsker rebbes were sung in all Radomsker courts. Chaskel Besser, a Radomsker rabbi in New York after World War II, produced an album titled Niggunei Radomsk (Melodies of Radomsk) to preserve the music of the dynasty.

== Lineage of Radomsk dynastic leadership ==
- First Radomsker Rebbe: Shlomo Hakohen Rabinowicz (1801–1866), author of Tiferes Shlomo. Rebbe from 1843 to 1866.
  - Second Radomsker Rebbe: Avraham Yissachar Dov Hakohen Rabinowicz (1843–1892), son of Shlomo Hakohen Rabinowicz, author of Chesed L'Avraham. Rebbe from 1866 to 1892.
    - Third Radomsker Rebbe: Yechezkel Hakohen Rabinowicz (1864–1910), son of Avraham Yissachar Dov Hakohen Rabinowicz, author of Kenesses Yechezkel. Rebbe from 1892 to 1910.
      - Fourth Radomsker Rebbe: Shlomo Chanoch Hakohen Rabinowicz (d. 1942), son of Yechezkel Hakohen Rabinowicz. Rebbe from 1910 to 1942.
    - Krimilover Rebbe: Nosson Nachum Rabinowicz, a son of Avraham Yissachar Dov Rabinowicz
      - Radomsker Rosh Yeshiva : David Moshe Rabinowicz, son of Nosson Nachum Rabinowicz and a son-in-law of Shlomo Chanoch Rabinowicz.
        - Sochatchover-Radomsker Rebbe: Menachem Shlomo Bornsztain (1934–1969), grandson of Nosson Nachum Rabinowicz. Rebbe from 1965 to 1969.
          - Radomsker Rav - Bnei Brak: Nosson Bornsztain, a son of Menachem Shlomo Bornsztain, is currently the Rav of the Radomsker Kehila in Bnei Brak, Israel.
        - Radomsker Mashpiah and Radziner Rebbe: Avrohom Yissochor Englard, grandson of Nosson Nachum Rabinowicz, was instrumental in founding the Radomsker Kehilla in Boro Park and would conduct a tish there on many occasions.
          - Radomsker Rav - Boro Park: Yeshayahu Englard, son of Avrohom Yissochor, was one of the Rabbonim of the Radomsker kehilla in Brooklyn, he died during the COVID-19 pandemic.
          - Radomsker Rav -Boro Park: Leibish Frand, a son-in-law of a descendant of Shlomo Rabinowicz acts as Present Rav in Radomsker Kehila in Brooklyn NY.
