= Shlomo Rabinowicz =

Polish rabbi (1801–1866)

- Title: First Radomsker Rebbe

Personal life
- Born: Shlomo Hakohen Rabinowicz; 1801 Włoszczowa, Poland
- Died: 16 March 1866 (29 Adar 5626) Radomsko, Poland
- Buried: Radomsko; 16 March 1866
- Spouse: Gitele
- Children: Leibusz; Hirsz Meir; Avraham Yissachar Dov; Sarah; Rikvah; Rochel
- Parent: Dov Tzvi Rabinowicz (father)
- Dynasty: Radomsk

Religious life
- Religion: Judaism

Jewish leader
- Successor: Avraham Yissachar Dov Rabinowicz
- Began: 1843
- Ended: 1866
- Main work: Tiferes Shlomo
- Dynasty: Radomsk

Shlomo Hakohen Rabinowicz (also spelled Rabinowitz, Rabinowich, Rabinovitch) (1801 – 16 March 1866) was the first Rebbe of the Radomsk Hasidic dynasty and one of the great Hasidic masters of 19th-century Poland. He is known as the Tiferes Shlomo after the title of his sefer, which is considered a classic in Hasidic literature.

== Early life ==
Rabinowicz's year of birth is variously cited as 1795, 1796, 1800, 1801, or 1803. He was born in Włoszczowa, Poland to Dov Zvi (d. 1839), the av beis din (head of the rabbinical court) of Włoszczowa. Like most of the Jews of Poland, he was called by his first name and patronymic; his children were the first to begin using the surname Rabinowicz. He was a descendant of Nathan Nata Spira (1585 – 1633), a leading Polish Kabbalist and author of Megaleh Amukos.

Rabinowicz studied in the yeshiva in Piotrków Trybunalski, where he was regarded as a prodigy. By his bar mitzvah, he knew the entire Urim Ve'tumim of Yonatan Eibeshutz by heart and had composed his own chiddushim (novel Torah thoughts). Late at night, he would study Kabbalah texts.

Later he became a disciple of Rabbi Meir of Apta, who was, in turn, a disciple of the Chozeh of Lublin. He became a Hasid of rabbis Meir of Apta, Fishele of Strikov, Yehoshua of Pshedburz and Moshe Biderman of Lelov. He also traveled to the Modzitzer rebbe, and to rabbis Yechezkel of Kuzmir, and Chaim Halberstam of Sanz. Though he was born 14 years after the death of Rebbe Elimelech of Lizhensk, he also considered himself a disciple of the latter and visited his grave every year. Since as a Kohen he was not allowed to come in contact with graves, he had a wall built around the area so that he could pray there.

== Move to Radomsk ==
Rabinowicz married Gitele, who lived to the age of 92. After his marriage, he studied in the beth midrash in Włoszczowa while his wife ran a small store to support them. The store was not successful, however, and for this reason, when Rabinowicz was offered the position of Rav of the small Polish town of Radomsko (Radomsk), his rebbe, Rabbi Meir of Apta, advised him to accept. Rabinowicz became Rav of Radomsk in 1834. His weekly salary was 15 Polish gulden (2 rubles and 25 kopeks), an apartment, and an etrog for Sukkot. Later his salary increased to 6 rubles per week, and his wife was allowed to run her own business.

When Rabbi Moshe Biderman of Lelov moved to Jerusalem in 1850 and instructed his Hasidim to follow Rabinowicz, the latter's influence as a rebbe grew significantly. He went on to attract thousands of Hasidim and Radomsk grew into a major center of Hasidut. The masses revered their Rebbe for his lofty prayers, beautiful singing voice, and benevolence towards their needs, while the more scholarly Hasidim admired his profound discourses in Halakha and Kabbalah. Rabinowicz was a master at interpreting Torah verses through gematria and Hebrew letter permutations. Among his Hasidim were philosopher Aaron Marcus Verus and physician Chaim David Bernard of Piotrków.

When local Jews were conscripted by the Czar's army, he and his gabbai went door to door, collecting money to bribe the officials to release them. He also collected money for the poor to buy firewood in the winter, and to make matzos at Pesach. He spoke out often on the challenges facing the Jewish people of his day, including assimilation. In 1862 he pronounced a ban on the wearing of hoop skirts by Jewish women.

Rabinowicz was also a chazzan and composer of Hasidic music. One Shavuot. he visited the Tzadik of Kuzmir, Rabbi Emanuel of Pashdeborz, and was asked to lead the Akdamut piyyut. Rabinowicz requested the accompaniment of 80 singers, and the resulting choir, with his voice soaring over all, had a powerful effect. Rabinowicz used his soul-stirring nigunim to rouse his Hasidim to great fervor on Shabbat and Jewish holidays. He sent money to one of his Hasidim in Safed, Israel so that the latter would organize a Radomsker Shalosh Seudos meal every Shabbat at which his niggunim would be sung.

== Death and legacy ==
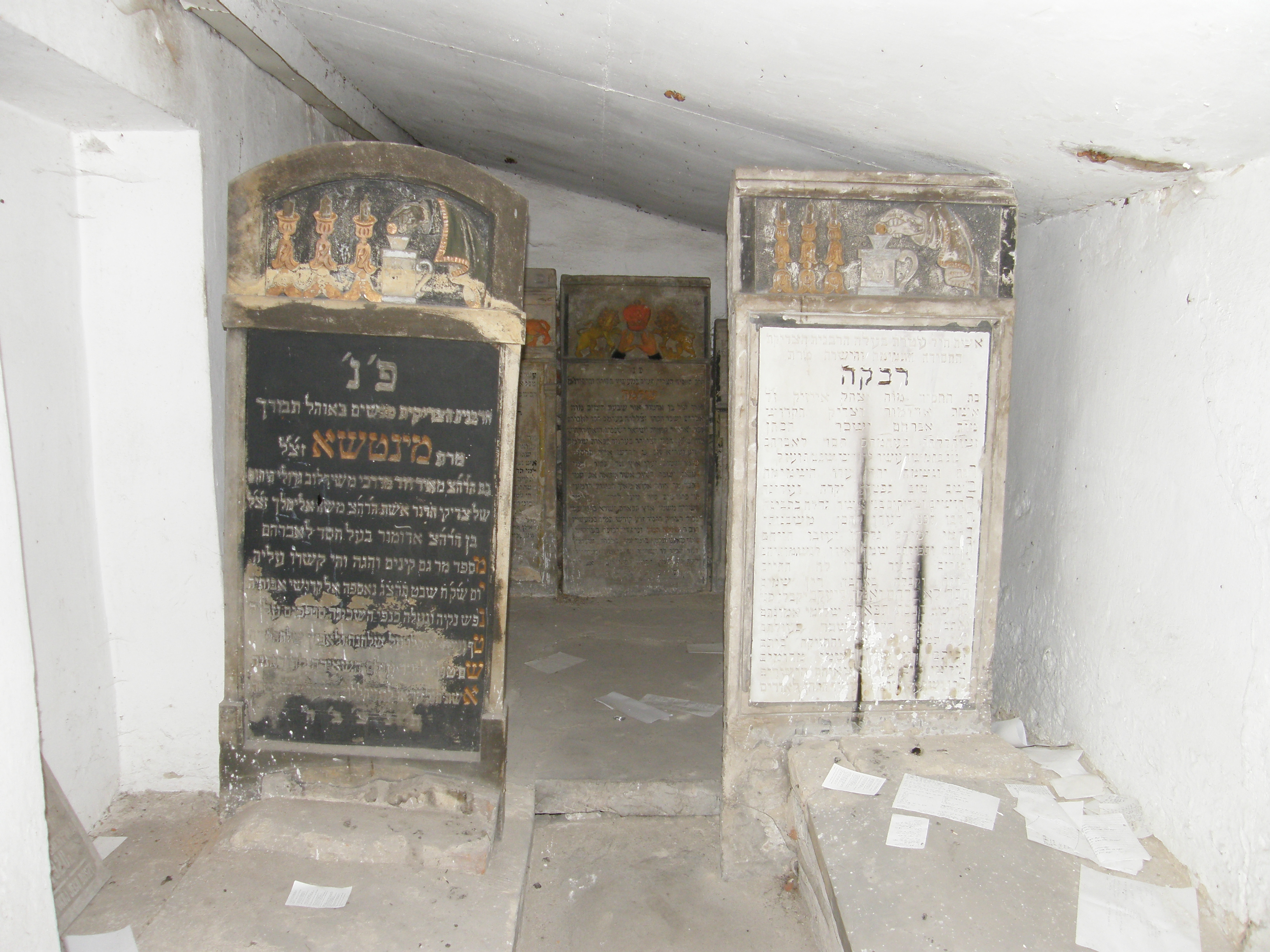
Rabinowicz ohel in Radomsko

Rabinowicz died on Friday, 16 March 1866 (29 Adar 5626) and was buried later that day in an ohel on the grounds of the Jewish cemetery in Radomsk; His son and grandson were later buried in the same ohel.

He left three daughters and three sons, including Hirsz (Zvi) Meir (d. 1902), who presided as av beis din of Radomsk and succeeded his father as rabbi of the town; and Avraham Yissachar Dov, the Chesed LeAvraham (1843–1892), who succeeded his father as Radomsker rebbe.

Rabinowicz's discourses on the Chumash and chagim (Jewish festivals) were published posthumously in Warsaw in 1867–1869 as the two-volume Tiferes Shlomo. In this work, Rabbi Rabinowicz explains the deeper meaning and allusions contained within the Torah verses, drawing on teachings of Kabbalah and Jewish mystical thought. Considered a textbook of Hasidic thought, Tiferes Shlomo met with widespread acclaim and has been continuously reprinted.

== Rebbes of Radomsk ==
1. Shlomo Hakohen Rabinowicz, the Tiferes Shlomo (1801–1866)
2. Avraham Yissachar Dov Hakohen Rabinowicz, the Chesed LeAvraham (1843–1892)
3. Yechezkel Hakohen Rabinowicz, the Kenesses Yechezkel (1862–1910)
4. Shlomo Chanoch Hakohen Rabinowicz, the Shivchei Kohen (1882–1942)
5. Menachem Shlomo Bornsztain, Sochatchover-Radomsker Rebbe (1934–1969)
