= Keser Torah Radomsk =

Keser Torah Radomsk (Hebrew: כתר תורה רדומסק), also transliterated Keter Torah Radomsk, is the name of yeshivas and kollels in Israel and the United States affiliated with the Radomsk Hasidic dynasty. The name was originally coined for a network of 36 yeshivas in pre-war Poland founded by the fourth Radomsker rebbe, Shlomo Chanoch Rabinowicz, and led by his son-in-law David Moshe Rabinowicz.

== Establishment in Poland ==
In 1926 Shlomo Chanoch Rabinowicz announced his plan for a network of Radomsker yeshivas.

Soon afterwards eight yeshivas were opened in Będzin, Podgórze, Chrzanów, Wolbrom, Oświęcim, Częstochowa, Łódź and Kraków. In Sosnowiec Rabinowicz also founded Kibbutz Govoha, a high-level study group exclusively for advanced students and avreichim (married students). He appointed his son-in-law and first cousin, David Moshe Rabinowicz to head it. He also served as rosh yeshiva of the Keser Torah network.

By 1930, nine yeshivas and the kibbutz were functioning. On the eve of World War II there were 36 Keser Torah yeshivas enrolling over 4,000 students in Poland.

Though Hasidic in nature, the yeshivas did not promote Radomsker Hasidism, nor were students and staff exclusively Radomsker Hasidim. (In Sosnowiec, for example, the rosh yeshiva was a Ger Hasid.) Each yeshiva had its own rosh yeshiva and initially studied its own masechta (section of the Talmud); later, all the yeshivas studied the same masechta at the same time.

With the German invasion of Poland in 1939, the yeshivas disbanded. Shlomo and David Rabinowicz were both imprisoned in the Warsaw Ghetto. Shlomo Rabinowicz and his family, including his only daughter and son-in-law and their infant son, were murdered by Nazis who shot them to death on 1 August 1942.

== Rebirth in Israel ==
After World War II, Radomsker Hasidim and Keser Torah yeshiva students who had survived the Holocaust founded Kollel Keser Torah in Bnei Brak, Israel. In 1965 they asked Menachem Shlomo Bornsztain, son of the Sochatchover rebbe and a nephew of David Moshe Rabinowicz, to head the kollel. Bornsztain, who became known as the Sochatchover-Radomsker rebbe, died in an automobile accident in 1969. After Bornsztain's death, his eldest son, Shmuel Bornsztain, became head of Kollel Keser Torah.

== Locations ==
- Bnei Brak, Israel: Kollel Keser Torah opened in the 1940s.
- Jerusalem, Israel: Yeshiva Gedola Keser Torah Radomsk opened in the Bayit Vegan neighborhood in 1996. Like its namesake in pre-war Poland, the yeshiva includes a kibbutz govoha (high-level study group) for advanced students and avreichim (married students).
- Lakewood, New Jersey: Kollel Keser Torah Radomsk, an evening kollel, opened in 2000.
- Montreal, Canada: Kollel Keser Torah Radomsk opened in 1986. Its founding president was Pinhas Hirschprung, the Chief Rabbi of Montreal.
