= Mstów, Silesian Voivodeship =

Mstów
- Village
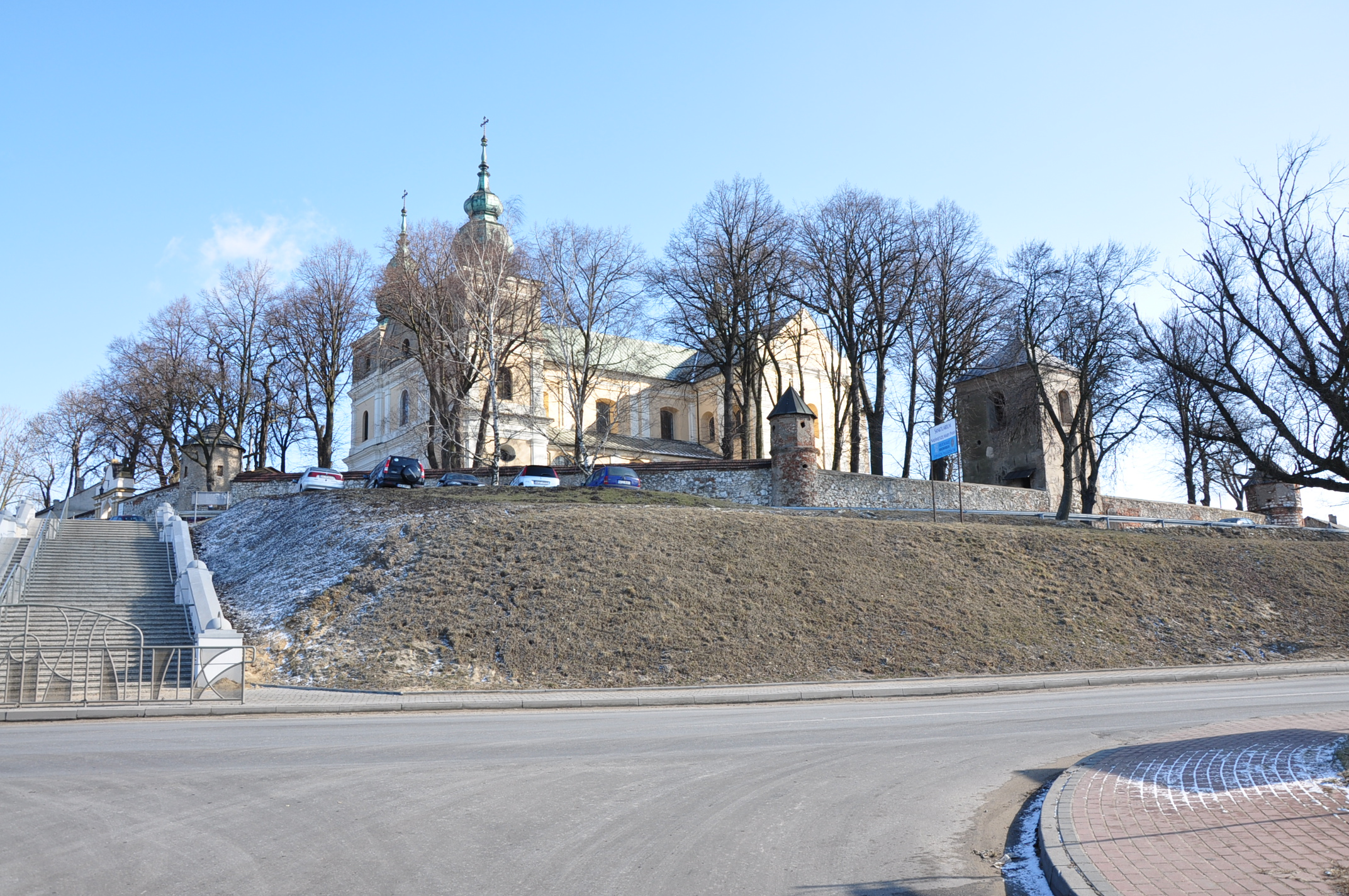
- Monastery surrounded by defensive walls

- Location within Poland
- Coordinates: 50°49′40″N 19°17′14″E
- Country: Poland
- Voivodeship: Silesian
- County: Częstochowa
- Gmina: Mstów

Population
  - Total: 1,704
- Time zone: UTC+1 (CET)
  - Summer (DST): UTC+2 (CEST)
- Postal code: 42-244

Mstów [mstuf] (Yiddish: Amstov – אמסטאוו) is a village in Częstochowa County, Silesian Voivodeship, in southern Poland. It is the seat of an administrative district called Gmina Mstów. Mstów lies on the Warta river, in western part of historic province of Lesser Poland. The village is known for its fortified Roman Catholic monastery.

== History ==
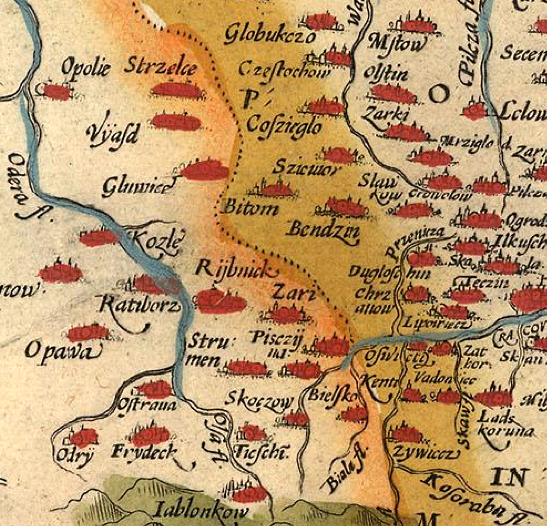
Fragment of a map from 1592 with Mstow marked

Mstów was first mentioned as Mstowo in 1193, when it belonged to the congregation of Canons Regular of the Lateran from Wrocław. Sometime in the early 13th century, a large monastery was built here. It burned in a great fire of 1566, then the complex was rebuilt and destroyed several times. More destruction came during World War I, when several German-Russian skirmishes took place here in early stages of the conflict. During those fights, the towers and defensive walls of the ancient church were destroyed, as well as the roof of the nave. The complex was gradually rebuilt in the 1920s and 1930s.

In the Kingdom of Poland and the Polish–Lithuanian Commonwealth, fields around the monastery were used by Lesser Poland's nobility for its sejmiks (local councils). Among notable guests of Mstów was Queen Bona Sforza, wife of Sigismund I of Poland. Mstów, whose name probably comes from an ancient given name Msta, received its town charter in 1279, from Duke Bolesław V the Chaste. Several years before that event, in 1212, a council of Polish bishops took place here, and among its participants was Wincenty Kadłubek. The very fact that a meeting like this was organized in Mstów means that it had already been an important location, and it had the monastery complex ready to host the bishops.

In the Middle Ages Mstów was located along an important merchant route running from Kraków to Greater Poland. The town possessed a toll bridge on the Warta river, and merchants stayed here on the way to their destinations. As a result, a fair was established in Mstów some time in the first half of the 12th century. In the course of time, to guard the route, wooden strongholds were erected along the road. In 1220, the Bishop of Kraków, Iwo Odrowąż, founded a defensive Church here. Mstów emerged as a main urban center of northwestern Lesser Poland, and in the 13th century, the town was destroyed several times by the Mongols (see Mongol invasion of Poland). In 1260, the Mongols burned the monastery; their last raid took place in 1266.

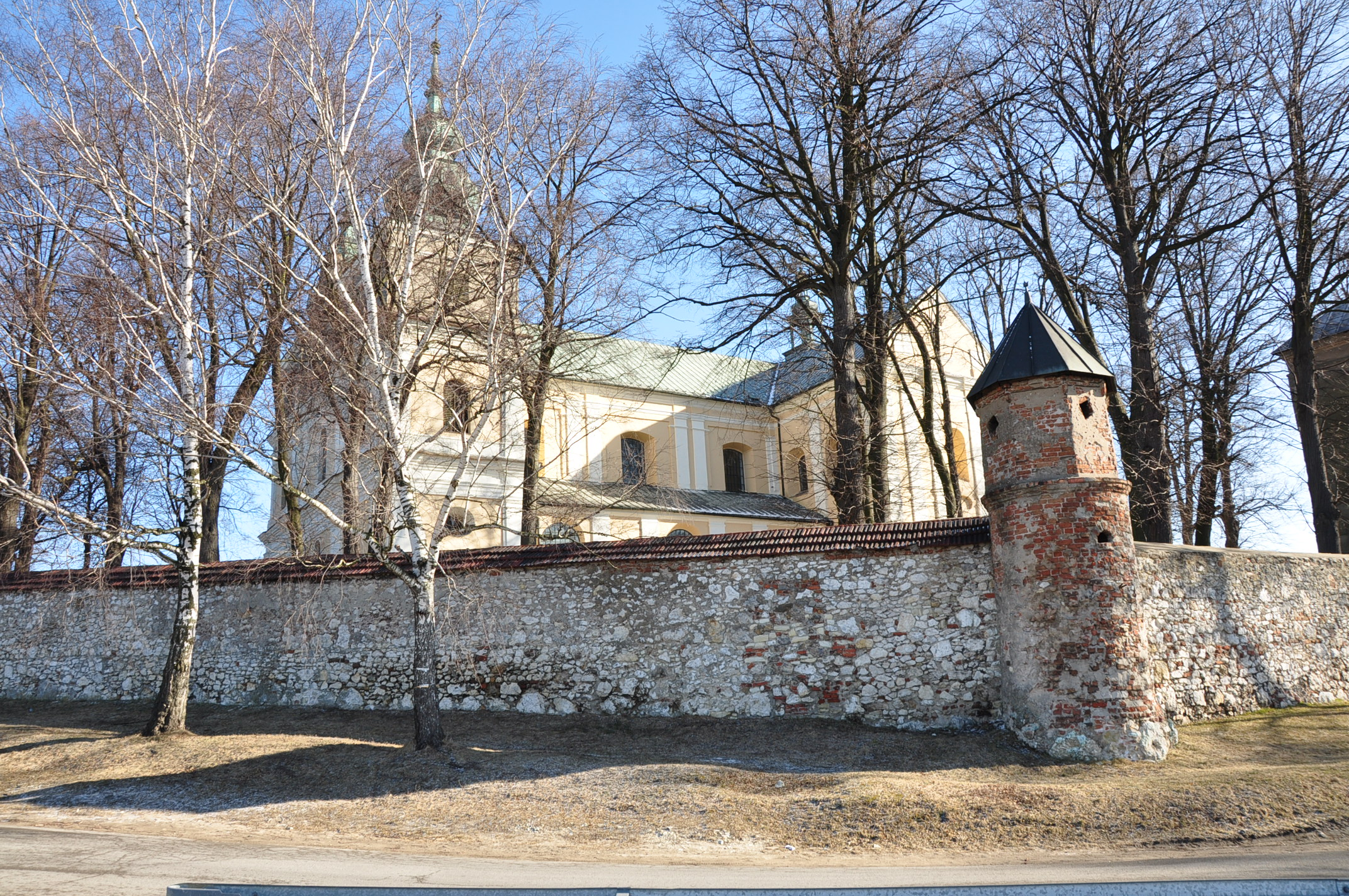
The church

After Mstów had received its town charter, a market square was designed, with rectangular streets, whose shape has not been changed. The town had its local government, and despite widespread destruction following the raid of King Wenceslaus II of Bohemia (1292), it quickly recovered, with several artisan guilds being active here. In 1327, Mstów was visited by King Ladislaus the Short, and following this visit, for unknown reasons the post of a local starosta was transferred to the town of Olsztyn, where a castle was built.

During the Polish–Lithuanian–Teutonic War, the Mstów monastery was a gathering point for royal troops. In the 15th century, Mstów had 105 houses, and remained an important location, where in 1474 Polish troops gathered under King Casimir IV, for a Silesian campaign against King of Hungary Matthias Corvinus. Mstów had its coat of arms and a seal, with an inscription SI - Gillum - CIYITTATIS - MSTHUOW (1564). At that time, and until 1795, Mstów belonged to Lelów County in the Kraków Voivodeship in the Lesser Poland Province of the Kingdom of Poland.

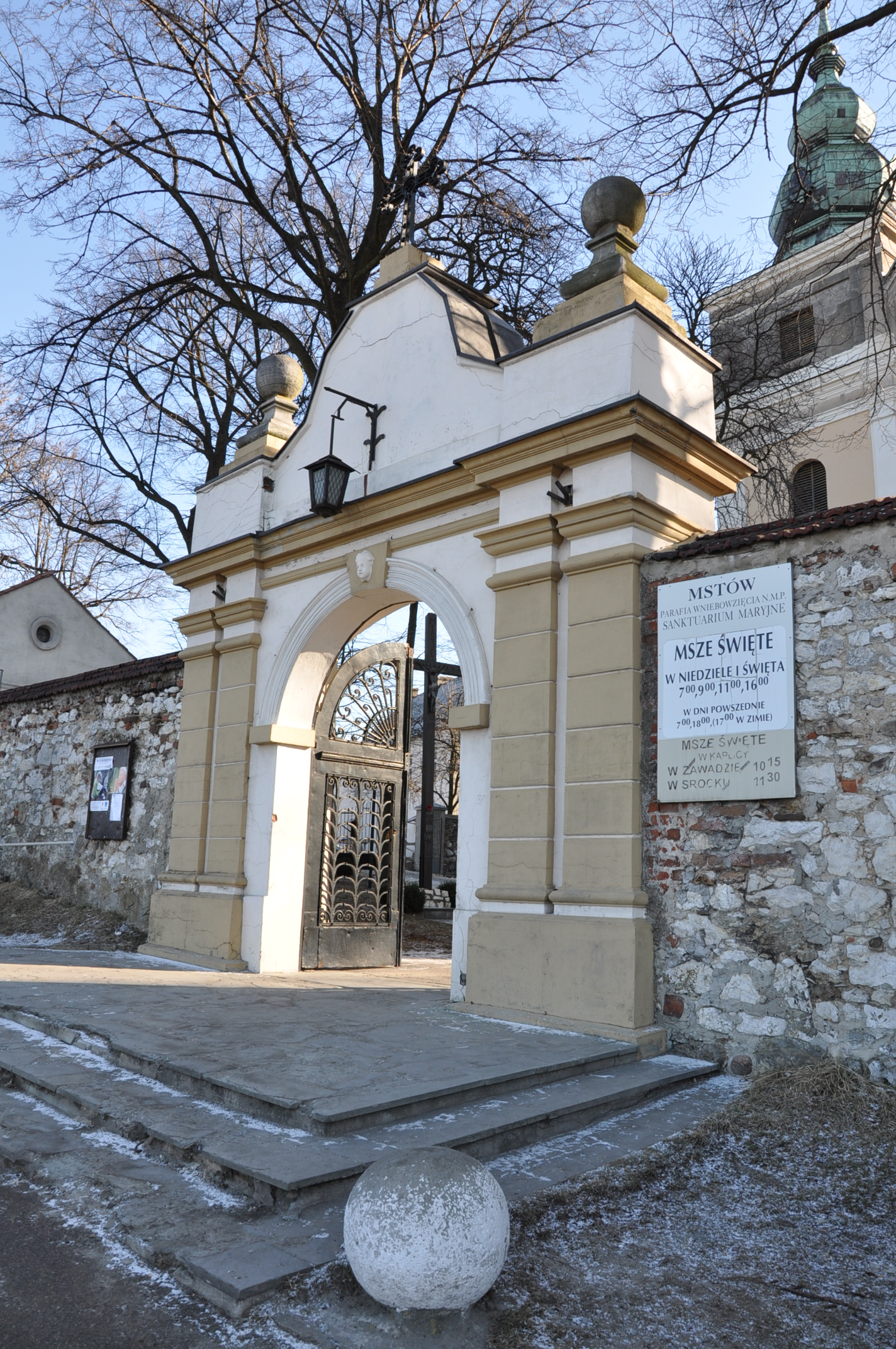
Entrance to the monastery

In the 17th century the merchant route lost its importance, which resulted in Mstów's decline to the benefit of nearby Częstochowa. In 1655 (see the Deluge), the Swedes captured the town and the monastery, destroying it completely. Mstów lost around 50% of inhabitants, and the destruction was so widespread that the town never recovered. In 1697, a Baroque synagogue was built, as the number of Jews grew. Mstów was destroyed in 1709 by Russian troops during the Great Northern War.

In the Third Partition of Poland in 1795, the town was split in half, along the Warta river. The district on the right bank of the river became part of Prussian New Silesia, and the rest was captured by Austria. In 1801 Mstów was ravaged by a fire. Poles regained control of the Prussian-held part of Mstów in 1807 and of the Austrian-held part in 1809, and it became part of the short-lived Polish Duchy of Warsaw. After the dissolution of the duchy in 1815, the town became part of Russian-controlled Congress Poland. As a result of Russian discriminatory policies (see Pale of Settlement), by the 1850s, one-third of its population was Jewish. The residents actively supported the January Uprising, for which Mstów lost its town charter in 1870. After another significant fire in 1879, Mstów was almost deserted; most of its former inhabitants moved to the quickly developing industrial center of Częstochowa.

=== 20th century ===
After World War I, in 1918, Poland regained independence and control of Mstów. In 1933, already in Kielce Voivodeship, it had 284 houses and 2,129 inhabitants.

Following the German-Soviet invasion of Poland, which started World War II in September 1939, Mstów was occupied by Germany until 1945. The village suffered further losses in the war. Its historic buildings were destroyed by the Germans, and its Jewish population was decimated in the Holocaust.

In 1970 Mstów had 314 houses and the population of 1,676, most of which were farmers and agricultural workers. In 1993 the local council undertook an initiative aimed at recovering the town charter, but it failed.

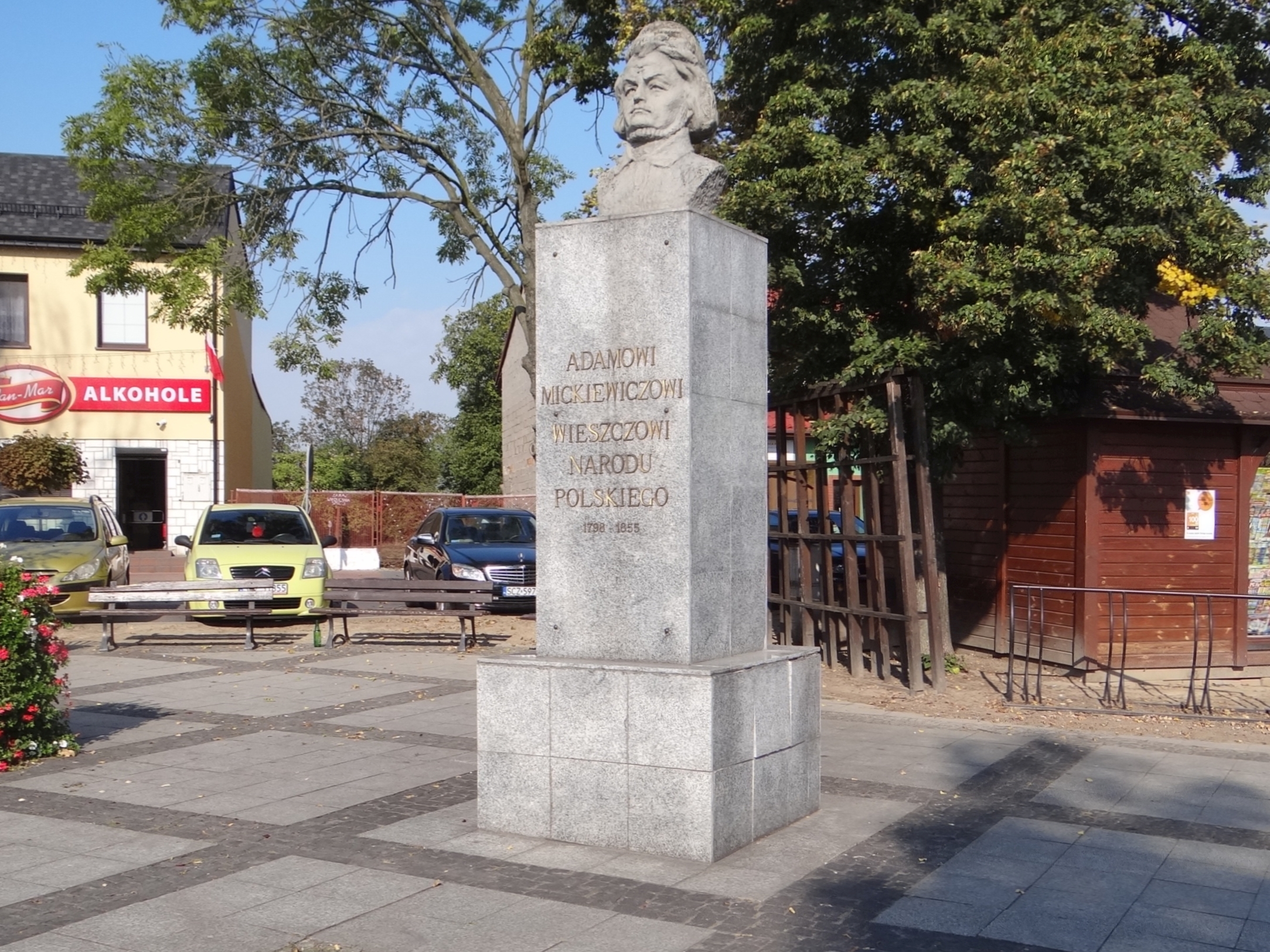
Adam Mickiewicz Monument in Mstów

== Notable people ==
- Efraim Tzvi Einhorn (1851–1901), Rabbi and Rosh Yeshiva of the Town
- Dov Berish Einhorn (1877–1942), Rabbi and Rosh Yeshiva of the Town
