= Shlomo Chanoch Rabinowicz =

Polish rabbi

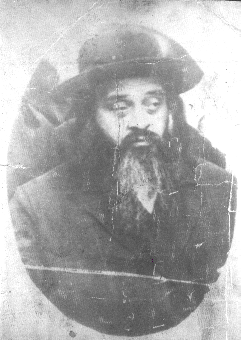
- Title: Fourth Radomsker Rebbe

Personal life
- Born: Shlomo Chanoch Hakohen Rabinowicz; 1882 Radomsko, Poland
- Died: 1 August 1942 (18 Av 5702) (age 60) Warsaw Ghetto, Poland
- Buried: Warsaw, Poland
- Children: Reizel
- Parent: Yechezek Hakohen Rabinowicz (father)
- Dynasty: Radomsk

Religious life
- Religion: Judaism

Jewish leader
- Predecessor: Yechezkel Hakohen Rabinowicz
- Began: 1910
- Ended: 1942
- Main work: Shivchei Kohen
- Dynasty: Radomsk

Shlomo Chanoch Hakohen Rabinowicz (also spelled Rabinowitz, Rabinowich, Rabinovitch) (1882 – 1 August 1942) was the fourth and last rebbe of the Radomsk Hasidic dynasty. He was the eldest son of the third Radomsker rebbe, Yechezkel Rabinowicz and great-grandson of the founder of the dynasty, Shlomo Rabinowicz, known as the Tiferes Shlomo. Under his leadership, Radomsk became the third largest Hasidic dynasty in Poland, after Ger and Alexander. Rabinowicz built a network of 36 yeshivas across Poland and Galicia that enrolled over 4,000 students by 1939. He was murdered in the Warsaw Ghetto together with his entire family.

== Biography ==
Rabinowicz was born in Radomsko, Poland, the eldest of two sons of the third Radomsker rebbe, Yechezkel Hakohen Rabinowicz. His wife was the daughter of a rabbi and they had one daughter, Reizel, who married her father's first cousin, David Moshe Rabinowicz, in 1929.

Rabinowicz succeeded as rebbe on his father's death in 1910. On the eve of World War II, Radomsk was the third largest Hasidic dynasty in Poland, after Ger and Alexander.

He was wealthy and owned a glass factory and homes in Berlin, Warsaw, and Sosnowiec, where he lived after World War I. He also amassed an extensive personal library of old manuscripts and prints.

Although he suffered from diabetes like his father and grandfather, who both died of complications from diabetes when they were 48, his life was extended by the discovery of insulin in 1921.

== Keser Torah yeshiva network ==
World War I uprooted hundreds of thousands of Jews and decimated established communities. Traditionally, Hasidic youth had learned Torah from their elders and picked up the customs and lore of their Hasidic groups in the shtiebelach of Poland and Galicia. Now the Radomsker Rebbe proposed a new method of Hasidic education. On Lag B'Omer 1926, he announced his plan to establish a network of yeshivas called Keser Torah (Crown of Torah). Soon after, eight yeshivas were opened in Będzin, Podgórze, Chrzanów, Wolbrom, Oświęcim, Częstochowa, Łódź and Kraków. Though Hasidic in nature, the yeshivas did not promote Radomsker Hasidut, nor did they staff only Radomsker Hasidim. Each yeshiva had its own rosh yeshiva and initially studied its own Talmudic tractate; later, all the yeshivas studied the same tractate at the same time. The Rebbe paid for the entire operation, including staff salaries, food, and student lodging, out of his own pocket.

At the same time, the Rebbe established Kibbutz Govoha in the city of Sosnowiece exclusively for high-level students and avreichim (married students) and appointed his son-in-law, Rabbi David Moshe Hakohen Rabinowicz (1906–1942), a brilliant Torah scholar, to head it. Rabbi David Moshe also served as rosh yeshiva of the entire Keser Torah network, monitoring students' progress, delivering shiurim, and administering the end of the semester tests. By 1930, nine yeshivas and the kibbutz were functioning. Over the following decade, more yeshivas were added. On the eve of World War II, there were 36 Keser Torah yeshivas enrolling over 4,000 students in Poland. The yeshivas were disbanded after the German invasion of Poland in 1939, and most of their students were murdered in the Holocaust.

== World War II ==
When war broke out, the Rebbe was in Lódź. His Hasidim completed arrangements to fly him to Italy by mid-1940, but he refused, saying, "I want to be with all the Jews". The Rebbe eventually escaped to Alexander, but from there was most likely sent by the Nazis into the Warsaw Ghetto.

The Radomsker Rebbe was one of the prominent Hasidic Rebbes incarcerated in the Warsaw Ghetto; others included the Piaseczner Rebbe; the Alexander Rebbe, the Sochatchover Rebbe, the Krimilover Rebbe, and the Strickover Rebbe. Rabinowicz was registered as a worker in the Shultz factory. Notwithstanding the danger, he refused to shave off his beard.

The Rebbe's son-in-law, Rabbi David Moshe Rabinowicz, gave regular shiurim (lectures) in the Warsaw Ghetto, and also composed many chiddushim (novel Torah thoughts) which his students recorded. All of these chiddushim as well as the sefarim he had written previously were lost in the war.

== Death and legacy ==
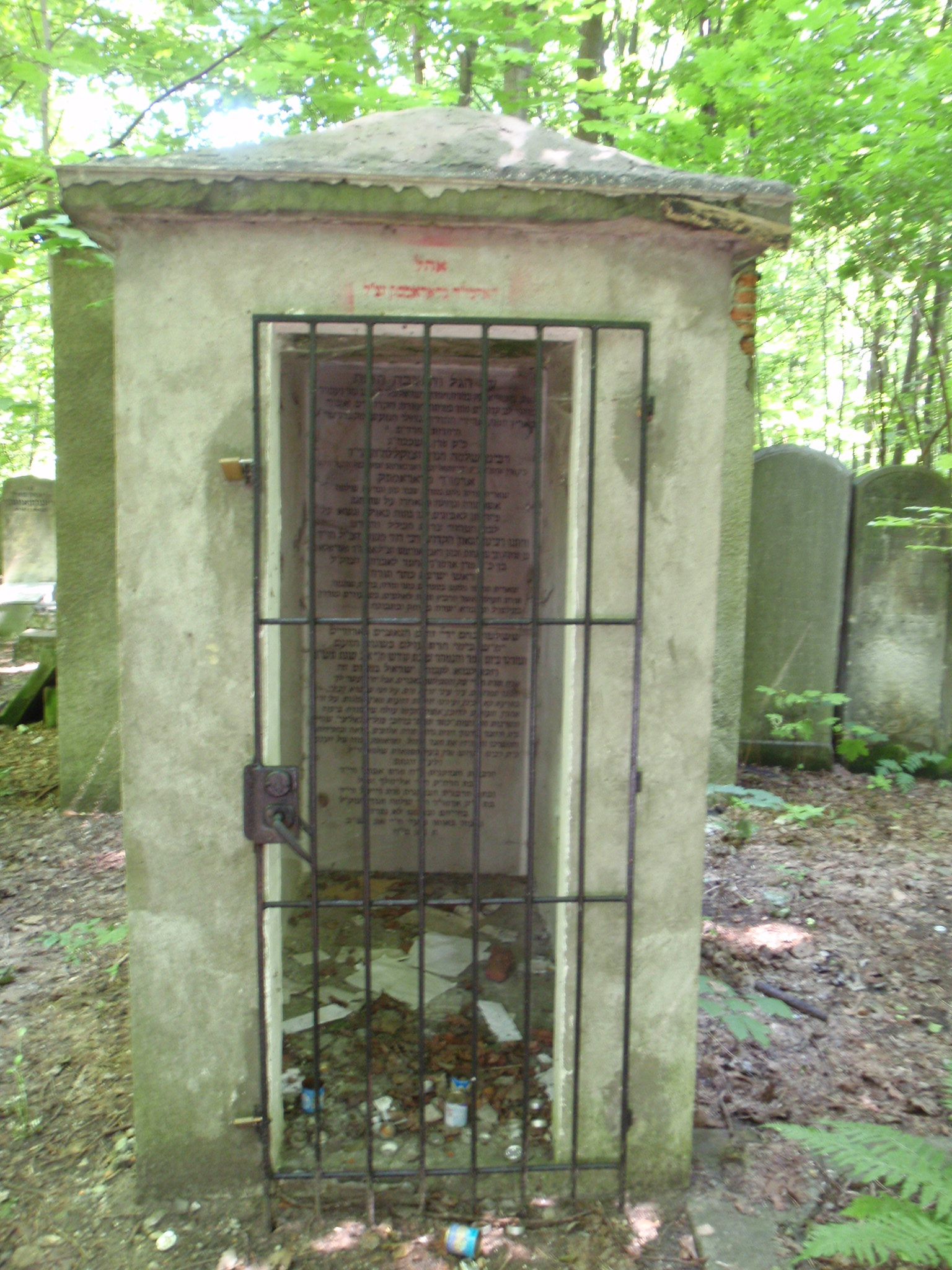
Memorial to Rabinowicz in the Warsaw Jewish cemetery.

Rabinowicz and all the members of his family, including his only daughter, son-in-law, and their infant son, were murdered by the Nazis on 1 August 1942. When the Nazis stormed his house to deport its residents to the Chelmno extermination camp, Rabinowicz refused to leave, saying, "I know you've come to kill me. I prefer to die here in my house and not in a car filled with poison gas". He then recited the Shema ("Hear, Jewish people, the Lord our God, the Lord is one") and was shot in the head when he reached the last word, Echad (One). His family members were shot together with him. They were buried in a mass grave in Warsaw's main cemetery.

With his death the father-to-son lineage of Radomsker rebbes came to an end. His brother, Rabbi Elimelech Aryeh Hakohen Rabinowicz, died in the Mauthausen concentration camp.

In 1965 Menachem Shlomo Bornsztain of Sochatchov (whose grandfather, the second Sochatchover rebbe, Shmuel Bornsztain, married the granddaughter of the first Radomsker rebbe, Shlomo Rabinowicz)) become the Radomsker rebbe as well and was known as the Sochatchover-Radomsker rebbe.

Rabinowicz's teachings and those of his son-in-law, David Moshe Rabinowicz, were compiled in the book Shivchei Kohen ("Praises of the Priest").

== Rebbes of Radomsk ==
1. Shlomo Hakohen Rabinowicz, the Tiferes Shlomo (1801–1866)
2. Avraham Yissachar Dov Hakohen Rabinowicz, the Chesed LeAvraham (1843–1892)
3. Yechezkel Hakohen Rabinowicz, the Kenesses Yechezkel (1862–1910)
4. Shlomo Chanoch Hakohen Rabinowicz, the Shivchei Kohen (1882–1942)
5. Menachem Shlomo Bornsztain, Sochatchover-Radomsker Rebbe (1934–1969)
