= Avraham Yissachar Dov Rabinowicz =

Polish rabbi

- Title: Second Radomsker Rebbe

Personal life
- Born: Avraham Yissachar Dov Hakohen Rabinowicz; November 15, 1843 Radomsko, Poland
- Died: September 5, 1892 (aged 48) Radomsko
- Buried: Radomsko
- Parent: Shlomo Hakohen Rabinowicz (father)
- Dynasty: Radomsk

Religious life
- Religion: Judaism

Jewish leader
- Predecessor: Shlomo Hakohen Rabinowicz
- Successor: Yechezkel Hakohen Rabinowicz
- Began: 1866
- Ended: 1892
- Main work: Chesed L'Avraham
- Dynasty: Radomsk

Avraham Yissachar Dov Hakohen Rabinowicz (also Avraham Yissachar Ber Rabinowicz, Rabinowitz, Rabinowich, or Rabinovitch) (November 15, 1843 – September 5, 1892) was the second rebbe of the Radomsk Hasidic dynasty. He was the youngest son and successor of Shlomo Rabinowicz, who founded the dynasty in the Polish town of Radomsko (Radomsk) in 1843. He is known as the Chesed L'Avraham after the title a work he wrote.

== Biography ==
Rabinowicz was born in Radomsk, where his father served as rabbi. In 1843, the year of his birth, his father founded his Hasidic dynasty, becoming the first Radomsker rebbe.

Rabinowicz was 23 years old when his father died and he succeeded him, leading the Radomsker Hasidim for 26 years until his death.

Rabinowicz headed a committee established by his father which raised money to ransom new recruits from the forced conscription of young Jewish men to the army, which was rife with antisemitism.

== Family ==
Rabinowicz married the daughter of a rabbi. and had four daughters and five sons, including Yechezkel, who succeeded him as Radomsker rebbe.

== Death and legacy ==
Rabinowicz, who suffered from diabetes, died in Radomsk on September 5, 1892 (13 Elul 5652) and was buried there next to his father. His second son and successor, Yechezkel, was also diabetic and also died at age 48. His grandson, Shlomo Chanoch Rabinowicz, also had diabetes, but as insulin was invented in 1921, did not die of it; he was murdered by the Nazis in the Warsaw Ghetto at the age of 60.

Rabinowicz's Torah teachings were compiled under the title Chesed L'Avraham, published in Piotrkow in 1893.

== Rebbes of Radomsk ==
1. Shlomo Hakohen Rabinowicz, the Tiferes Shlomo (1801–1866)
2. Avraham Yissachar Dov Hakohen Rabinowicz, the Chesed L'Avraham (1843–1892)
3. Yechezkel Hakohen Rabinowicz, the Kenesses Yechezkel (1862–1910)
4. Shlomo Chanoch Hakohen Rabinowicz, the Shivchei Kohen (1882–1942)
5. Menachem Shlomo Bornsztain, Sochatchover-Radomsker Rebbe (1934–1969)
6. Avrohom Nosson Bornsztain, Radomsker Rebbe
