= Tzvi Hersh Mordechai Bonhardt =

Personal life
- Born: Tzvi Hersh Mordechai Bonhardt; September 26, 1826 Przysucha, Poland
- Died: December 7, 1866 (aged 40) Przysucha, Poland
- Spouse: Tziporah Kalish
- Children: Avraham Simcha Bonhardt, Sarah Ita Bonhardt, Rachel Bonhardt, Henya Roza Bonhardt, Chana Bonhardt, Yitzhak Bonhardt, Golda Laya Bonhardt, Rivka Bonhardt.
- Parents: Avraham Moshe of Peshischa (father); Braindel Faiga Raphael's (mother)
- Dynasty: Peshischa

Religious life
- Religion: Judaism

Jewish leader
- Dynasty: Peshischa

Tzvi Hersh Mordechai Bonhardt of Peshischa-Vurka (Yiddish: צבי הירש מרדכי באנהאַרד פון פשיסחה-ווארקא; Polish: Hersz Mordechy z Przysuchy; September 26, 1826 - December 7, 1866) was a 19th-century Polish Hasidic Rebbe and scholar who headed a Hasidic court in Przysucha.

== Biography ==
Tzvi Hersh Mordechai Bonhardt was born on September 26, 1826, in Przysucha, Poland. His father Avraham Moshe Bonhardt controversially succeeded his grandfather, Simcha Bunim of Peshischa as the Peshischa rebbe in 1827 and subsequently died the following year, leaving Tzvi Hersh Mordechai Bonhardt and his sister, Sarah Hadas Bonhardt without a father. He was thus raised by his mother Braindel Faiga Raphael (the granddaughter of Yaakov Yitzchak Rabinowicz) and the Vurka Rebbe, Israel Yitzhak Kalish, whose daughter Tziporah he married. Israel Yitzhak Kalish helped Tzvi Hersh Mordechai to establish his own Hasidic court in Przysucha under the jurisdiction of Vurka. Tzvi Hersh Mordechai was said to have been very much like his illustrious grandfather and was known for his rationalistic and individualistic approach to Hasidism that defined the Peshischa movement. He and his wife had nine children, the most notable of which, Yitzhak Bonhardt (1857–1934) was the Rebbe of Zwoleń.
