= Avraham Moshe of Peshischa =

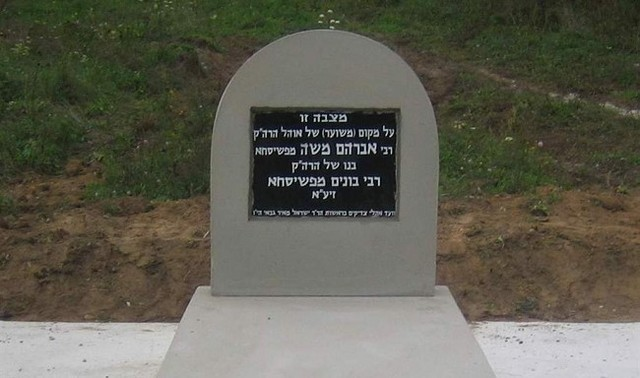
- Grave of R. Avraham Moshe Bonhardt in Biała Rawska
- Title: The Illui Hakudosh

Personal life
- Born: Avraham Moshe Bonhardt; 1800 Przysucha, Poland
- Died: December 27, 1829 (aged 28–29) Biała Rawska, Poland
- Spouse: Braindel Raphael's
- Children: R. Tzvi Hersh Mordechai Bonhardt, Sarah Hadas Bonhardt
- Parents: Simcha Bunim of Peshischa (father); Rebeccah Auvergir-Kogov (mother)
- Dynasty: Peshischa

Religious life
- Religion: Judaism

Jewish leader
- Predecessor: Simcha Bunim of Peshischa
- Successor: Israel Yitzhak Kalish
- Dynasty: Peshischa

Avraham Moshe Bonhardt of Peshischa (Yiddish: אברהם משה בונהרט פון פשיסכע; c. 1800 – December 27, 1829) also known as the Illui Hakudosh (lit. 'The Holy Prodigy') was the contested third Grand Rabbi of Peshischa, succeeding his father R. Simcha Bunim Bonhardt of Peshischa, after his father's death in 1827. He led the less radical sect of Peshischa for two years, until his death in 1829, after which his followers adopted R. Israel Yitzhak Kalish of Vurka as his successor.

== Biography ==
R. Avraham Moshe was born in Przysucha around 1800. In his earliest years, like his father, he was recognized as an Illui (child prodigy). As a young child, he would allegedly spend many hours daily in the nearby forest reciting Psalms in loud tears. At 16 he married Braindel Raphael's, a maternal granddaughter of R. Yaakov Yitzchak Rabinowicz of Peshischa, who was the first Grand Rabbi of Peshischa. At first, his father wanted him to be a merchant and thought the burden of the rabbinic position would be too much for R. Avraham Moshe to handle, yet after much pressure from the Hasidim of Peshischa, R. Avraham Moshe began to take up rabbinic positions. After his father's death, the less radical of his father's pupils such as R. Israel Yitzhak Kalish, R. Yaakov Aryeh Guterman and R. Shraga Fayvel Dancyger supported the succession of R. Avraham Moshe, while the more radical of his father's followers, supported R. Menachem Mendel of Kotzk. At first, R. Avraham Moshe refused the position to avoid a schism in the community, but after much pressure from his father's followers he agreed. Ultimately R. Avraham Moshe's died only two year later during the seventh night of Hanukkah in 1828 in the town of Biała Rawska (where he is buried), on his way from Warsaw to Przysucha. After his death, his followers adopted R. Israel Yitzhak Kalish as R. Avraham Moshe's successor, who chiefly incorporated his new followers into Vurka Hasidism. R. Avraham Moshe had two children who were orphaned at a young age and partially raised by R. Israel Yitzhak Kalish. R. Avraham Moshe's eldest son, R. Tzvi Hersh Mordechai Bonhardt headed his own Hasidic court in Przysucha and married Tziporah Kalish, daughter of R. Israel Yitzhak Kalish. R. Avraham Moshe's daughter, Sarah Hadas Bonhardt married Fischel Heller of Makov, a maternal grandson of R. Nosson Nuta of Makov (son-in-law of R. Chaim Chaykl of Amdur).
