= Simcha Bunim of Peshischa =

Second Grand Rabbi Peshischa and a key personality in the Polish Hasidic movement

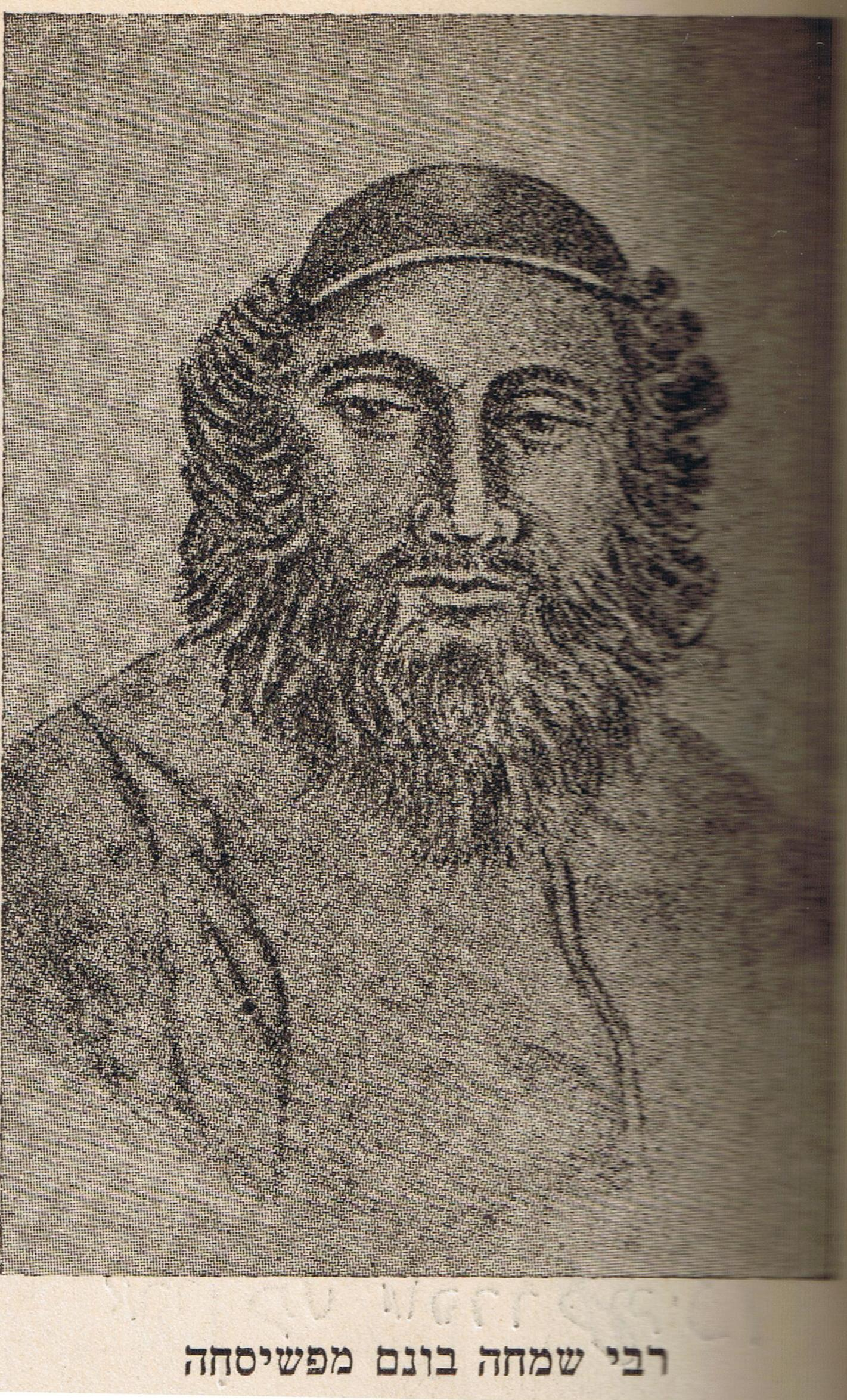
- Bunim ca. 1824
- Title: Rebbe Reb Bunim (רבי ר׳בונם)

Personal life
- Born: Simcha Bunim Bonhardt c. 1765 Wodzisław, Polish–Lithuanian Commonwealth
- Died: 4 September 1827 (aged 61–62) Przysucha, Congress Poland
- Buried: Przysucha, Poland
- Spouse: Rebeccah Auvergir-Kogov
- Children: Avraham Moshe of Peshischa, Liba Bonhardt, Beyla Bonhardt.
- Parents: Tzvi Hersh Bonhardt (father); Sarah Rachel (mother)
- Occupation: Apothecary
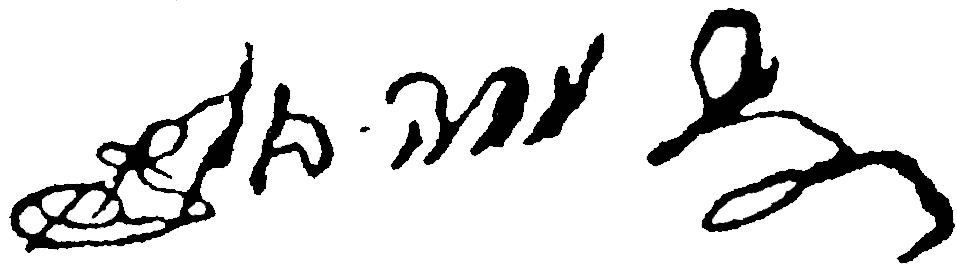
- Signature

Religious life
- Religion: Judaism

Jewish leader
- Predecessor: Yaakov Yitzchak Rabinowicz of Peshischa
- Successor: Avraham Moshe of Peshischa Menachem Mendel Morgensztern of Kotzk
- Began: 1813
- Ended: 1827
- Yahrtzeit: 12 Elul

Simcha Bunim Bonhardt of Peshischa (Note: Simcha Bunim (Simhah Bunem) is also commonly referred to as the "Tzadik of Peshischa", the "Admor of Peshischa" or the "Peshischer Rebbe". In official Polish government records from Przysucha, his name is misspelt as "Szymon Bonchard". Przysucha is also sometimes spelt "פשיסחא" in Yiddish and Hebrew.) (Yiddish: שמחה בונם בונהרט פון פשיסכע, [ˈsɪmχə ˈbʊnɪm ˈbʊnhaʁt ˈfʊn ˈpʒɪsχə]; c. 1765 – 4 September 1827) also known as the Rebbe Reb Bunim was the second Grand Rabbi of Peshischa (Przysucha, Poland) as well as one of the key leaders of Hasidic Judaism in Poland. The main disciple of Yaakov Yitzchak Rabinowicz ("the Yid Ha-Kadosh"), from 1813 to 1827, he led the Peshischa movement of Hasidic thought, in which he revolutionized 19th-century Hasidic philosophy by juxtaposing the rationalistic pietism of German-Jewry with the spiritual nature of God defined by the Hasidic movement.

Bunim was instrumental in challenging the Hasidic status quo, in which he paired enlightenment philosophy with traditional Orthodox Judaism while controversially emphasizing the importance of the individual in regard to one's personal relationship with God. He outwardly challenged the dynastic and autocratic nature of Hasidic rebbes and encouraged the democratization of Judaism, which led to several unsuccessful attempts by the Hasidic leadership to excommunicate him. Above all else, he believed that authenticity and self-honesty were the foundation of true piety and that the pursuance of authenticity should always usurp the status quo. His teachings are foundational for Kotzk, Ger, Amshinov, Zychlin Hasidism, Aleksander, Vurka, Sochatchov, Radzymin, Lublin, Strikov, Lelov, Kuzmir Hasidism and Izhbitza-Radzin Hasidism. Because of his widespread influence on Polish Hasidism, many consider Simcha Bunim to be one of the most important Jewish philosophers of the Napoleonic era.

== Early life ==
=== Early life and family ===
Simcha Bunim Bonhardt was born in Wodzisław, Poland in either 1765 or 1767, to a non-Hasidic German-Jewish family. His father, Tsvi Hirsh Bonhardt, was a German-born rabbi who became a leading maggid (preacher) in Poland. His collected sermons, Eretz Tzvi received widespread recognition in Poland, even bearing an approbation from the famous Yechezkel Landau. Tzvi was known to have been very familiar with medieval Jewish philosophy and would often emphasize a clear intellectual and textual understanding of rabbinic literature (peshat). Thus, many of Simcha Bunim's rationalistic ideals were greatly influenced by his father, who could be considered traditional rational pietist. Simcha Bunim's mother, Sarah Rachel was the scion of a distinguished Ukrainian rabbinic family. Her father, Betzalel HaLevi of Zhovkva was a renowned Ukrainian rabbi known for his progressive halachic views. Through her father, Sarah Rachel was a descendant of the liberal halakhist, Joel Sirkis and through her mother, she was a descendant of Moses ben Isaac Bonems, the son-in-law of Shmuel Eidels and the great-grandson of the eminent posek Moses Isserles, who in part was a descendant of the medieval Tosafist, Rashi. Hasidic literature recalls that Simcha Bunim had a sister who was physically disabled, who was later healed by Dovid Biderman.

Simcha Bunim's childhood was defined by traditional Jewish values juxtaposed with the secular German cultural orbit. His father moved to Poland for financial reasons, yet he was known to have fervently held on to his German identity, often giving his sermons in German and dressing in modern German clothing. This ultimately had a significant effect on Simcha Bunim and was later used by his opponents, who portrayed him as an outsider because of his Germanic upbringing. Despite this, Simcha Bunim's father, though not Hasidic, was friends with many early Hasidic masters, such as Yisroel Hopstein and David of Lelov. He once received six rubles from Yaakov Yitzchak of Lublin after he gave his insights on a verse in the Book of Isaiah in Yaakov Yitzchak's court in Lublin.

Hasidic literature describes an intimate and loving relationship between Simcha Bunim and his father, partially motivated by the fact that Simcha Bunim was considered to have been an Illui (child prodigy). At age five, he reportedly expounded on the laws of hachnasat orchim (hospitality) before several of his father's guests. When he was ten, he began studying at his local cheder, where he ultimately got into an altercation with the melamed who forced Simcha Bunim to leave the cheder. Following this, Simcha Bunim began privately learning Bava Kamma under a certain "Abba", who was a teacher in the Wodzisław beth midrash. At age fourteen, his father sent him to Mattersburg, Austria, to learn at the yeshiva of Jeremiah Mattersdorf, who had been his father's teacher several years before. In Mattersburg, Simcha Bunim learned alongside Aaron Chorin, who later pioneered Reform Judaism. After spending some nine years in Mattersburg, Simcha Bunim briefly lived in Nikolsburg, now in the Czech Republic, where he learned under Mordecai Benet. After his studies, he returned to Poland, where he married Rebeccah Auvergir-Kogov (Note: Rabbi Dr. Michael Rosen records her surname as "Auvergir-Kogov", while Dr. Glenn Dynner records her surname as "Orverger-Kazov". In Hebrew biographies, her surname is often recorded as "אוברגר–כ׳׳ץ" and Polish biographies record her surname as "Ohrwerger".) (1776–1858), the daughter of the wealthy merchant, Moshe Auvergir-Kogov in 1791 in Będzin. Over a year or so, Simcha Bunim stayed in the home of his father-in-law, where he began to privately study Hasidic philosophy with Moshe Leib of Sassov, and Yisroel of Kozhnitz.

=== Court of the Seer ===
After staying with his father-in-law for a year or so, Simcha Bunim and his wife left Będzin and moved in with a certain Kalman, who managed the Kosher Meat Tax in Siedlce. Simcha Bunim worked as his bookkeeper, and during his time in Siedlce, Simcha Bunim often engaged in Kiruv, attempting to connect with assimilated Jews. After working in Siedlce for about a year, David of Lelov, convinced Simcha Bunim that he should travel to Lublin to learn under Yaakov Yitzchak Horowitz ("the Seer of Lublin"). When Simcha Bunim arrived in Lublin, he was soon taken under the wing of Yaakov Yitzchak Rabinowicz ("the Yid Ha-Kadosh"), who the Seer delegated to take in new young students in Lublin. Simcha Bunim later admitted to his followers that when he first met the Seer of Lublin, he could not understand him or his ideology. In the eyes of the Seer, the role of the tzadik was limited to a select few individuals who were metaphysically different from the rest of humanity. The Seer believed that because the tzadik was metaphysically different, he thus had the right to exercise enormous control and autocracy over his followers, as they would seemingly not be able to connect with God unless they put their faith entirely in the tzadik. The Yid Ha-Kadosh, the Seer's principal disciple, was of an altogether different school of thought, which exceedingly came into conflict with the Seer as the Yid Ha-Kadosh took on more followers. This conflict erupted around 1793 when the Yid Ha-Kadosh officially left the court of the Seer alongside his disciples to establish his own Hasidic movement in Przysucha. The Yid Ha-Kadosh, unlike the Seer, believed that the role of the tzadik was not that of the impetus of God but rather as a teacher who was never to usurp the individuality of his students. It was this fundamental basis from which the Peshischa movement was based and which later put it into direct conflict with the Hasidic establishment.

=== Pharmacy in Przysucha ===
When Simcha Bunim arrived in Przysucha with the Yid Ha-Kadosh, he was employed by the wealthy businesswoman Temerl Bergson, who he had met through Yisroel of Kozhnitz. She would often send Simcha Bunim to represent her timber firm at the annual trading fairs in Danzig, Leipzig, and Frankfurt an der Oder. When in these places, Simcha Bunim would often engage in Kiruv with assimilated German Jews, famously attending the theatre and playing games of chess in order to connect with assimilated Jews, hundreds of whom he reportedly brought back into Orthodoxy. After working for Temerl Bergson for several years, Simcha Bunim became increasingly bothered with the amount of long-distance travelling his job required of him and instead chose to establish himself in Przysucha long-term so that he could have more time to personally learn under the Yid Ha-Kadosh. Simcha Bunim taught himself pharmacology and natural science and he eventually received his apothecary diploma after passing an exam before a board of doctors in Lviv. During the Napoleonic Wars, he garnered attention for his pharmaceutical excellence and personally served as an apothecary to several distinguished army commanders and Polish nobles. After the Yid Ha-Kadosh's death in 1813, Simcha Bunim became his successor rather than his son, Yerachmiel Rabinowicz. Simcha Bunim at first was hesitant about taking up such a stressful position of leadership, but after much pressure from the Hasidim of Peshischa, he succeeded the Yid Ha-Kadosh.

== Rabbinical position ==
Simcha Bunim was an atypical Hasidic leader, after succeeding the Yid Ha-Kadosh, Simcha Bunim brought Peshischa to its highest point and kickstarted a counter-revolutionary movement which challenged the Hasidic norm. While under the Yid Ha-Kadosh, Peshischa was closer to a philosophy whereas, under Simcha Bunim it was transformed into a religious movement. Under Simcha Bunim's leadership, centres were created across Poland that held an ideological alliance with Peshischa. These centres preached Simcha Bunim's ideals of rationalism, radical personhood, independence and the constant quest for authenticity.

=== Torah ===
The Hasidic movement believed that one's connection to God derived from their heart and soul, while the Misnagdim believed that one needed to engage in intensive intellectual study of Rabbinic literature in order to connect to God. Simcha Bunim, though Hasidic favoured the latter approach, and outwardly criticized the mystical, ascetic miracle-centric nature of Hasidism, and instead encouraged disciples to learn Gemara, Tosafot, and the works of the Rambam and the Maharal of Prague. He believed that his disciples should be erudite in rabbinic literature in order to compete for rabbinic posts. Yet despite this value of learning, Simcha Bunim believed that learning Torah on its own was inadequate and that Torah learning was an intermediary which had to be juxtaposed to personal introspection in order to truly connect with God and that one had to connect on a personal level to the Torah. While Kabbalah and contemporary Hasidism attempted to only understand the Divine, Simcha Bunim believed that all individuals must develop a sense of being and personhood in the presence of the Divine. The emphasis was not on trying to understand God, but on trying to understand the human being. Simcha Bunim saw that the ultimate purpose of the Torah and the mitzvoth is to draw a person close to God, through an approach that can only be achieved with humility and joy, and that a critical and intellectual interpretation of the Torah is crucial for enlightenment. He thus concluded that the service of God demanded both passion and analytical study.

=== Authenticity ===
Simcha Bunim held that self-authenticity was a foundational principle of spiritual success. He adamantly believed that one could not stand with any sense of integrity before God unless one first had some clarity of who one really was. Contemporary Hasidic leaders saw his emphasis on individualism as a form of Hedonism, while Simcha Bunim insisted that, for one to fulfil the Mitzvot, they must first work on themselves, and that by working to better one's self, one fulfils a major mitzvah, in his own right. He believed that the pursuance of authenticity should usurp the status quo, and only those who have developed an understanding of themselves can begin to pursue personal authenticity. He taught that all actions have to be done with sincerity in a state of personal truthfulness and that performing a mitzvah for the sake of personal interest or for the sake of conformity, results in the mitzvah having less weight. He believed that emotional and physical preparation for prayer is crucial for one to be able to fulfil the mitzvoth authentically and that personal analysis and self-honesty are integral for this process, which should be prioritized over halakhic restrictions of time.

=== Nature ===
Simcha Bunim believed that nature and Torah were aligned and thus, by looking into one's own nature, man can discover Torah and truth. The connection between human nature and the Torah was central to Peshischa's doctrine. According to Simcha Bunim, once a person discovers the essence of his core being, then he is able to see truth reflected in God's design in nature. He further believed, that since Torah is also truth, then by making contact with the truth of one's being, one can make contact with the as-yet unstated, uncommanded Torah. Simcha Bunim concluded that Torah is not something artificially imposed on human nature, but it, in fact, its real nature. Unlike contemporary Hasidic figures who believed that humanity's role was to escape the world as an ascetic, Simcha Bunim believed that it was instead to connect with the Divine so as to bring it into this world.

=== Sin ===
Simcha Bunim viewed sin as something which wasn't demonic, but rather a part of human nature, which one should not dwell too much on. He encouraged his disciples to reflect on their sins and improve on themselves, but he warned about dwelling on sin, which he believed to be detrimental to the process of personal growth.

=== Introspection ===
Simcha Bunim constantly encouraged his disciples to do deep personal introspection and find the root of their motives and intentions. If one had inauthentic intentions that were motivated by pretences, they had to purify their motives through a process of self-reflection, self-analysis and prayer. Simcha Bunim was deeply engaged with the psychology of the soul and the importance of self-awareness in regard to one's own practices and beliefs. He taught that one could only achieve enlightenment if they were open and honest about their motives and had pure intentions that were based on spiritual growth.

=== Religion ===
Simcha Bunim believed that religion was not simply an act of adopting a system of beliefs, but that tests and trials were needed, and one had to ascertain through introspection whether one's beliefs were genuine or not and whether one acted out the truth or lived a life of pretence. He encouraged questioning and reflection and he was not afraid of doubts of deliberations that might lead one astray. Simcha Bunim believed that a person must not search for the truth by imitating another, however pious, but rather by going inside his inner being. He believed that those whose piety was motivated by what others think or say were unable to develop a real connection to God. Controversially, he told his disciples that they may ignore restrictions of time during prayer if it directly impedes them from connecting to prayer. He didn't fast on the Fast of Gedalia and other minor fast days, as he believed that they provided no benefit to one's spiritual growth.

=== Tzadik ===
Simcha Bunim was adamantly against the autocratic nature which had defined the Hasidic leadership of his time and he encouraged his students, to think critically and to be independent of him. He believed the role of the rebbe was that of a teacher who helped his disciples develop their own sense of autonomy and not of an enforcer or impetus of God. Those students who were unable to accept responsibility for themselves were considered unfit to be part of Peshischa. He believed that no rebbe or tzadik could usurp the role of the individual and that those who did were motivated by self-aggrandizement. Simcha Bunim taught that each individual must assume personal responsibility for standing before the Divine presence, and that a rebbe cannot absolve a person from personal responsibility or finding his own path. Simcha Bunim criticized the institutions of dynasty in Hasidism, stating that any movement, which elects its rebbe based on pedigree rather than merit is bound to encounter issues. These fundamental beliefs directly attacked the Hasidic status quo who became increasingly uncomfortable with the growth of the Peshischa movement, which often limited their power as rebbes, instead promoting an individualistic approach to Judaism.

=== Reaction against Peshischa ===
In 1822, at the wedding of the grandson of Avraham Yehoshua Heshel in Ustyluh, Ukraine, an attempt was made by the majority of the Hasidic leaders of Poland and Galicia to excommunicate Simcha Bunim. Several dignitaries such as Tzvi Hirsh of Zidichov, Naftali Zvi of Ropshitz, Meir Rotenberg and Moshe Hopstein came to the wedding to publicly speak out against Simcha Bunim, in hopes that Avraham Heshel along with other leading rabbis, would agree to excommunicate Simcha Bunim and the Peshischa movement. Knowing that he would be slandered, Simcha Bunim sent his top students, mainly Menachem Mendel of Kotzk, Yitzchak Meir Alter, Yaakov Aryeh Guterman, Shraga Fayvel Dancyger and Yisroel Yitzchak Kalish. Originally, Simcha Bunim wished to go himself to defend his movement, however, his students advised him, that his appearance would be too controversial. During the course of the festivities, a public debate was held in which combatants of Peshischa appealed to Avraham Heshel to decide whether to ban Peshischa or not. They described Peshischa as a movement of radical intellectual pietists and non-conformists who endangered the Hasidic establishment. They also criticized Simcha Bunim for dressing in contemporary German fashion as opposed to the traditional Hasidic garb, claiming that his German pedigree debarred him from being an adequate Hassidic leader. His critics mockingly called him "der deutschle" (lit. 'the little German'), which he is still sometimes referred to in communities like Bobov who often bind works relating to Simcha Bunim. Nearing the end of the debate, Avraham Heshel turned towards Yerachmiel Rabinowicz, the son of the Yid Ha-Kadosh, and asked him what he thought of Simcha Bunim. Yerachmiel responded in approbation towards Simcha Bunim, and thus Avraham Heshel ended the debate. Ultimately no negative came out of this event, but quite the opposite occurred, following the intense debates at the wedding, hundreds of young Hasids flocked to Peshischa, after hearing of the enlightened and unconventional approach of Simcha Bunim.

=== Involvement in Polish politics ===
Nearing the end of his life, Simcha Bunim became involved in the politics of Polish Jewry, being elected in 1825 as a representative of the Sandomierz Province as a member of the government commission on Jewish affairs. He was strongly opposed to the committee's agenda and fought against it, as he believed that the Jewish communities of Poland should be left to their own devices. In his last years, Simcha Bunim went blind, most likely from cataracts. Besides Hasidism Simcha Bunim's teachings also influenced early Zionist thinkers such as Martin Buber.

== Legacy ==
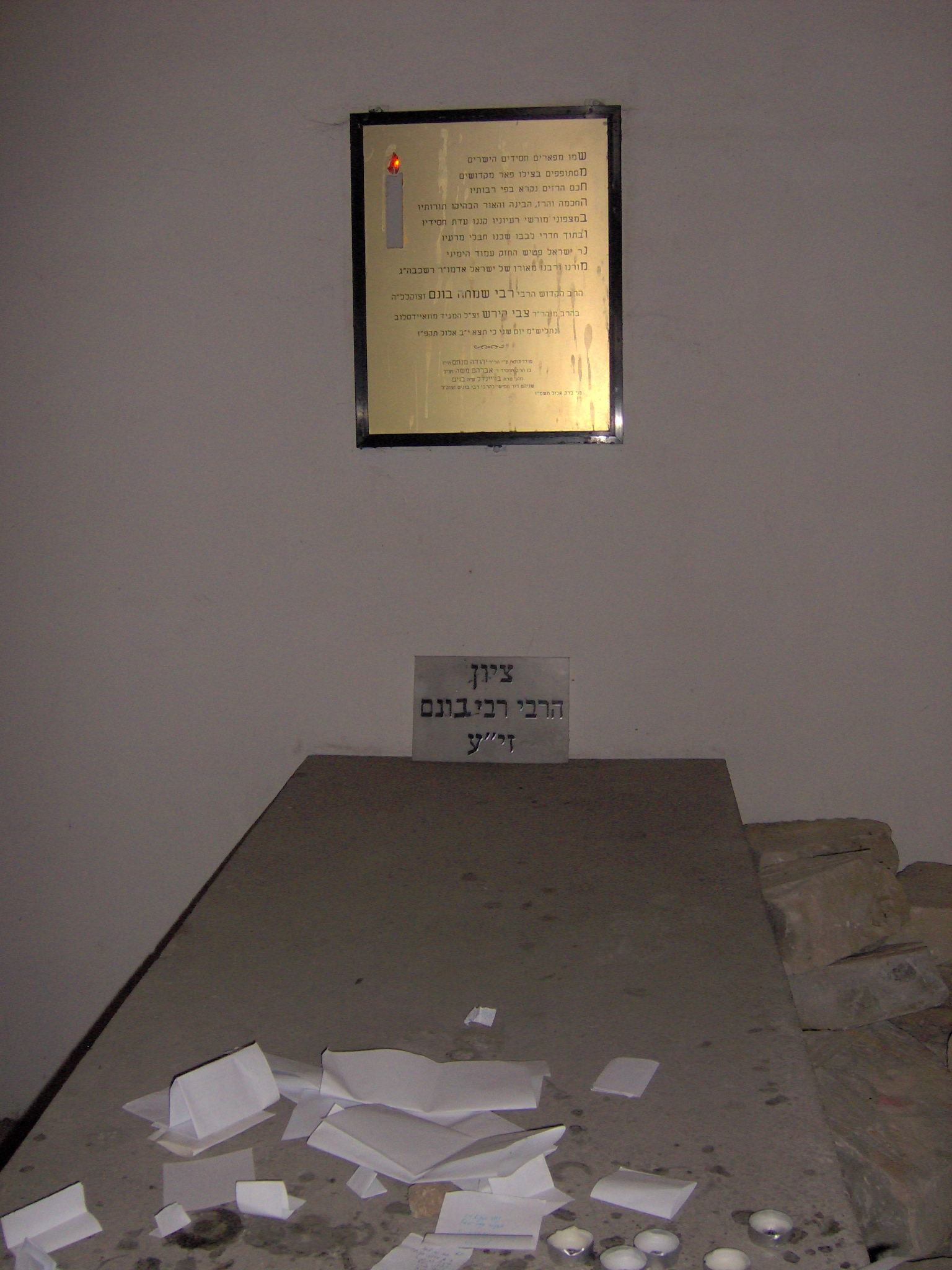
Gravesite of Simcha Bunim in Przysucha, Poland

After Simcha Bunim's death in 1827, Peshischa split into two factions, those who supported Menachem Mendel of Kotzk as Simcha Bunim's successor and those who supported Simcha Bunim's son, Avraham Moshe. Generally speaking, those who supported Menachem Mendel such as Yitzchak Meir Alter and Mordechai Yosef Leiner, were the more radical of Simcha Bunim's followers who argued that Simcha Bunim was adamantly against Hasidic dynasties and never wanted his son to succeed him. On the other hand, those who supported Simcha Bunim's son, such as Israel Yitzhak Kalish, Yaakov Aryeh Guterman and Shraga Fayvel Dancyger, were the less radical of Simcha Bunim's followers who were turned off by the intense and fierce demeanour of Menachem Mendel of Kotzk. Originally Simcha Bunim's son never wanted to succeed his father, however, after much pressure from the community, he took over as the leader of the divided Peshischa community, dying only two years later in 1829. After his death, Israel Yitzhak Kalish took Avraham Moshe's fraction of the community and gradually incorporated them into his own Hasidic dynasty based in Warka. Menachem Mendel of Kotzk did the same, incorporating his fraction of the community into his own Hasidic dynasty based in Kock. Even though Peshischa ceased to exist as a separate movement, its ideals still exist as the foundation for a large percentage of modern Hasidic groups.

=== Disciples ===
Among Simcha Bunim's disciples were;

- Menachem Mendel Morgenztern, founder of Kotzk Hasidism.
- Yitzchak Meir Alter, founder of Ger Hasidism.
- Mordechai Yosef Leiner, founder of Izhbitza-Radzin Hasidism.
- Israel Yitzhak Kalish, founder of Vurka Hasidism.
- Yaakov Aryeh Guterman, founder of Radzymin Hasidism.
- Shraga Fayvel Dancyger, progenitor of Aleksander Hasidism.
- Shmuel Abba Zychlinski, founder of Zychlin Hasidism.
- Yechezkel Taub, founder of Kuzmir Hasidism.
- Moshe Biderman, second Lelover Rebbe.
- Nosson Nuta Makover, Makover Rebbe.
- Chanokh Heynekh HaKohen Levin, second Gerrer Rebbe.
- Meir of Kovel
- Shmuel of Sieniawa, publisher of Ramataim Zofim.
- Alexander Zusha, the Av Beis Din of Plotzk publisher of Kol Simcha.

=== Children and descendants ===
Simcha Bunim and his wife Rebeccah had three children;

- Avraham Moshe Bonhardt – He succeeded his father as Peshischa Rebbe but died two years later. He married Braindel Raphael's, daughter of Shmuel Raphael's, son-in-law of the Yid Ha-Kadosh. The couple had two children;
  - Tzvi Hersh Mordechai Bonhardt – He served as Hasidic rabbi in Przysucha and married Tziporah Kalish, the daughter of Israel Yitzhak Kalish of Vukra.
  - Sarah Hadas Bonhardt – She married Fischel Heller of Makov, the maternal grandson of Nosson of Makov.
- Leeba – She married Levi Yitzchak Dancyger, son of Shraga Fayvel Dancyger, who died young without any children.
- Beila – She married Elimelech Esteraycher, stepson of Zvi Hersh Grynwald of Opoczna. The couple had one son and two daughters;
  - Yitzhak Simcha Esteraycher (Reb Itchile) – He married Devorah Gitla Morgensztern, daughter of Dovid Morgensztern, the second Kotzker Rebbe.
  - Rivka Esteraycher – She married Yitzhak Simcha Bunim Rosenbaum.
  - Chana Esteraycher – She married Moshe Dyzenhaus of Slupia.

== Works ==
Simcha Bunim did not publish his writings because he felt that the static written word would fossilize his teachings and hinder the quest for personal authenticity. Yet many of his teachings were transmitted orally and published, much later on after his death. The following are collections of Simcha Bunim's oral teachings:

- Kol Simcha (קול שמחה) – Published by Simcha Bunim's disciple, Rabbi Alexander Zusha in 1859 in Breslau. Later being published again in 1877 in Przemysl. The work is a collection of Simcha Bunim's oral commentaries on the Torah and Talmud.
- Ramataim Zofim (רמתיים צופים) – Published by Simcha Bunim's personal scribe, Shmuel of Sieniawa in 1882 in Warsaw. The work is a general collection of oral teachings from Hasidic masters, with Simcha Bunim being mentioned several times.
- Simchat Yisrael (שמחת ישראל) – Published in 1910 in Piotrkow, the work recalls oral commentaries of Simcha Bunim.
- Midrash Simcha I and Midrash Simcha II (מדרש שמחה) – Published in 1975 in Jerusalem, the work recounts oral Midrashim given by Simcha Bunim.
