= Shmuel of Karov =

Polish Hasidic rebbe

Personal life
- Born: Shmuel ben Avraham Yeshayahu c. 1735 Prudnik, Poland
- Died: 1820 Kurów, Poland
- Children: Reb Dovid of Karov, Reb Shlomo of Karov
- Parent: Avraham Yeshayahu ben David Shmuel (father)

Religious life
- Religion: Judaism

Reb Shmuel ben Avraham Yeshayahu of Karov (Hebrew: שמואל בן אברהם ישעיהו מקארוב; c. 1735 - 1820) was a late 18th-century Polish Hasidic rebbe who was a leading disciple of both Elimelech of Lizhensk and Yaakov Yitzchak of Lublin.

== Biography ==
Born in Prudnik, Poland around 1735. His father Avraham Yeshayahu ben David Shmuel was the grandson of Judah Leib ben Isaac and thus the great-great-grandson of Joshua Höschel ben Joseph. Despite his illustrious pedigree, he grew up in immense poverty, to the point where the community needed to support him during the Jewish holidays. In his early years, Reb Shmuel became a disciple of Elimelech of Lizhensk later traveling to Lublin, where he became one of the main disciples of Yaakov Yitzchak of Lublin who helped Reb Shmuel to head a small yeshiva in Lublin. In 1815, Reb Shmuel became the head of his own Hasidic court in Kurów, which received thousands of young Hasidim from surrounding areas. Among his most notable followers were Natan of Makova and Yechezkel Taub, who founded Kuzmir Hasidism. After his death, his eldest son, Reb Dovid refused to succeed him as head of the court in Kurów and thus he majority of his followers travelled to Simcha Bunim of Peshischa. Several of Reb Shmuel's teaching were collected in "Shir La'Chasidim" published in 1930 in Warsaw.
