= Amshinov =

Hasidic dynasty

Amshinov Hasidic Dynasty
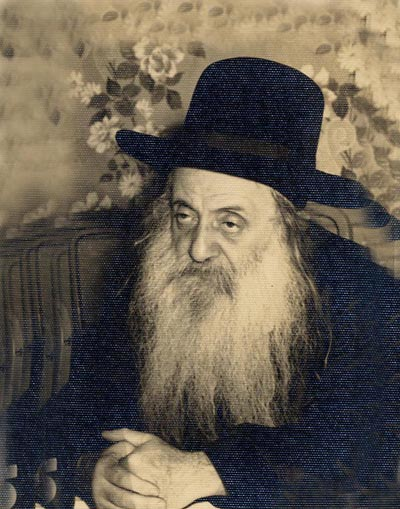
- Rabbi Shimon Sholom Kalish

Founder
- Yaakov Dovid Kalish

Regions with significant populations
- Israel, United States, Poland, Belgium

Religions
- Hasidic Judaism

Related ethnic groups
- Vurka, Peshischa

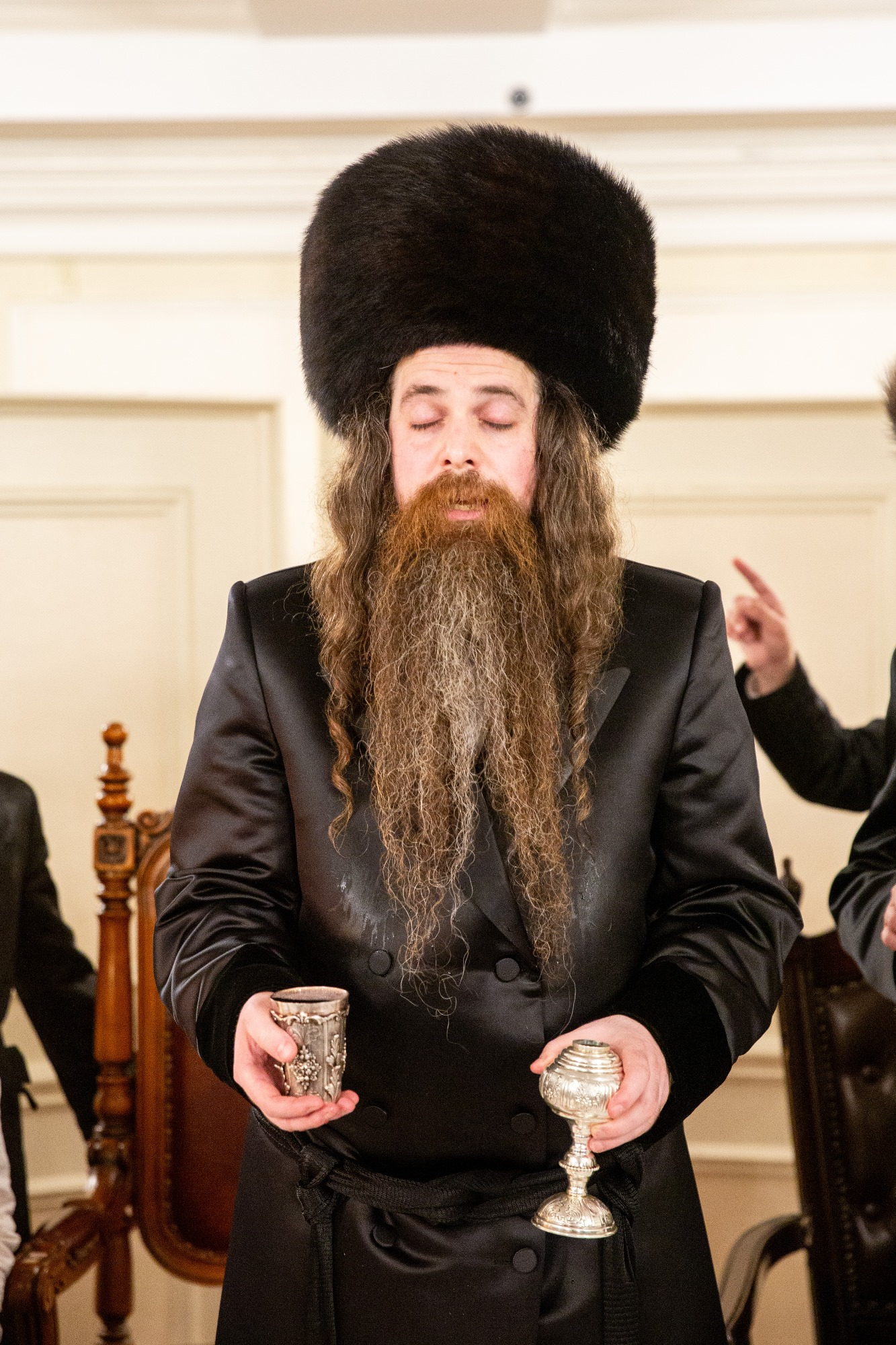
Rabbi Menachem Kalish, Amshinover rebbe of Boro Park

Amshinov (Yiddish: אמשינאוו) is a dynasty of Hasidic Judaism founded in the town of Mszczonów, Poland, called "Amshinov" in Yiddish. It was founded by Yaakov Dovid Kalish, the son of Israel Yitzhak Kalish. Amshinov is a branch of Warka Hasidism, itself a branch of Peshischa Hasidism. This lineage traces back to Simcha Bunim of Peshischa (1765-1827), who was the teacher of Israel Yitzhak Kalish.

== History ==
The first Amshinover rebbe, Yaakov Dovid Kalish, was a son of the first Vurker rebbe, Israel Yitzhak Kalish of Warka (Yiddish: Vurka).

Kalish died in 1878 and was succeeded as Amshinover Rebbe by one of his sons, Menachem Kalish.

When Menachem Kalish died in 1917 his son Yosef became the rebbe in Amshinov, and his other son, Shimon Sholom, became rebbe in Otwock (Yiddish: אטוואצק Otvotsk). He was involved in the exodus of thousands of young men in Kletzk, Radin, Novhardok, and other yeshivas via Japan to Shanghai at the outbreak of World War II. By the time Shanghai came under Japanese control, it held 26,000 Jews.

Shimon Sholom's son Yerachmiel Yehuda Myer Kalish (1901–1976) of Amshinov, was born in Przysucha (Yiddish: פּשיסכע Pshiskhe), Poland. He studied Torah with his grandfather, Menachem Kalish.

After the war, Shimon moved to the United States. Upon his death in 1954 (י"ט אב תשי"ד), his son accompanied his body to Tiberias in Israel, and remained in Israel, later moving to Tel Aviv, and then to the Bayit Vegan neighbourhood of Jerusalem.

== 21st century rebbes ==
=== Jerusalem ===
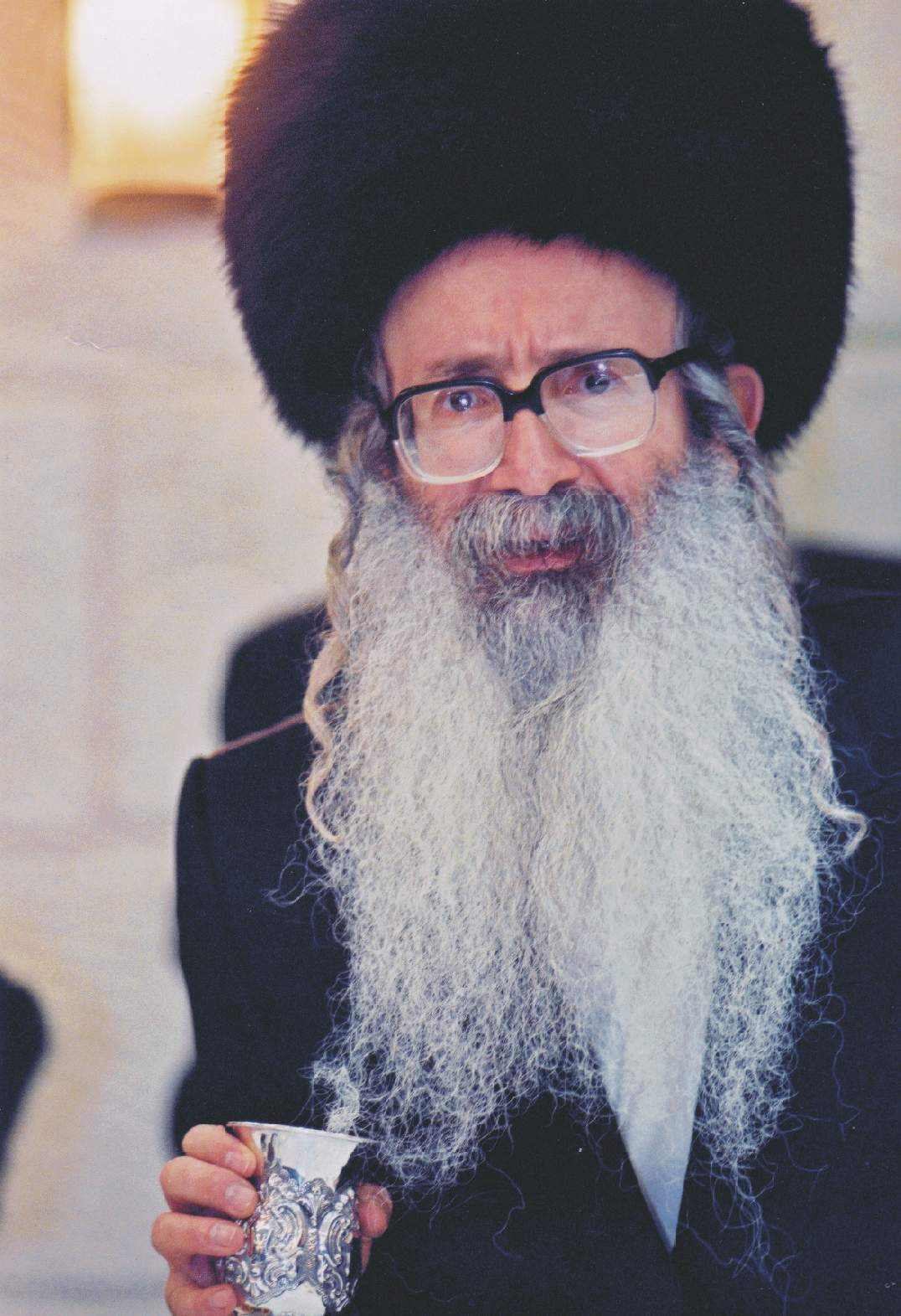
Rabbi Yaakov Aryeh Yeshaya Milikowsky

Yaakov Aryeh Yeshaya Milikowsky, the Amshinover rebbe in the Bayit Vegan section of Jerusalem, was born in the United States and was named after his ancestor Yaakov Aryeh Guterman of the hasidic dynasty of Radzymin. He is the son of Yerachmiel Yehudah Meir Kalish's daughter Chayah Nechamah and her husband Chaim Milikowsky.

In 2015 he founded an organization called Tzedaka V'chesed Amshinov as a charity in memory of Rabbi Meir Ba'al HaNes.

=== New York ===
Yosef Kalish II was the previous Amshinover rebbe in the Boro Park section of Brooklyn, New York City. He was the son of Yitzchak Kalish, the son of Yosef Kalish. He died on April 5, 2020, at the age of 63, from COVID-19.

His two children succeeded him: the older, Menachem Kalish, became the rebbe in Boro Park and the younger, Osher Chaim Kalish, in Bet Shemesh.

== Lineage of the Amshinov dynasty ==
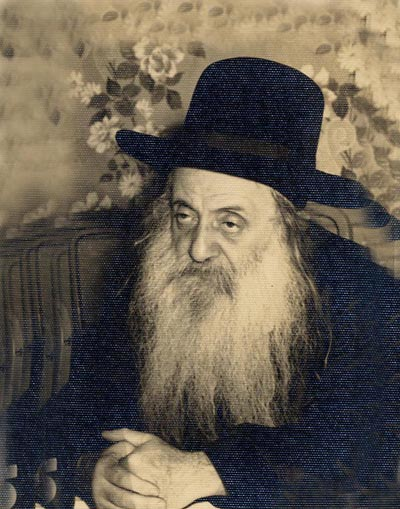
Israel Yitzhak Kalish (1779–1848); Rebbe of Vurka
Yaakov Dovid Kalish I (1814–1878); 1st Rebbe of Amshinov
Menachem Kalish of Amshinov (1860–1918); 2nd Rebbe of Amshinov
Shimon Sholom Kalish (1882–1954); Rebbe of Amshinov-Otvotsk	Yosef Kalish I (d. 1935); Rebbe of Amshinov
Yerachmiel Yehuda Myer Kalish (1901–1976); Rebbe of Amshinov-Otvotsk	Yaakov Dovid Kalish II (1906–1942); Rebbe of Amshinov	Yitzchok Kalish (d. 1993); Rebbe of Amshinov
Chaya Nechama (daughter)	Chaim Milikowsky; Rosh Yeshivah of Amshinov, Jerusalem (did not become Rebbe)	Yosef Kalish II (d. 2020); Amshinover Rebbe of America
Yaakov Aryeh Yeshia Milikowsky; Amshinover Rebbe of Jerusalem	Menachem Kalish; Amshinover Rebbe of Boro Park	Osher Chaim Kalishy; Amshinover Rebbe of Bet Shemesh
