= Vurka (Hasidic dynasty) =

Polish Hasidic dynasty

Vurka Hasidic Dynasty
Founder
- Rabbi Israel Yitzhak Kalish

Regions with significant populations
- Israel, United States, Poland

Religions
- Hasidic Judaism

Languages
- Yiddish, Hebrew

Related ethnic groups
- Peshischa, Aleksander, Amshinov

Vurke (Yiddish: ווארקא) is a Hasidic dynasty originating from the city of Warka, Poland, where it was founded by Israel Yitzhak Kalish (1779–1848). Vurka is a branch of Peshischa Hasidism, as Israel Yitzhak Kalish was a leading disciple of Simcha Bunim of Peshischa (1765–1827). Following Simcha Bunim's death, he led a part of the divided Peschischa community, in Przysucha, later incorporating the community into his own Hasidic dynasty based in Warka.

== History ==
After Simcha Bunim of Peschischa's death in 1827, Peschischa became divided into several different sects led by Menachem Mendel of Kotzk and Avraham Moshe of Peshischa. Originally Kalish supported the secession of Simcha Bunim's son Avraham Moshe, however after his death a year later in 1828, he took over as Avraham Moshe's successor. Kalish moved the majority of the community to Warka, where he established his own Hasidic court. He also established a minor court in Przysucha, which he put Avraham Moshe's son, Tzvi Mordechai of Peshischa in charge of. Israel Yitzhak Kalish’s eldest son Yaakov David (1814–1878) founded the Amshinov Hasidic dynasty, which still exits today in Israel and the United States as the only continuation of Vurka. Following Israel Yitzhak Kalish’s death, a large percentage of his followers accepted Shraga Fayvel Dancyger (the founder of Aleksander Hasidism) as Kalish's successor. Israel Yitzhak Kalish’s younger son, Menaḥem Mendel Kalish (1819–1868) reluctantly became the Vurka rebbe. Menaḥem Mendel’s son and successor Simcha Bunim Kalish (1851–1907) moved the community to Otwock, where he amassed several new followers. In 1905, he suddenly left for the Land of Israel, and was succeeded by his son Menachem Mendel (ca.1870-1918).

== Succession of Vurka ==
- Israel Yitzhak Kalish (1779–1848), First Vurka Rebbe.
  - Yaakov David (1814–1878), founder of the Amshinov Hasidic dynasty.
  - Menachem Mendel Kalish (1819–1868), Second Vurka Rebbe.
    - Simcha Bunim Kalish (1851–1907), Third Vurka Rebbe.
      - Menachem Mendel Kalisz (ca.1870-1918), Fourth Vurka Rebbe

== Offshoots of Vurke ==
- Aleksander
- Amshinov
