= Yaakov Aryeh Guterman =

Polish Rabbi (1792-1874)

Rabbi Yaakov Aryeh Guterman
- Title: Radzyminer Rebbe

Personal life
- Born: 1792 Warka
- Died: July 3, 1874 (aged 81–82)
- Buried: The Warsaw Jewish Cemetery
- Children: Rabbi Shlomo Yehoshua David Guterman, Avraham Chaim Guterman, Yisroel Zvi Guterman
- Parents: Rabbi Shlomo Guterman (father); Bina (mother)
- Dynasty: Radzymin

Religious life
- Religion: Judaism

Jewish leader
- Successor: Rabbi Shlomo Yehoshua David Guterman
- Yahrtzeit: 18 Tammuz (Hebrew month) 5634
- Dynasty: Radzymin

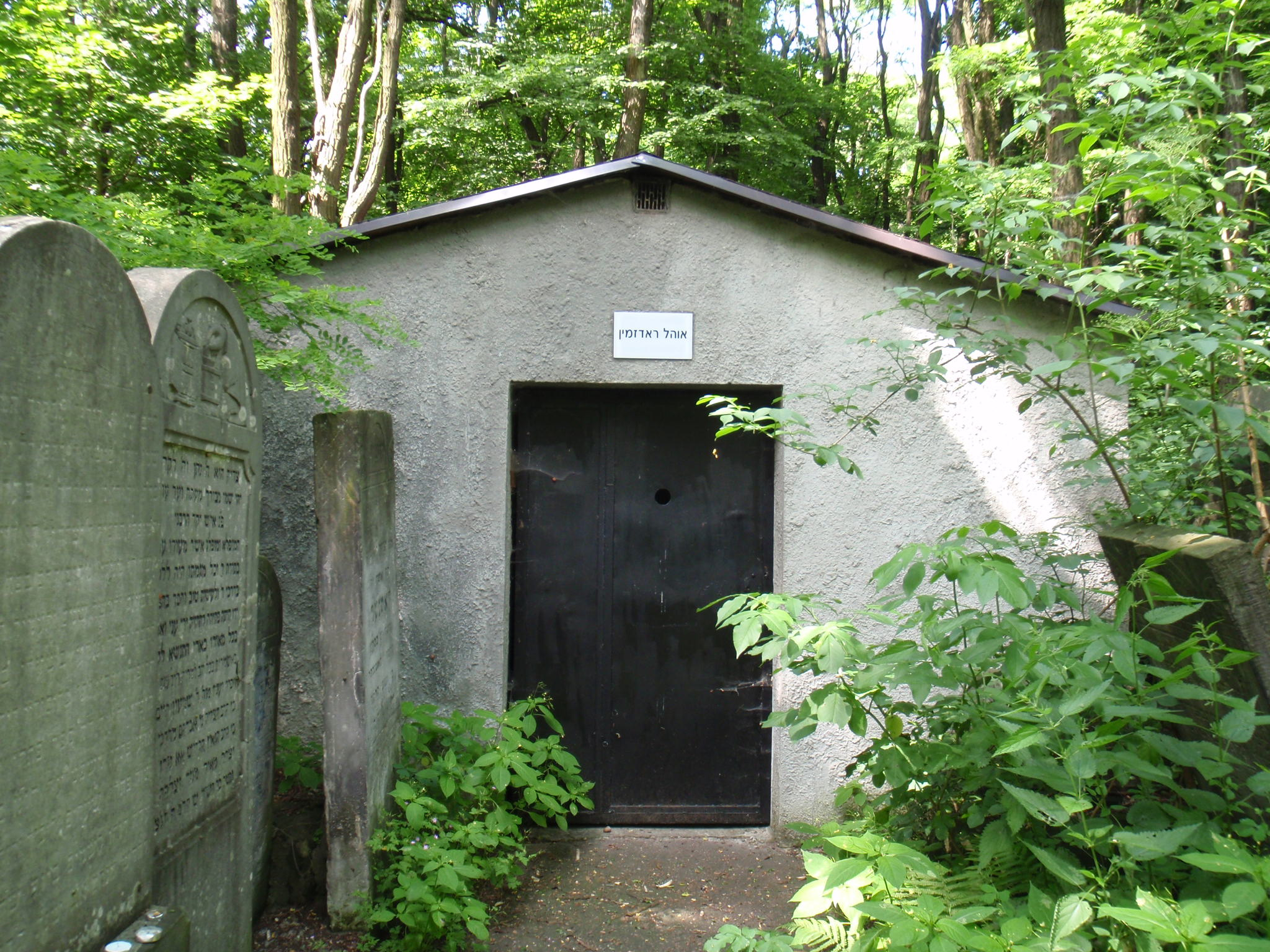
Ohel of Rabbi Yaakov Aryeh Guterman in the Warsaw Jewish Cemetery

Grand Rabbi Yaakov Aryeh Guterman (1792–1874) was the founding admor of the Radzymin Hasidic Dynasty. He was called the "Sabba Kadisha (Holy Grandfather) of Radzymin".

== Biography ==
Guterman was a disciple of the Seer of Lublin, the Maggid of Kozhnitz, the Yid Hakodosh, Rabbi Simcha Bunim of Peshischa and Rabbi Yitzchok of Vurka. In 1848, after the death of Yitzchok of Vurka, Gutterman became the founding admor of the Radzymin Hasidic Dynasty.

== Works ==
- Bikurei Aviv, a commentary on the Torah
- Divrei Aviv a commentary on Genesis Rabbah
- Likutei Aviv

== Notable Descendants Who Were Named After Him ==
- Grand Rabbi Yaakov Aryeh Alter of Ger
- Grand Rabbi Yaakov Aryeh Milikowsky of Amshinov
