= Nosson Nuta of Makov =

19th-century Hungarian Hasidic rebbe

Nosson Nuta of Makov (c. 1765 – 1825) was an early 19th-century Hungarian Hasidic rebbe.

== Biography ==
Rabbi Nosson Nuta of Makov was born in Poland. In his early years, he travelled to Lublin, where he became a disciple of the Chozeh of Lublin. It was under the Chozeh's instruction that he travelled to Kurów, where he became the leading disciple of Rabbi Shmuel of Karov. Around this time, he married the daughter of Rabbi Chaim Chaykl of Amdur, who helped Reb Nosson to establish his own small Hasidic court in Makov. Reb Nosson's daughter married Rabbi Yitzchak Heller of Makov, whose son, Rabbi Fischel Heller married the daughter of Rabbi Avraham Moshe of Peshischa.

== See also ==
Amdur (Hasidic dynasty)
