= Aleksander (Hasidic dynasty) =

Polish Hasidic dynasty

Aleksander Hasidic Dynasty
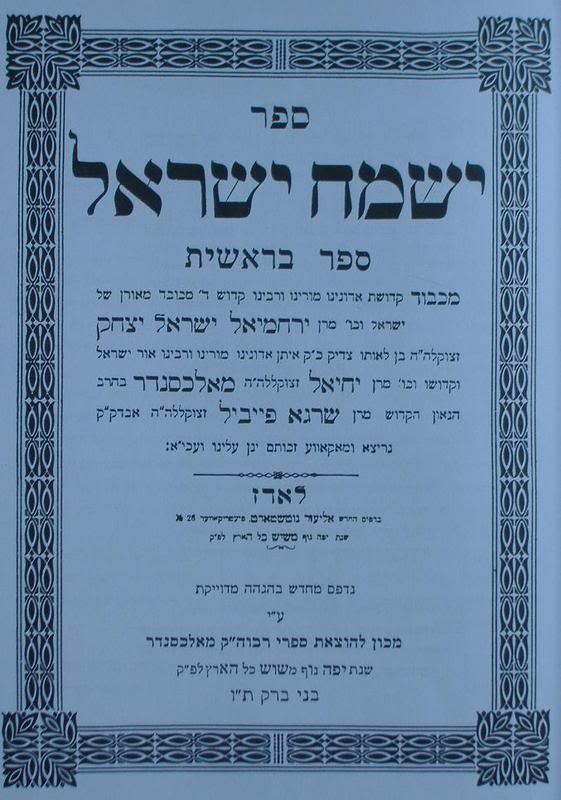
- The title page to Sefer Yismach Yisroel

Founder
- Rabbi Yechiel Dancyger

Regions with significant populations
- Israel, United States, Poland

Religions
- Hasidic Judaism

Languages
- Yiddish, Hebrew

Related ethnic groups
- Vurka, Peshischa

Aleksander (Yiddish: אלעקסאנדער) is a Polish Hasidic dynasty originating from the city of Aleksandrow Lodzki, Poland, where it was founded by Grand Rabbi Yechiel Denciger (1828–1894). Aleksander is a branch of Vurka, as Shraga Fayvel Danciger was a leading disciple of Rabbi Israel Yitzhak Kalish of Vurka. Prior to the Holocaust, Aleksander was the second-largest Hasidic group in Poland. They attracted artisans, merchants and water carriers rather than elite Talmudic scholars and richer people who were attracted to Ger. Like the rest of Polish Jewry, almost all of Aleksander hasidim were murdered in the Holocaust. Between the world wars, Hasidic Jews from all over flocked to the small village of Aleksander to spend the holiest days of the Jewish year in the presence of their spiritual leader, their rebbe, Rabbi Yitzchak Menachem Danciger (1879–1942). The Rebbe of Aleksander attempted to remain neutral in political issues while emphasizing communal prayer and the study of Torah. He was murdered by the Germans on September 5, 1942, eight days before Rosh Hashanah, at Treblinka extermination camp. Today, Aleksander has emerged from the ashes of the Holocaust and continues growing in numbers in small communities in America, Europe and Israel (including a small, but growing community in Melbourne, Australia).

== History ==
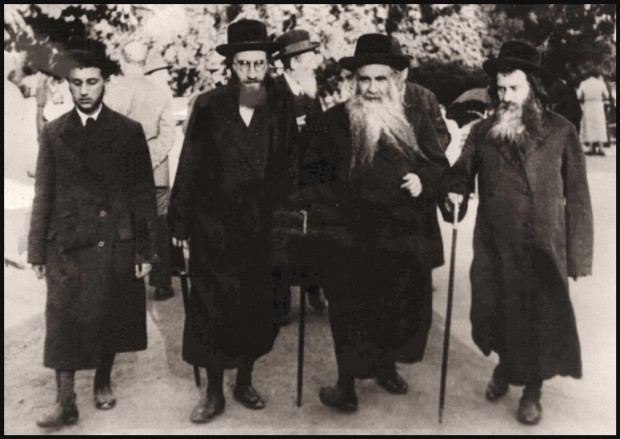
Akeidas Yitzchok walking with his sons and student in Marienbad, 1930s

The founder of the dynasty of Aleksander was Rabbi Yechiel Dancyger (1828–1894), son of Rabbi Fayvl from Gritse, a disciple of Israel Yitzhak Kalish of Vurke.

His son, Yerachmiel Yisroel Yitzchok Dancyger (1853–1910), was even more famous, and accumulated a large group of followers. He was the author of Yismach Yisrael (Hebrew: "Israel will Rejoice", 1911), which he wrote together with his brother, Shmuel Tsvi (1860–1923), who later succeeded him and authored the Tiferes Shmuel. The teachings of the rebbes who followed stressed ethics, mysticism and ecstatic religious forms, putting less emphasis on studying the Talmud.

The followers of the rebbes from Aleksander were primarily merchants and artisans, especially from Warsaw, and also in Łódź, where there were approximately 35 houses of prayer and study. There were also shtiblekh in numerous other towns, including Bełchatów, Opoczno, and Piotrków. In 1914 his brother Betsalel Yoir (1856–1934) began to serve as a rebbe in Łódź, thus starting a second branch of Alexander. After Shmuel Tsvi's death, the dynasty was continued by his son, Yitzchok Menachem Mendel Dancyger (1880–1943), whose accomplishments included the expansion of religious schools in Łódź and in Aleksander. Unlike many chasidic leaders of that period, he was not interested in politics. During the Second World War, he was in the Warsaw Ghetto. Refusing to leave for the Land of Israel, he died along with his family in Treblinka. Nowadays, the community of chasidim of Aleksander exists mainly in Israel, but there are several synagogues (shtiblekh) in Boro Park, Monsey, Lakewood, Cleveland, Antwerp, London, and Zürich.

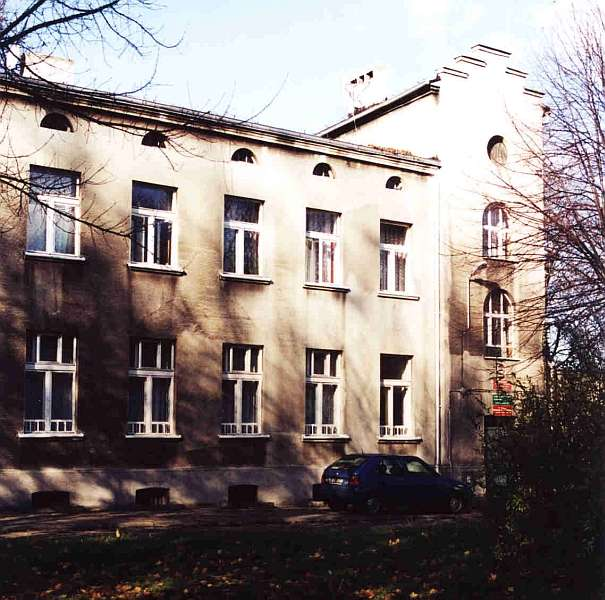
Home of the Aleksander Rebbes in Poland

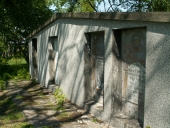
Graves of the Aleksander Rebbes in Poland

== Dynasty ==
- Grand Rabbi Shraga Fayvel Danciger of Gritsa (d. 1848), disciple of Grand Rabbi Israel Yitzhak Kalish of Vurke, served as the rebbe of the Vurke hasidim for the final six months of his life.
  - Grand Rabbi Yechiel Danciger (1828–1894), first rebbe of the Aleksander dynasty, son of Rabbi Shraga Fayvel.
    - Grand Rabbi Yerachmiel Yisroel Yitzchak Danciger (1853–1910), author of Yismach Yisroel, son of Rabbi Yechiel.
    - Grand Rabbi Shmuel Tzvi Danciger (1860–1923), author of Tiferes Shmuel, son of Rabbi Yechiel.
      - Grand Rabbi Yitzchak Menachem Mendel Danciger (1880–1943), author of Akeidas Yitzchok, son of the Tiferes Shmuel, murdered in Treblinka along with his family.
    - Grand Rabbi Betzalel Yoir Danciger of Łódź (1856–1934), son of Rabbi Yechiel.
      - Grand Rabbi Yehudah Moshe Dancyger (1892–1973), author of Emunas Moshe, son-in-law of Rabbi Betzalel Yoir, Became Rebbe of Aleksander following the Second World War.
        - Grand Rabbi Avrohom Menachem Danciger (1921–2005), the Imrei Menachem, son of the Emunas Moshe.
          - Grand Rabbi Yisroel Zvi Yair Danciger oldest son of the Imrei Menachem, is the current Aleksander Rebbe.
          - Grand Rabbi Shneur Zalman Danciger a younger son of the Imrei Menachem, is the current Aleksander Rebbe in Cleveland, Ohio.

== Aleksander Hasidism today ==
After the destruction of European Jewry, the surviving remnant of Aleksander Hassidim asked Rabbi Yehuda Moshe to assume the leadership. He was a prolific writer and published a number of works, including Responsa Hashava Letava (Lodz, 1933) and another volume that contained two works: Kedushat Yitzhak and Nahalat Zvi (Jerusalem, 1952)—the former on the hasidic masters who precipitated Aleksander Hassidism, and the latter as commentary on the weekly Torah portion. Rabbi Yehuda Moshe also spoke to survivors and collated their recollections of pre-war Aleksanderism in Meoran Shel Yisrael (Bnei Brak, 1971). His main collection of thoughts on the Torah and the festivals was published posthumously under the title Emunat Moshe (Bnei Brak, 1976–1991).

Rabbi Yehuda Moshe was succeeded by his son Rabbi Avraham Menahem Dancyger (1921–2005), whose hasidic insights are currently being printed under the title Imrei Menahem. Over the tenure of his thirty two years as Rebbe, R' Avraham Menachem expanded the Aleksander community in four countries, and built a seven-story yeshiva in the Slabodka neighborhood of Bnei Brak Israel. The yeshiva was the rebbes pride and joy, demonstrating a revival of the Aleksander Yeshiva system destroyed in the Holocaust. He died in 2005 shortly following the holiday of Purim.

The eldest son, Rabbi Yisroel Zvi Yoir Dancyger, was appointed Aleksander Rebbe in the will of his father in 2005. He has since expanded the Aleksander Hasidic court by building new institutions in Israel and abroad, and attracts many young followers from outside the chassidus. His younger brother, Rabbi Shneur Zalman Dancyger, is the Aleksander Rebbe of Cleveland, Ohio, where he founded the K'hal Yismach Yisroel of Cleveland — a center of Torah, avodah, and chesed with an associated kollel. Through his mother he is a direct descendant of Rabbi Shneur Zalman of Liadi, the Alter Rebbe of Chabad, after whom he is named.

== Important Aleksander literature ==
In addition to learning the chassidic works revered by all groups, Aleksander chassidim learn Aleksander chassidus regularly, often in weekly classes on Thursday evenings in their synagogues. The Aleksander Dynasty has produced a number of classic texts that are revered throughout the Jewish world.

- Yismach Yisroel – The fundamental text of Aleksander ideology. Written by Yerachmiel Dancyger, including many of the teachings of the first Rebbe R' Yechiel. Completed after his death by his brother Shmuel Zvi. (Lodz, 1911)
- Tiferes Shmuel – Written by the third Aleksander Rebbe R' Shmuel Zvi Dancyger. (Lodz, 1923)
- Akeidas Yitzchok – Compiled after the holocaust, this book contains all the surviving teachings of R' Yitzchok Menachem Dancyger. (Israel, 1960)
- Emunas Moshe – A five volume work written by R' Yehuda Moshe Dancyger on the weekly readings and holidays.
- Imrei Menachem – Writings of R' Avraham Menachem Dancyger, currently being compiled and published.
- Imrei Kodesh – The writings of the current Rebbe R' Yisroel Zvi Yoir.
- Derech HaCHassidus – A concise guide to chassidic philosophy, written by R Eliezer Yitzchak Danziger, son of the current rebbe, for young students.

Other works published by the Aleksander sect are:

- Meoron Shel Yisroel – Published in the back of Yismach Yisroel, containing personal accounts and collected teachings of early Aleksander Rebbes by holocaust survivors.
- Roeh Neeman – By Yehuda Makover, is a history of Aleksander, particularly of R' Yitzchak Menachem Dancyger the Akeidas Yitzchok.
- Emuros Tehoros – A weekly publication on the Torah portion
- Karmeinu – A periodical containing teachings, histories and events in the community.
- Perchei HaKerem – A triannual book containing insights by students of the Aleksander Yeshiva.
