= Peshischa =

Hasidic school of thought

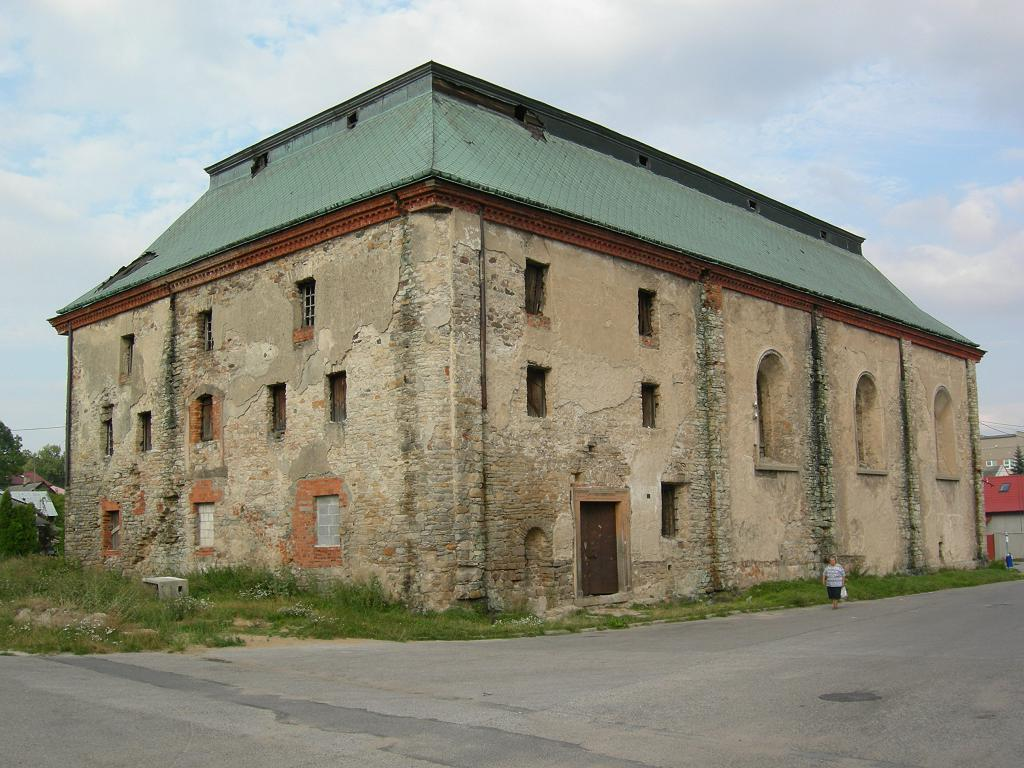
- Grand Synagogue of Przysucha

Founder
- Rabbi Yaakov Yitzchak Rabinowicz

Regions with significant populations
- Israel, United States, Poland

Religions
- Hasidic Judaism

Languages
- Yiddish, Hebrew

Related ethnic groups
- Kotzk, Ger, Amshinov, Zychlin, Aleksander, Vurka, Sochatchov, Porisov, Biala, Izhbitza-Radzin

Peshischa (Yiddish: פשיסחה, romanized: Peshiskhe) was an important school of Hasidic Judaism based out of Przysucha, Poland founded by Yaakov Yitzchak that flourished during the late 18th to early 19th century. Its teachings are the foundation for the Kotzk, Ger, Amshinov, Zychlin, Aleksander, Vurka, Sochatchov, Porisov, Biala and Izhbitza-Radzin strands of Hasidism.

== History ==
Yaakov Yitzchak Rabinowicz preached an elitist, rationalistic Hasidism that centered on Talmudic study and formed a counterpoint to the miracle-centered Hasidism of Lublin. His immediate successor, Simcha Bunim of Peshischa, brought Peshischa to its highest point and kickstarted a counter-revolutionary movement which challenged the Hasidic norm. While under the leadership of Rabinowicz, Peshischa was closer to a philosophy whereas, under Simcha Bunim it was transformed into a religious movement. Under Simcha Bunim's leadership, centers were created across Poland that held ideologically alliance to Peshischa. These centers preached Simcha Bunim's ideals of rationalism, radical personhood, independence and the constant quest for authenticity. He outwardly challenged the dynastic nature of Hasidic rebbes, which led to several unsuccessful attempts by contemporary Hasidic leadership to excommunicate Peshischa. After his death in 1827, Peshischa split into two factions, those of his more radical followers who supported Menachem Mendel of Kotzk as Simcha Bunim's successor and those of his less radical followers who supported the succession of Simcha Bunim's son Avraham Moshe Bonhardt. However, after Avraham Moshe's death a year later in 1828, the community almost unanimously followed Menachem Mendel, who gradually incorporated most of the community into Kotzk. After his death in 1859, Peshischa ceased to exist as a separate movement, yet its ideals still exist as the foundation for a large percentage of modern Hasidism.

== Lineage ==
- R. Jacob Yitzhak Rabinowicz (1765–1814), Grand Rabbi of Przysucha.
  - R. Yerahmiel Tzvi Rabinowicz (1784–1834), Rabbi in Przysucha.
    - R. Nathan David Rabinowicz (1814–1866), Grand Rabbi of Szydłowiec.
      - R. Jacob Yitzhak Rabinowicz (1847–1905), Grand Rabbi of Biala.
        - R. Yerahmiel Tzvi Rabinowicz (1880–1906), Grand Rabbi of Siedlice.
          - R. Yehiel Joshua Rabinowicz (1901–1984), Grand Rabbi of Biala-Jerusalem.
            - R. Benztion Rabinowicz (born 1935), Grand Rabbi of Biala-Jerusalem, member of the Agudat Yisrael.
            - R. David Mattathias Rabinowicz (1927–1997), Grand Rabbi of Biala-Bene Berak.
              - R. Jacob Manehem Rabinowicz, Grand Rabbi of Biala-Bene Berak.
              - R. Aaron Shlomoh Hayyim Rabinowicz, Grand Rabbi of Biala-Borough Park.
              - R. Abrahame Yerahmiel Rabinowicz, Grand Rabbi of Ostrov-Biala.
            - R. Jacob Yitzhak Rabinowicz (1926–2010), Grand Rabbi of Biala-Ramat Aharon.
              - R. Barukh Shlomoh Rabinowicz, Grand Rabbi of Biala-Har Yonah.
              - R. David Yerahmiel Tzvi Rabinowicz, Grand Rabbi of Biala-Ramat Aharon.
            - R. Yerahmiel Tzvi Judah Rabinowicz (1923–2003), Grand Rabbi of Baila-Przysucha.
              - R. Mosheh Rabinowicz, Grand Rabbi of Baila-Przysucha.
              - R. Jacob Elimelekh Rabinowicz, Grand Rabbi of Baila-Przysucha-Ashdod.
              - R. Hayyim Yitzhak Menahem Rabinowicz, Grand Rabbi of Biala-Przysucha-Bene Berak.
              - R. Barukh Leib Rabinowicz, Grand Rabbi of Biala-London.
              - R. Simhah Bentzion Yitzhak Rabinowicz, Grand Rabbi of Biala-Przysucha-Ramat Shlomoh.
          - R. Nathan David Rabinowicz (1899–1947), Grand Rabbi of Biala-London.
            - Dr. Tzvi (Harry) M. Rabinowicz (1919–2002), Author of several academic works on Hasidism.
        - R. Nathan David Rabinowicz (1868–1930), Grand Rabbi of Parczev.
          - R. Moses Yehiel Elimelekh Rabinowicz (1895–1942), Grand Rabbi of Parzcev.
          - R. Barukh Joshua Yerahmiel Rabinowicz (1914–1997), Grand Rabbi of Munkacs, and later Chief Rabbi of Holon.
            - R. Mosheh Leib Rabinowicz (born 1940), Grand Rabbi of Munkacs-Borough Park.
            - R. Yitzhak Jacob Rabinowicz, Grand Rabbi of Dynov-Williamsburg.
      - R. Tzemah Barukh Rabinowicz (1836–1892), Grand Rabbi of Szydlowiec.
      - R. Pinhas Rabinowicz (died 1901), Grand Rabbi of Końskie.
        - R. Joseph Eliezer Rabinowicz, Grand Rabbi of Radom.
        - R. Jacob Yitzhak Elimelekh Rabinowicz, Grand Rabbi of Suchedniów.
        - R. Nathan David Rabinowicz, Grand Rabbi of Konskie
      - R. Shragai Yair Rabinowicz (1839–1912), Grand Rabbi of Bialobrzegi.
    - R. Elimelekh Shapira (1826–1892), Grand Rabbi of Grodzisk. Son-in-law of R. Yerahmiel Tzvi Rabinowicz.
  - R. Nehemiah Yehiel Rabinowicz (1808–1853), Grand Rabbi of Bychava.
    - R. Hayyim Gedaliah Rabinowicz (died 1904), Grand Rabbi of Bychava.
  - R. Joshua Asher Rabinowicz (1804–1862), Grand Rabbi of Parysov.
    - R. Abraham David Naftali Yerahmiel (1843–1912), Grand Rabbi of Parysov.
    - R. Jacob Tvzi Rabinowicz (died 1889), Grand Rabbi of Parysov.
      - R. Uri Joshua Asher Elhanan Ashkenazi (1870–1941), Grand Rabbi of Kolobiel.
      - R. Yitzhak Isaiah Halberstam (1864–1943), Grand Rabbi of Czchów (Czechov). Son of R. Hayyim Halberstam (1797–1876), Grand Rabbi of Zanz, and son-in-law of R. Jacob Tzvi Rabinowicz.
    - R. Meir Shalom Rabinowicz (died 1903), Grand Rabbi of Kałuszyn.
      - R. Joseph Rabinowicz (died 1938), Grand Rabbi of Kaluszyn.
      - R. Eliezer Elimelekh Rabinowicz (1860–1935), Grand Rabbi of Radom. Scion of the Belz Dynasty, son-in-law of R. Meir Shalom Rabinowicz.
    - R. Areyh Mordecai Rabinowicz (died 1885), Rabbi in Jerusalem.
      - R. Jacob Aaron Rabinowicz (born 1853), Grand Rabbi of Nowa Słupia and Ostrov.
        - R. Areyh Mordecai Rabinowicz (1885–1955), First Chief Rabbi of Bene Berak.
      - R. Joshua Asher Rabinowicz (1865–1943), Rabbi in Jerusalem.
        - R. Areyh Mordecai Rabinowicz (1901–1980), Rabbi in Jerusalem
          - R. Benjamin Rabinowicz (1912–2002), Grand Rabbi of Mishkenot HaRoim.
            - R. Akiva Rabinowicz, Grand Rabbi of Parysov-Batei Warsaw.
            - R. Meir Shalom Rabinowicz, Grand Rabbi of Kaluszyn-Bene Berak.
            - R. Hayyim Rabinowicz, Grand Rabbi of Mishkenot HaRoim.
          - R. Ephraim Fischel Rabinowicz (1924–2005), Member of the Mo'etzet Gedolei HaTorah.
  - R. Samuel Rapheals, Grand Rabbi of Jozefov - Son-in-law of R. Jacob Yitzhak Rabinowicz
    - R. Abraham Moses Bonhardt (1800–1829), Grand Rabbi of Przysucha. Son of R. Simhah Bunem Bonhardt, Grand Rabbi of Przysucha, and son-in-law of R. Samuel Rapheals.
      - R. Tzvi Hirsch Mordecai Bonhardt (1826–1866), Grand Rabbi of Przysucha.
        - R. Yitzhak Bonhardt (1857–1934), Rabbi in Zwolen.
          - R. David Mordecai Bonhardt (1878–1936), Grand Rabbi of Osiek.
          - R. Simhah Bunem Bonhardt (1877–1942), Rabbi in Będzin (Bedin).
        - R. Fischel Heller (born 1821), Grand Rabbi of Makov. Great-grandson of R. Hayyim Heikel (died 1787), Grand Rabbi of Amdur, and son-in-law of R. Abraham Moses Bonhardt.
  - R. Moses Biderman (1777–1851), Grand Rabbi of Lelov-Jerusalem. Son of R. David Biderman (1746–1813), Grand Rabbi of Lelov, and son-in-law of R. Jacob Yitzhak Rabinowicz.
