= Israel Yitzhak Kalish =

Hasidic rebbe

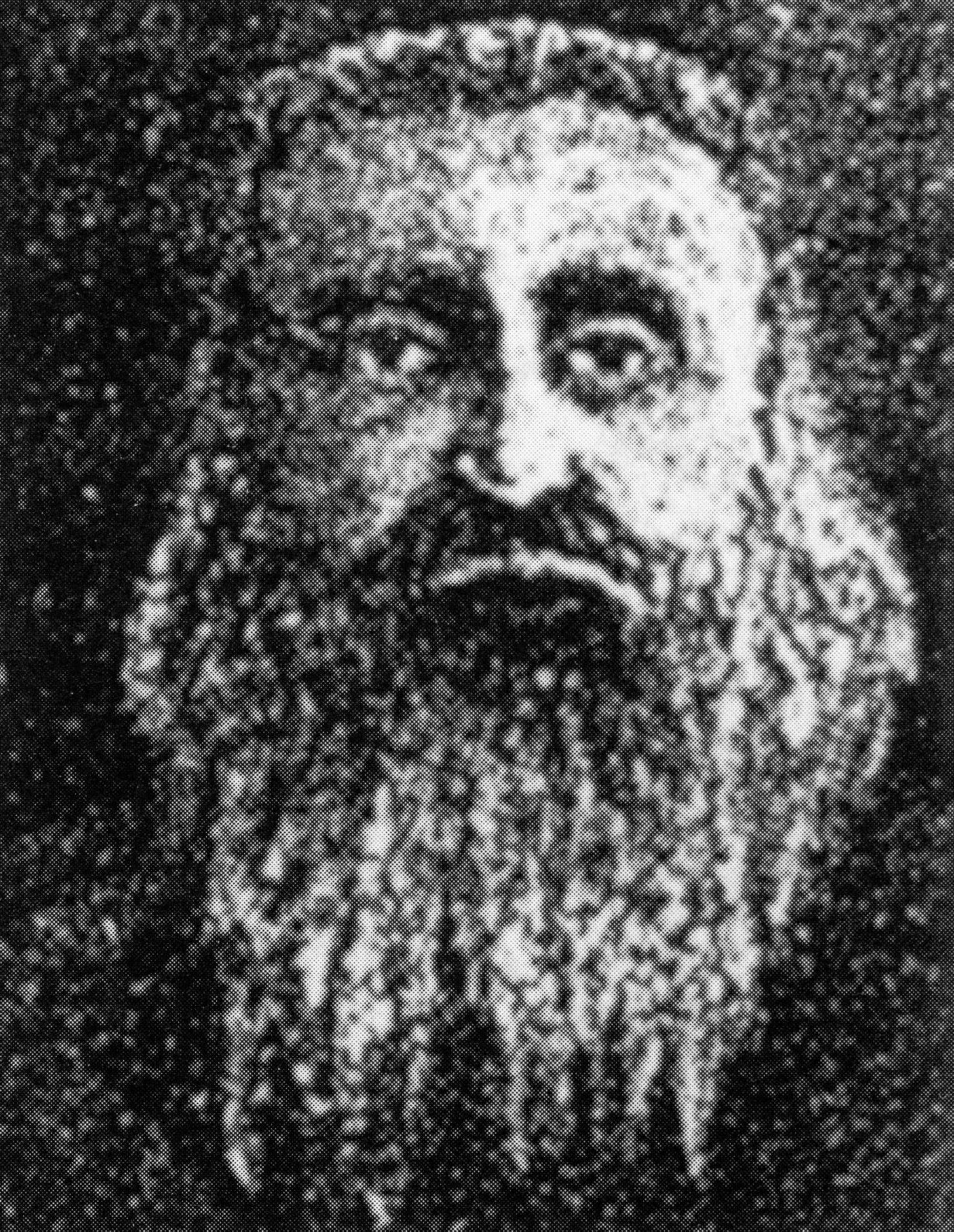

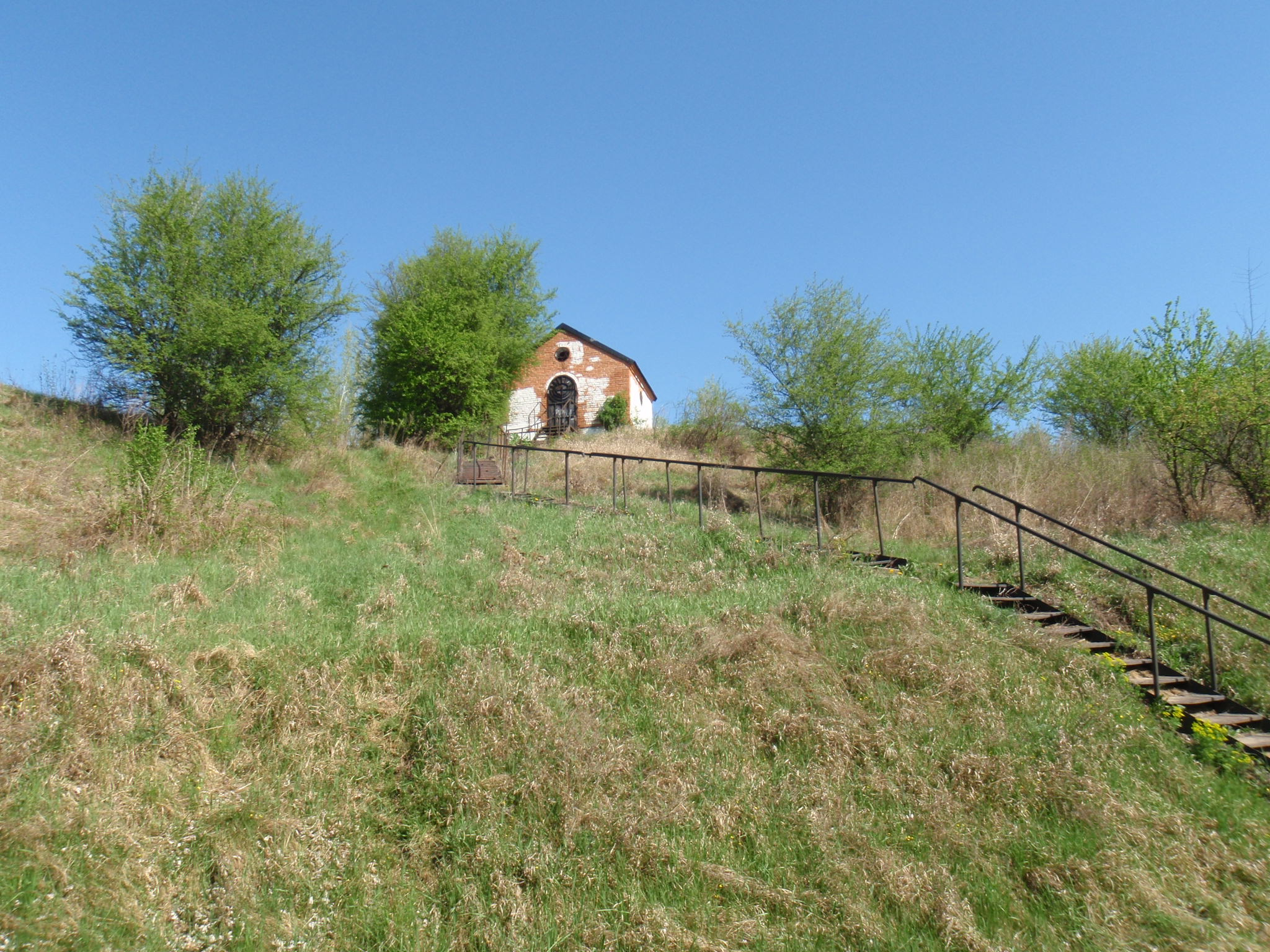
Ohel of Israel Yitzhak Kalish

Israel Yitzhak Kalish of Warka (Yitzchok of Vurka) (1779–1848) was the first hasidic rebbe of Warka.

In 1829 he moved to Przysucha, where his master tzadik Simcha Bunim of Peshischa was teaching. Eventually he settled in Warka. Together with rabbi Yitzchak Meir Alter from Ger, he coped with Russian ukases (decrees), prohibiting wearing traditional Jewish clothes.

== Personal life ==
His sons were Yaakov David Kalish, founder of the Amshinov hasidic dynasty in Mszczonów, and Menachem Mendel Kalish, his successor in Warka.

== Death ==
He died in 1848. An ohel (small prayerhouse-like structure built over the grave) was constructed in 1990 in his honor in the Polish town of Warka, where he is buried.

== Notable Disciples ==
- Rabbi Moshe Biderman of Lelov (1776-1851)
- Rabbi Shraga Fayvel Dancyger (d. 1848) of Aleksander
- Rabbi Yaakov Aryeh Guterman of Radzymin (1792-1874)

== Bibliography ==
- Martin Buber Opowieści chasydów ISBN 83-7033-532-2
