= Porisov (Hasidic dynasty) =

Porisov is a Hasidic dynasty founded by Rebbe Yehoshua Osher Rabinowicz, son of Rebbe Yaakov Yitzchak Rabinowicz. The current Rebbe of Porisov is Rebbe Akiva Rabinowicz.

Porisov is the Yiddish name of Parysów, a town in present-day Poland.

== Lineage ==
Lineage of the dynasty before World War II:

- Rebbe Yehoshua Osher Rabinowicz (died 1862)
  - Rebbe Yaakov Tzvi Rabinowicz (died 1888)
    - Rebbe Uri Yehoshua Elchanan Rabinowicz (died 1941)
      - Rebbe Yaakov Tzvi Rabinowicz (killed in Treblinka)
  - Rebbe Avraham Rabinowicz (died 1912)
    - Rebbe Yehoshua Osher Rabinowicz (died 1935)
      - Rebbe Yaakov Tzvi Rabinowicz
      - Rebbe Yissachar Dov Rabinowicz (killed in the Holocaust)
  - Rebbe Meir Shalom Rabinowicz (died 1903)
    - Rebbe Yehoshua Osher Rabinowicz (died 1937)
      - Rebbe Meir Shalom Rabinowicz
    - Rebbe Shmuel Mordechai Rabinowicz

== See also ==
- History of the Jews in Poland
