= Przysucha =

Town in Masovian Voivodeship, Poland

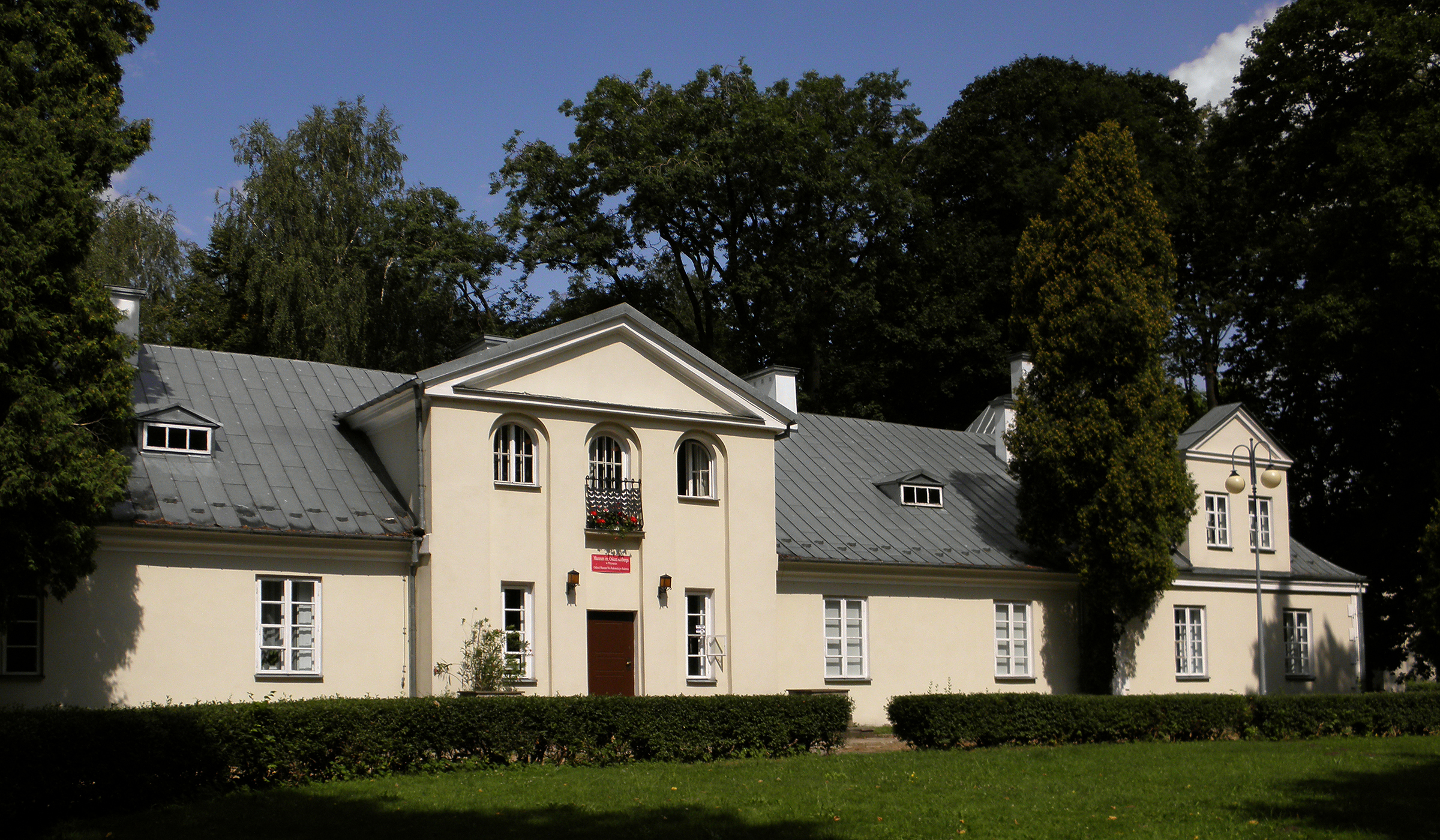
- Dembiński manor

- Coat of arms

- Location within Poland
- Coordinates: 51°22′N 20°37′E
- Country: Poland
- Voivodeship: Masovian
- County: Przysucha
- Gmina: Przysucha
- Established: 15th century
- Town rights: 1710

Government
  - Mayor: Tadeusz Tomasik

Area
  - Total: 6.98 km^{2} (2.69 sq mi)

Population (2006)
  - Total: 6,245
  - Density: 895/km^{2} (2,320/sq mi)
- Time zone: UTC+1 (CET)
  - Summer (DST): UTC+2 (CEST)
- Postal code: 26-400
- Area code: +48 48
- Car plates: WPY
- Website: przysucha.pl

Przysucha [pʂɨˈsuxa] (Note: Yiddish: פשיסכע, romanized: Pshiskhe) is a town in south-central Poland. Located in historic Lesser Poland, it is part of the Masovian Voivodeship, about 100 km (62 mi) southwest of Warsaw and 40 km (25 mi) west of Radom. It is the capital of Przysucha County, and the town 6,762 inhabitants (2004).

Przysucha is located on the Radomka river, along national road nr. 12 (which in the future will make Expressway S12). Rail station Przysucha is located in the village of Skrzyńsko, on the line from Radom to Łódź.

The town had a significant role to play in the development of Hasidic Judaism in Poland and a notable school of Hasidism, Peshischa, is named for it.

== History ==
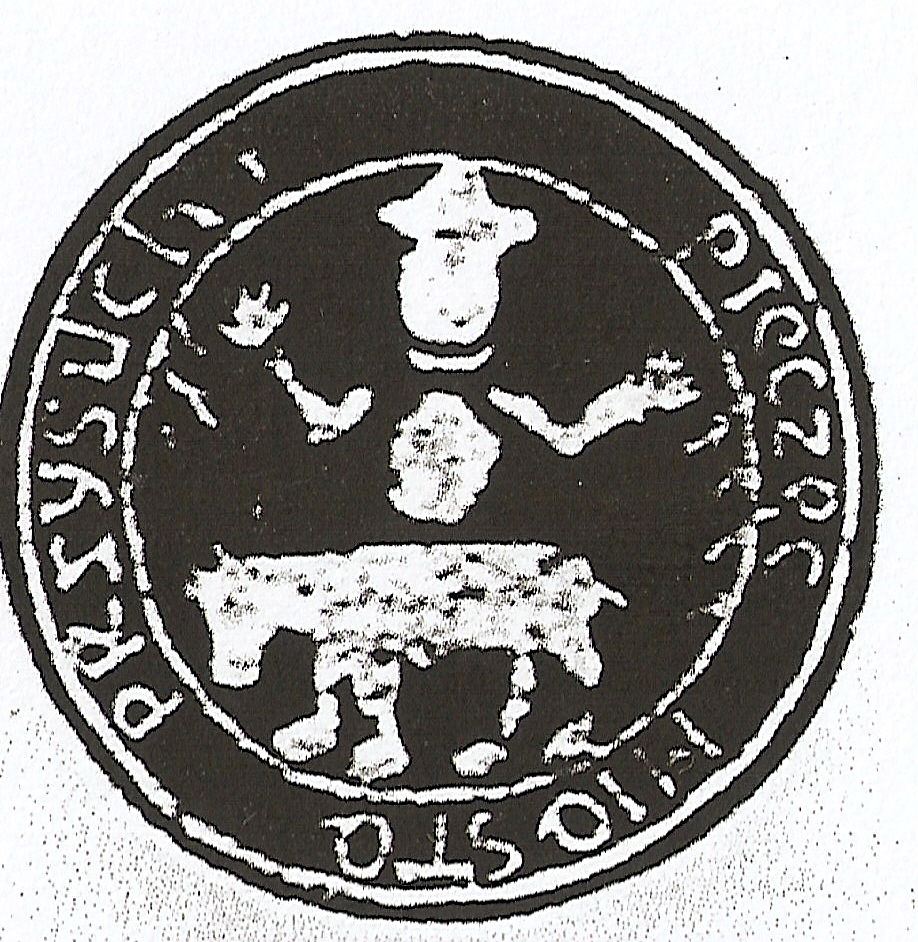
18th-century seal

First mention of Przesucha, as it was known then, comes from 1415. In the early 16th century, the village belonged to the Morsztyn family. Przysucha had a public house, a watermill, and a forge, and it belonged to the parish of Skrzyńsko. On December 11, 1710, upon a royal privilege, issued by King Augustus II the Strong, artisans were allowed to settle in the town, and a weekly market was established. Later on, two markets a week were permitted, and a manufactory was opened in town, along the Radomka river.

German artisans from Silesia and Saxony founded in the early 18th century a settlement called Czermno, which today is part of Przysucha. In Przysucha itself, the number of Jews rapidly grew. At that time, the town was a major center of Hasidism. In 1777, Przysucha had 39 German, 85 Jewish, and 29 Polish houses. The town was divided into three parts - Germans lived in Czermno, Jews in Przysucha, and Poles - in Urszulin. Przysucha also was one of centers of early industry. In the late 18th century, it had a blast furnace, a sawmill, and a paper mill. Since its origins to 1795 Przysucha belonged to Sandomierz Voivodeship in the Lesser Poland Province.

The town was annexed by Austria in the Third Partition of Poland in 1795. It was regained by Poles following the Austro–Polish War of 1809, and included within the short-lived Duchy of Warsaw. After the duchy's dissolution, in 1815, it fell to the Russian Partition of Poland. The period of prosperity ended. Przysucha remained a private town, and its industry was obsolete. In 1870, Tsarist authorities deprived Przysucha of its town rights. Przysucha was a center of Hasidic Judaism. Seven important Hasidic rebbes, such as The Holy Jew and Simcha Bunim of Peshischa, are buried in the town's Jewish cemetery, established soon after Jews settled in the area in 1713. The Przysucha Synagogue was built between 1764 and 1777, and is the largest extant baroque synagogue in Poland. The Yiddish name of the town is פּשיסכע or פשיסחא or פשיסכא (pronounced: Pshiskhe).

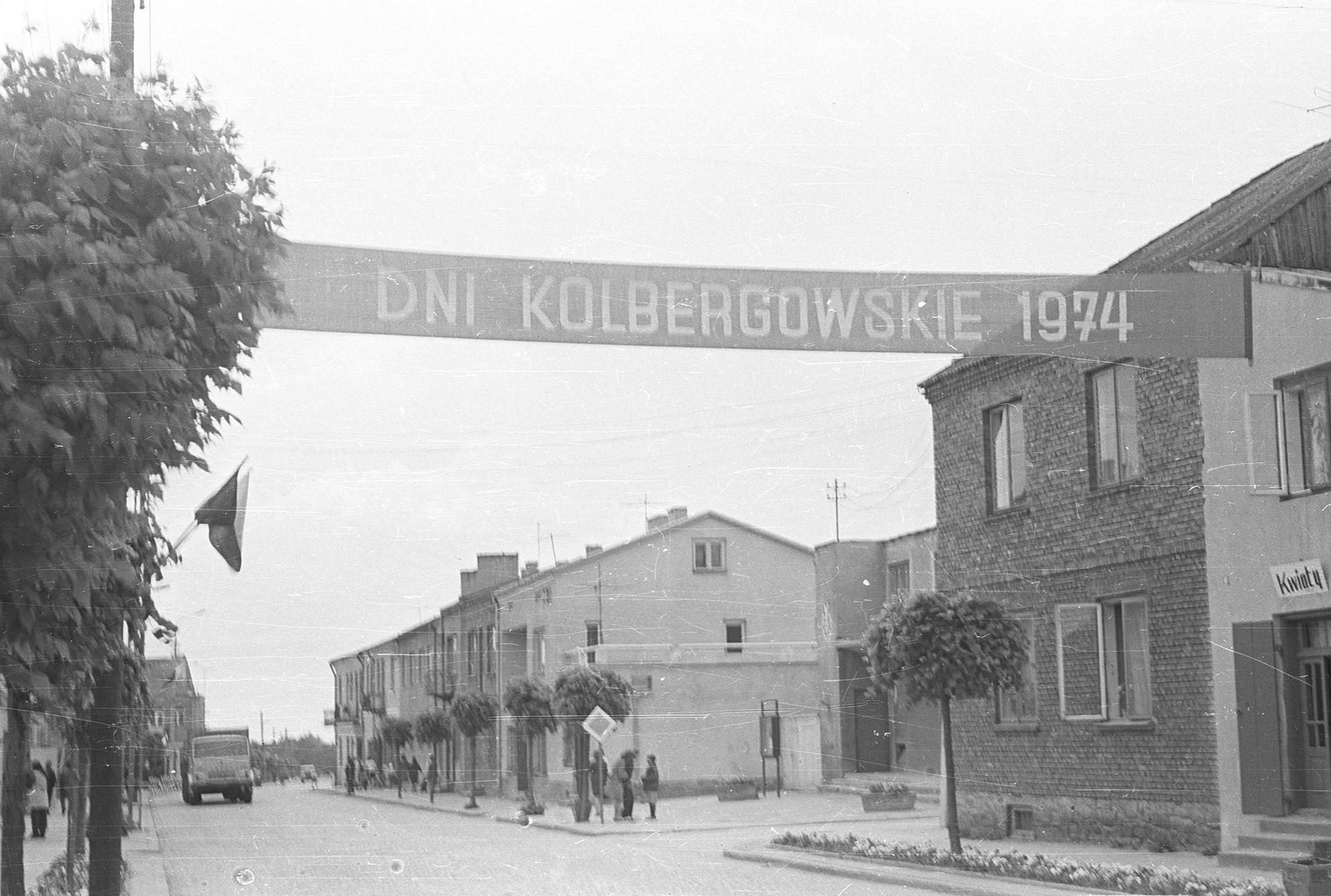
Przysucha during "Kolberg Days" in 1974

After World War I, in 1918, Poland regained independence and control of the town. According to the 1921 census, the population of Przysucha with the adjacent manor farm was 43.3% Polish and 56.7% Jewish.

During World War II, Przysucha was bombed on September 6, 1939, when 70 houses were destroyed. Several Poles, who were either born or lived and worked in Przysucha, were murdered by the Russians in the Katyn massacre in 1940. Germans opened a ghetto with more than 5,000 Jews and murdered most of them at the Treblinka extermination camp. Polish underground resistance was strong in Przysucha and the county. On September 6, 1944, German forces lost 140 soldiers, and 230 were wounded in a battle near the village of Stefanów. Soviet troops entered the town on January 17, 1945.

Immediately after the war, Przysucha had 1,500 inhabitants. In 1956 it became the seat of a county, and two years later it regained its town rights. During Communist times, several enterprises were opened there - clay mine, ceramics factory, fruit and vegetable processor.

== Sights ==
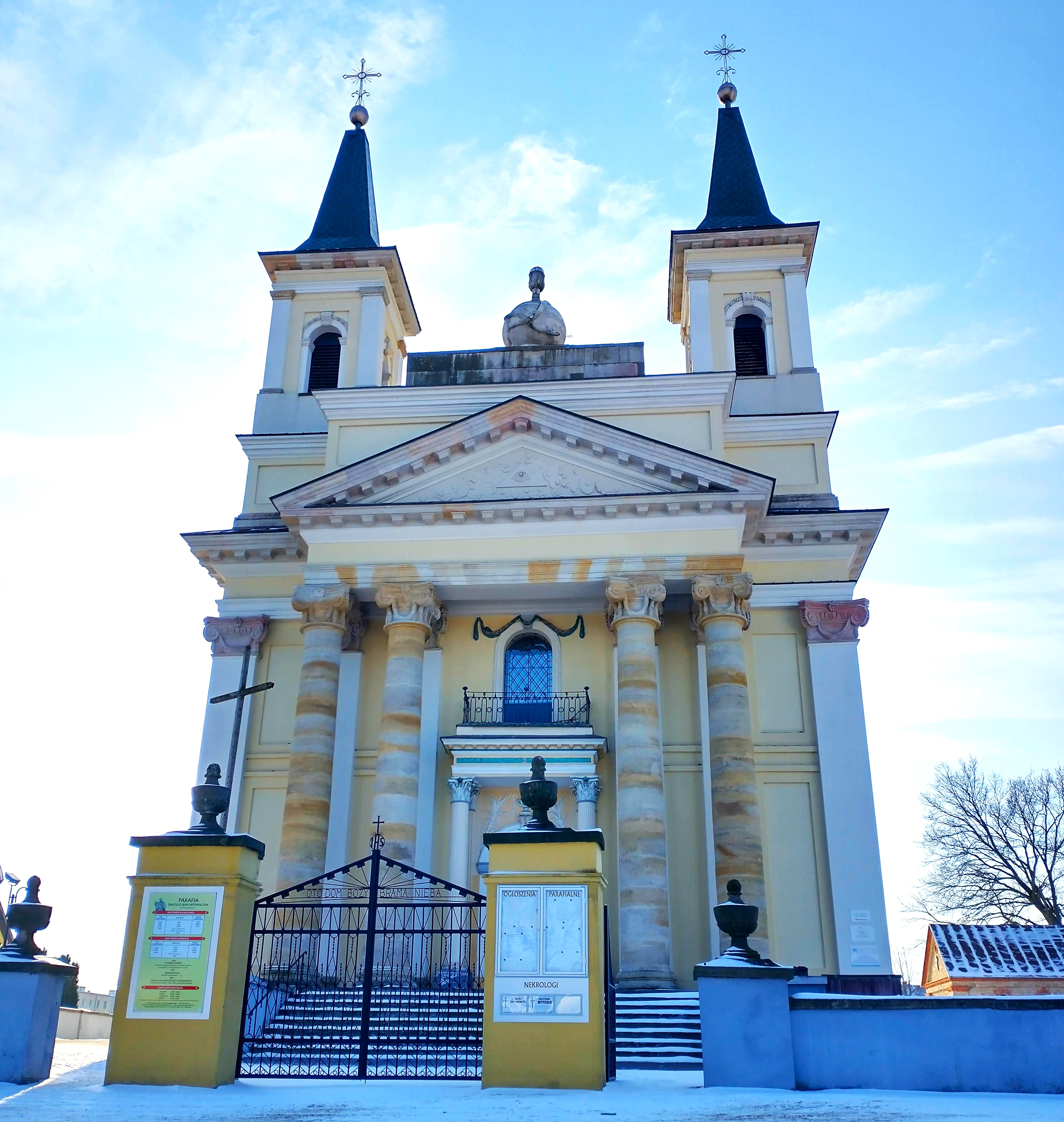
Saint John of Nepomuk church

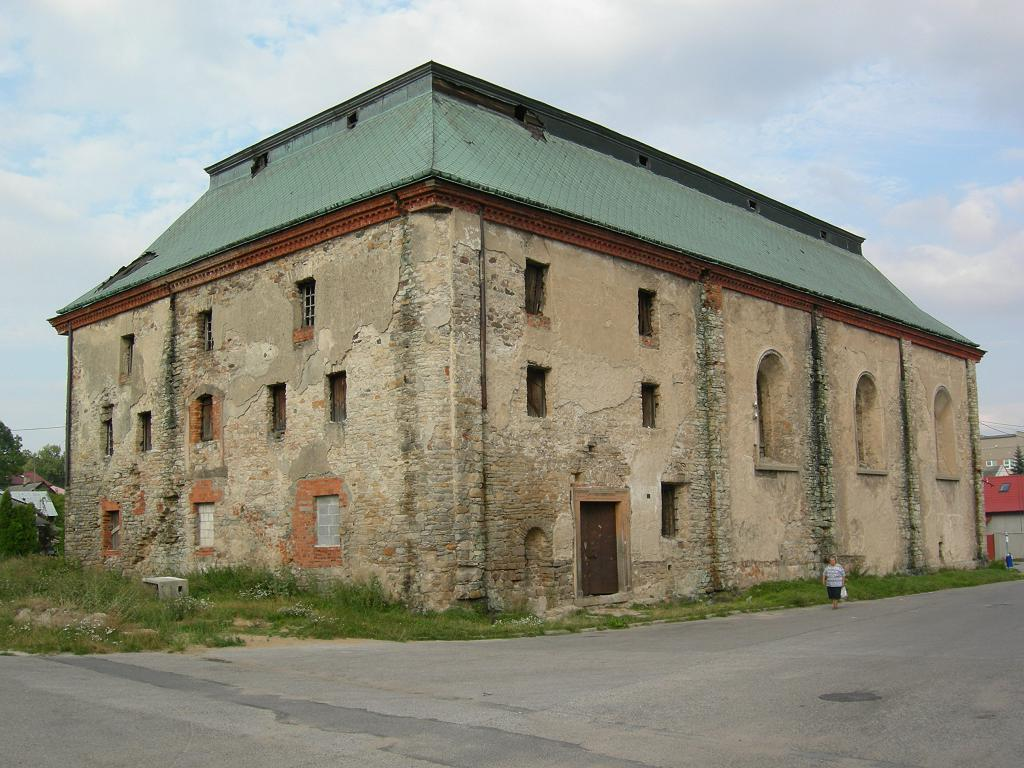
Synagogue in 2007, before restoration

Among points of interest are:

- Neoclassical parish church of Saints John of Nepomuk and Ignatius of Loyola (1780-1786),
- Dembiński Manor House, currently a museum,
- 19th century houses,
- former synagogue,
- Jewish cemetery,
- monument of Polish soldiers at the main square.
