= Moshe Biderman =

Polish Rabbi (1776-1851)

Rabbi Moshe Biderman
- Title: Lelover Rebbe

Personal life
- Born: 1776 Łachów, Świętokrzyskie Voivodeship, Poland
- Died: December 18, 1851 (aged 74–75) Jerusalem, Ottoman Empire
- Buried: Mount of Olives
- Spouse: Rivka Rochel Rabinowicz
- Parents: Rabbi Dovid Biderman (father); Chana (mother)
- Dynasty: Lelov

Religious life
- Religion: Judaism

Jewish leader
- Predecessor: Rabbi Dovid Biderman
- Successor: Rabbi Eleazar Mendel Biderman
- Yahrtzeit: 13 Tevet
- Dynasty: Lelov

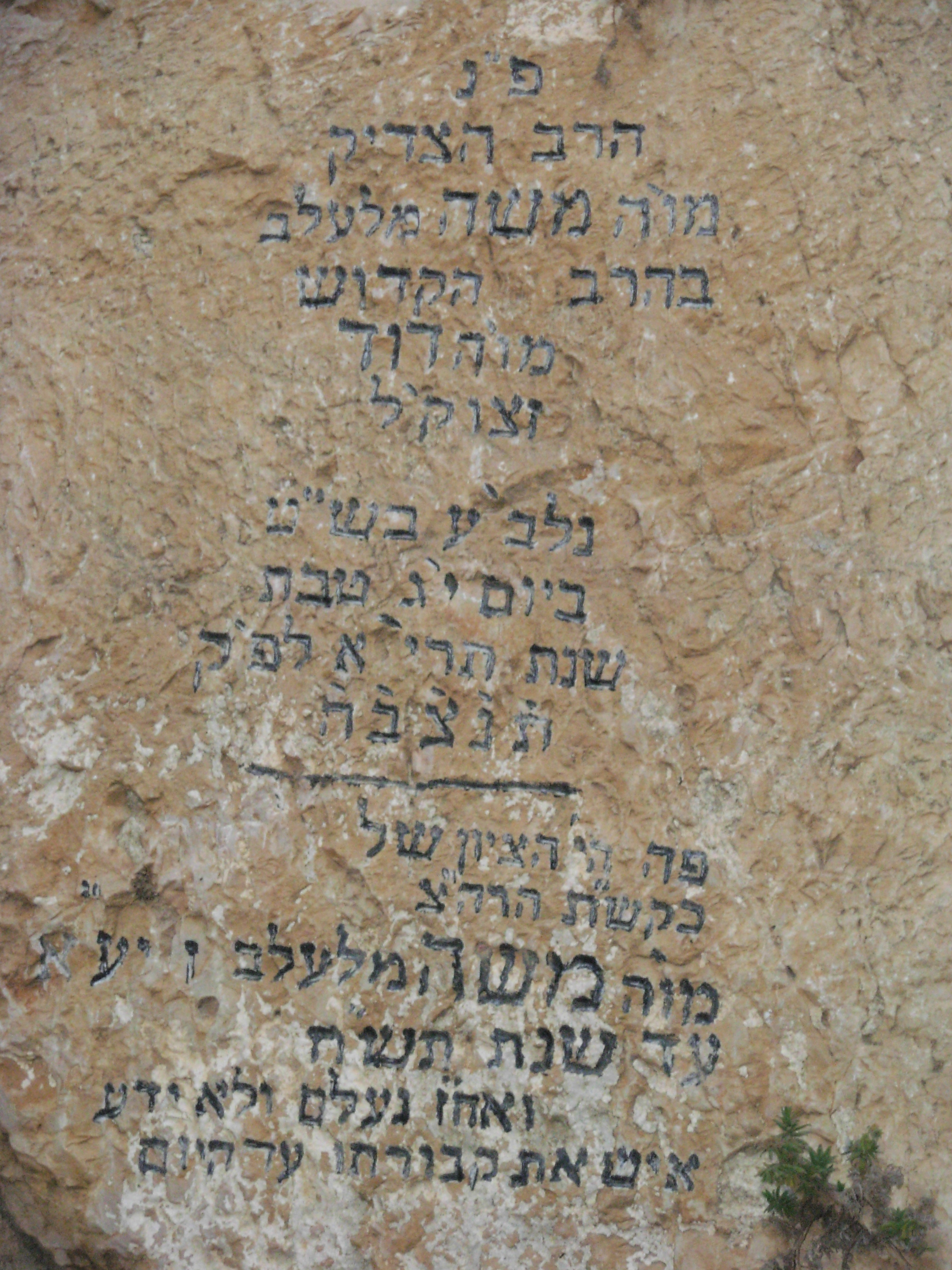
Tombstone of Rabbi Moshe Biderman

Grand Rabbi Moshe Biderman (1776-1851) of Lelów was the 2nd Rebbe of the Lelov Hassidic dynasty.

== Biography ==
Rabbi Moshe Biderman was born into abject poverty in Łachów, Świętokrzyskie Voivodeship, Poland in 1776. His father, Rabbi Dovid Biderman was the founder of the Lelov Hassidic dynasty. After his first wife died, Rabbi Moshe married Rivka Rochel, the daughter of Rabbi Yaakov Yitzchak Rabinowicz. After the death of his father and his father-in-law, Rabbi Moshe Biderman along with his friend Rabbi Israel Yitzhak Kalish of Vurka became a disciple of Rabbi Simcha Bunim of Peshischa. In 1847, Rabbi Kalish died and Rabbi Biderman, finally, agreed to accept a leadership position and became the Rabbi of Przedborz. Shortly before Rabbi Biderman's death, he decided to leave Poland and immigrate to Eretz Yisroel. 72 days after arriving in Jerusalem, he died on December 18, 1851, and was buried on Mount of Olives near the tomb of the prophet Zacharia.

== Notable Disciples ==
- Rabbi Shlomo Rabinowicz of Radomsk

== See also ==
- Lelov
