= Międzylesie (disambiguation) =

Międzylesie is a town in Kłodzko County, Lower Silesian Voivodeship (SW Poland).

Międzylesie (meaning "amid the forest") may also refer to:

- Międzylesie, Jelenia Góra County in Lower Silesian Voivodeship (south-west Poland)
- Międzylesie, Świętokrzyskie Voivodeship (south-central Poland)
- Międzylesie, Gmina Secemin in Świętokrzyskie Voivodeship (south-central Poland)
- Międzylesie, Oborniki County in Greater Poland Voivodeship (west-central Poland)
- Międzylesie, Turek County in Greater Poland Voivodeship (west-central Poland)
- Międzylesie, Wągrowiec County in Greater Poland Voivodeship (west-central Poland)
- Międzylesie, Świebodzin County in Lubusz Voivodeship (west Poland)
- Międzylesie, Żagań County in Lubusz Voivodeship (west Poland)
- Międzylesie, Pomeranian Voivodeship (north Poland)
- Międzylesie, Olsztyn County in Warmian-Masurian Voivodeship (north Poland)
- Międzylesie, Ostróda County in Warmian-Masurian Voivodeship (north Poland)
- Międzylesie, West Pomeranian Voivodeship (north-west Poland)
- Międzylesie, borough of Wawer district in Warsaw, Poland since 2002
