= Zakrzów, Włoszczowa County =

Zakrzów
- Village
- Location within Poland
- Coordinates: 50°45′46″N 19°54′55″E
- Country: Poland
- Voivodeship: Świętokrzyskie
- County: Włoszczowa
- Gmina: Secemin
- Population: 50

Zakrzów [ˈzakʂuf] is a village in the administrative district of Gmina Secemin, within Włoszczowa County, Świętokrzyskie Voivodeship, in south-central Poland. It lies approximately 6 km (4 mi) east of Secemin, 11 km (7 mi) south of Włoszczowa, and 52 km (32 mi) west of the regional capital Kielce.
