= Wola Czaryska =

- Village
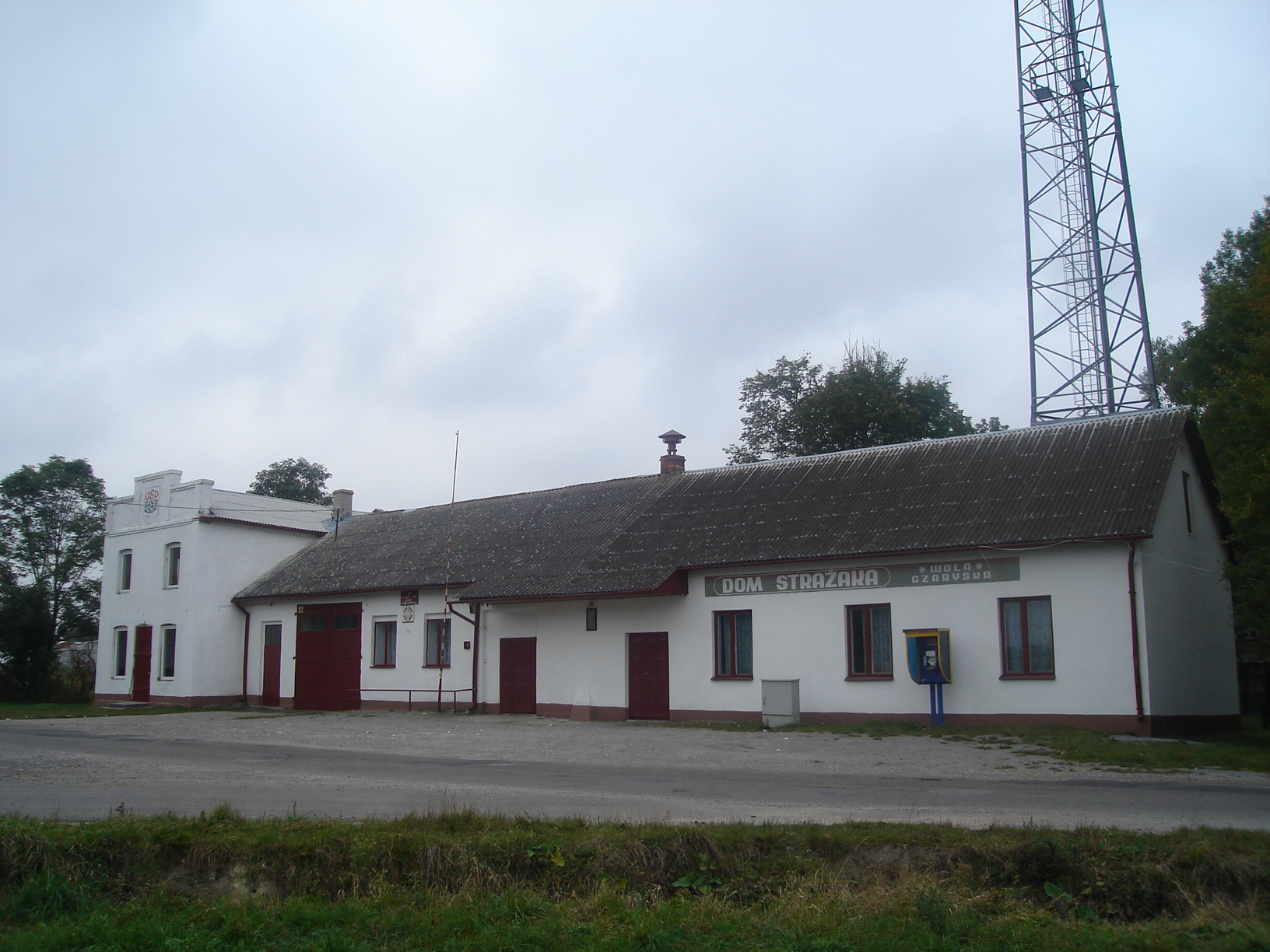
- Fire station

- Location within Poland
- Coordinates: 50°42′34″N 19°52′27″E
- Country: Poland
- Voivodeship: Świętokrzyskie
- County: Włoszczowa
- Gmina: Secemin
- Population (2021): 214

Wola Czaryska [ˈvɔla t͡ʂaˈrɨska] is a village in the administrative district of Gmina Secemin, within Włoszczowa County, Świętokrzyskie Voivodeship, in south-central Poland. It lies approximately 7 km (4 mi) south of Secemin, 18 km (11 mi) south of Włoszczowa, and 56 km (35 mi) west of the regional capital Kielce. As of 2021, the village had a population of 214.
