= Czaryż =

- Village
- Location within Poland
- Coordinates: 50°43′N 19°53′E
- Country: Poland
- Voivodeship: Świętokrzyskie
- County: Włoszczowa
- Gmina: Secemin
- Population: 220

Czaryż [ˈt͡ʂarɨʂ] is a village in the administrative district of Gmina Secemin, within Włoszczowa County, Świętokrzyskie Voivodeship, in south-central Poland. It lies approximately 7 km (4 mi) south-east of Secemin, 17 km (11 mi) south of Włoszczowa, and 55 km (34 mi) west of the regional capital Kielce.
