= Żelisławice, Świętokrzyskie Voivodeship =

Żelisławice
- Village
- Location within Poland
- Coordinates: 50°48′45″N 19°51′26″E
- Country: Poland
- Voivodeship: Świętokrzyskie
- County: Włoszczowa
- Gmina: Secemin
- Population: 440

Żelisławice [ʐɛliswaˈvit͡sɛ] is a village in the administrative district of Gmina Secemin, within Włoszczowa County, Świętokrzyskie Voivodeship, in south-central Poland. It lies approximately 6 km (4 mi) north of Secemin, 9 km (6 mi) south-west of Włoszczowa, and 54 km (34 mi) west of the regional capital Kielce.
