= Marchocice, Świętokrzyskie Voivodeship =

Marchocice
- Village
- Location within Poland
- Coordinates: 50°46′43″N 19°52′9″E
- Country: Poland
- Voivodeship: Świętokrzyskie
- County: Włoszczowa
- Gmina: Secemin

Marchocice [marxɔˈt͡ɕit͡sɛ] is a village in the administrative district of Gmina Secemin, within Włoszczowa County, Świętokrzyskie Voivodeship, in south-central Poland. It lies approximately 3 km (2 mi) north-east of Secemin, 11 km (7 mi) south-west of Włoszczowa, and 54 km (34 mi) west of the regional capital Kielce.
