= Wola Kuczkowska =

- Village
- Location within Poland
- Coordinates: 50°43′41″N 19°46′15″E
- Country: Poland
- Voivodeship: Świętokrzyskie
- County: Włoszczowa
- Gmina: Secemin
- Population: 250

Wola Kuczkowska [ˈvɔla kut͡ʂˈkɔfska] is a village in the administrative district of Gmina Secemin, within Włoszczowa County, Świętokrzyskie Voivodeship, in south-central Poland. It lies approximately 7 km (4 mi) south-west of Secemin, 20 km (12 mi) south-west of Włoszczowa, and 62 km (39 mi) west of the regional capital Kielce.
