= Wincentów, Włoszczowa County =

Wincentów
- Settlement
- Location within Poland
- Coordinates: 50°49′30″N 19°50′30″E
- Country: Poland
- Voivodeship: Świętokrzyskie
- County: Włoszczowa
- Gmina: Secemin

Wincentów [vinˈt͡sɛntuf] is a settlement in the administrative district of Gmina Secemin, within Włoszczowa County, Świętokrzyskie Voivodeship, in south-central Poland. It lies approximately 7 km (4 mi) north of Secemin, 10 km (6 mi) west of Włoszczowa, and 55 km (34 mi) west of the regional capital Kielce.
