= Lelov =

Polish Hasidic dynasty

Lelov (Yiddish: לעֶלוֹב) is a Polish-Israeli Hasidic dynastic court, which traces its origins to the town of Lelów, Poland where the court was established in 1815 by Rabbi Dovid Biderman (1746–1814).

The Lelover dynasty migrated from Poland to Jerusalem when Biderman's son, Rabbi Moshe Biderman (1776–1851), the son-in-law of Rabbi Yaakov Yitzchak Rabinowicz, moved there in the last year of his life. In the 21st century several descendants of the dynasty are Lelover rebbes, in Bnei Brak, Jerusalem, Beit Shemesh and Brooklyn.

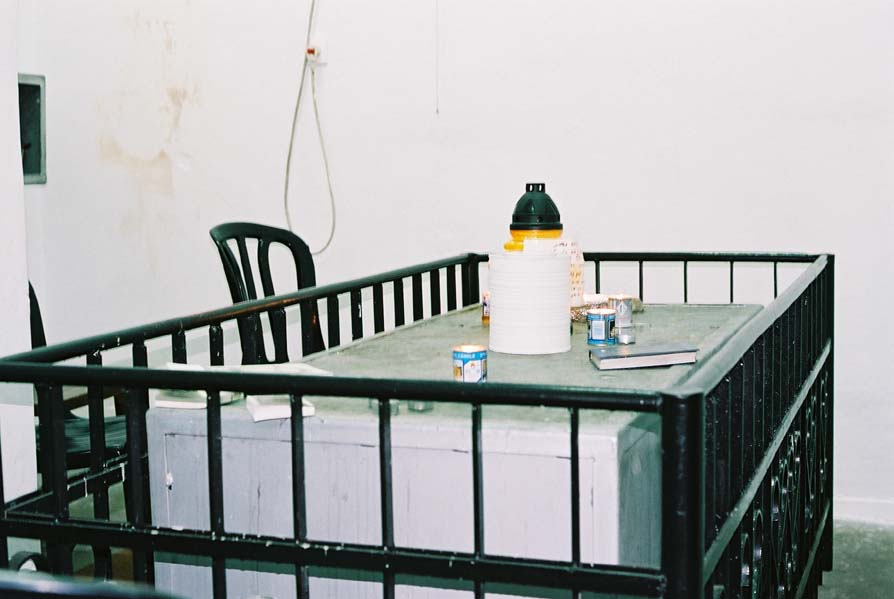
Tombstone of Reb Dovid of Lelov

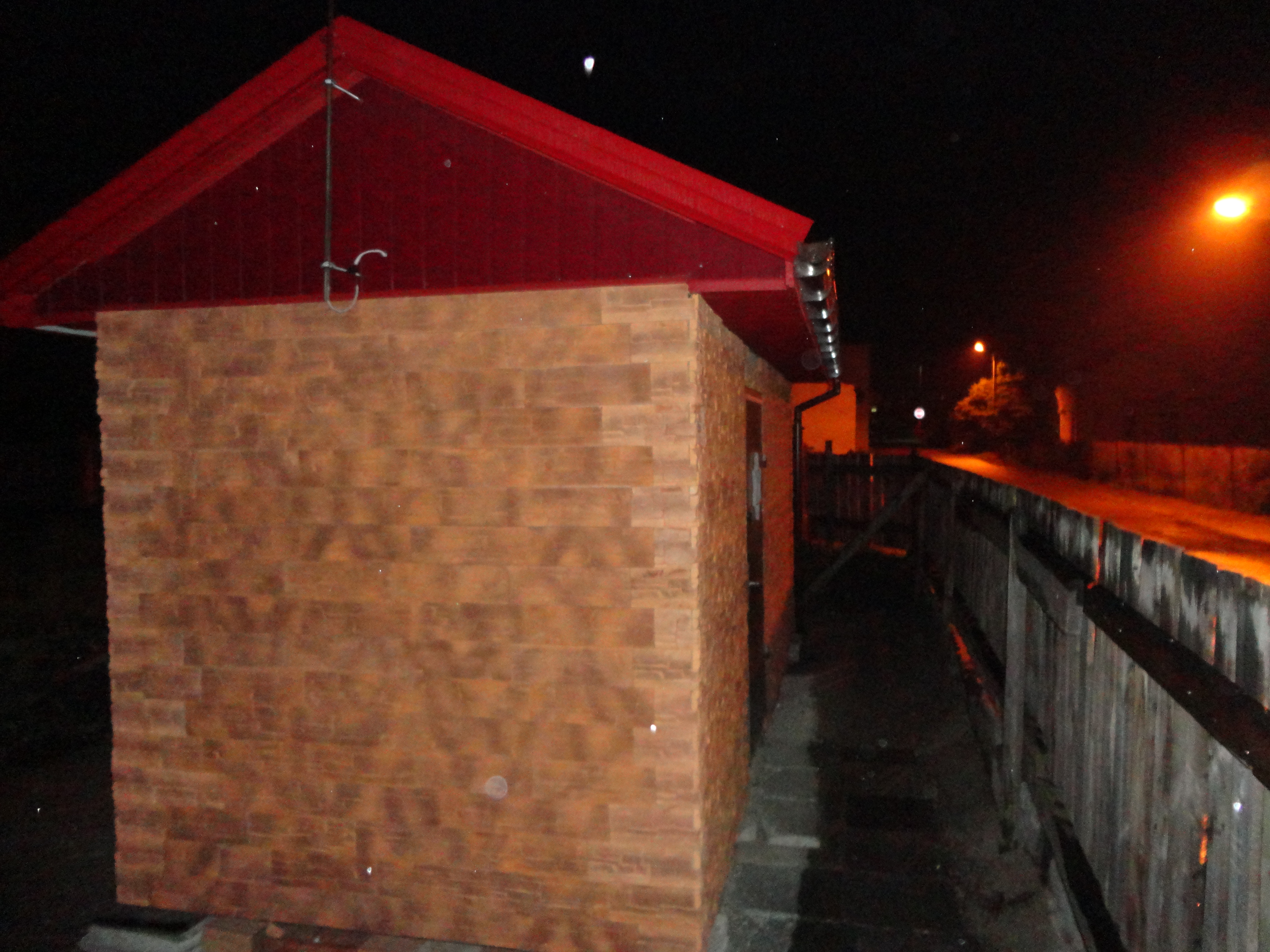
The grave of Rabbi Dovid of Lelov today

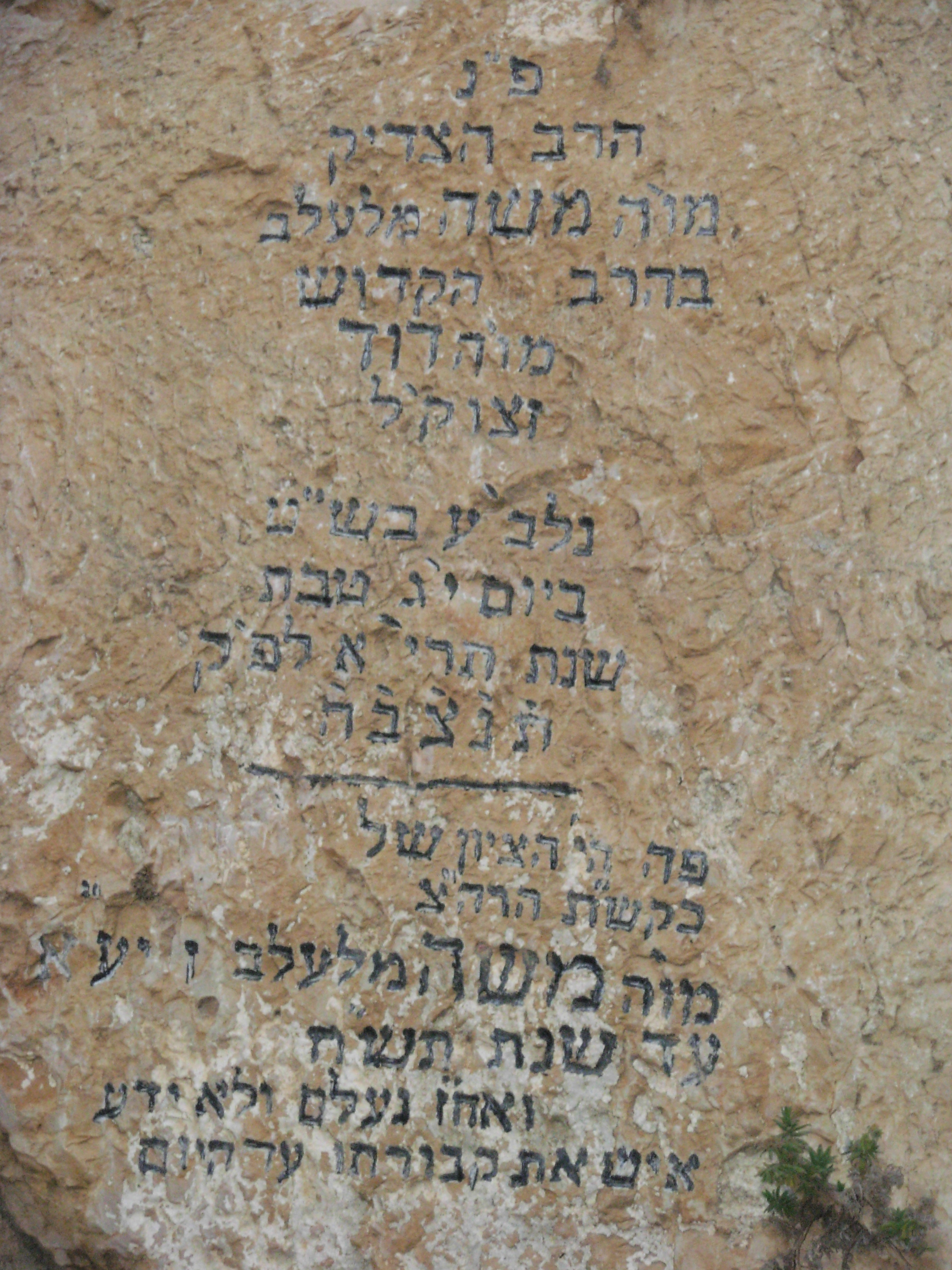
Tombstone of Rabbi Moshe of Lelov

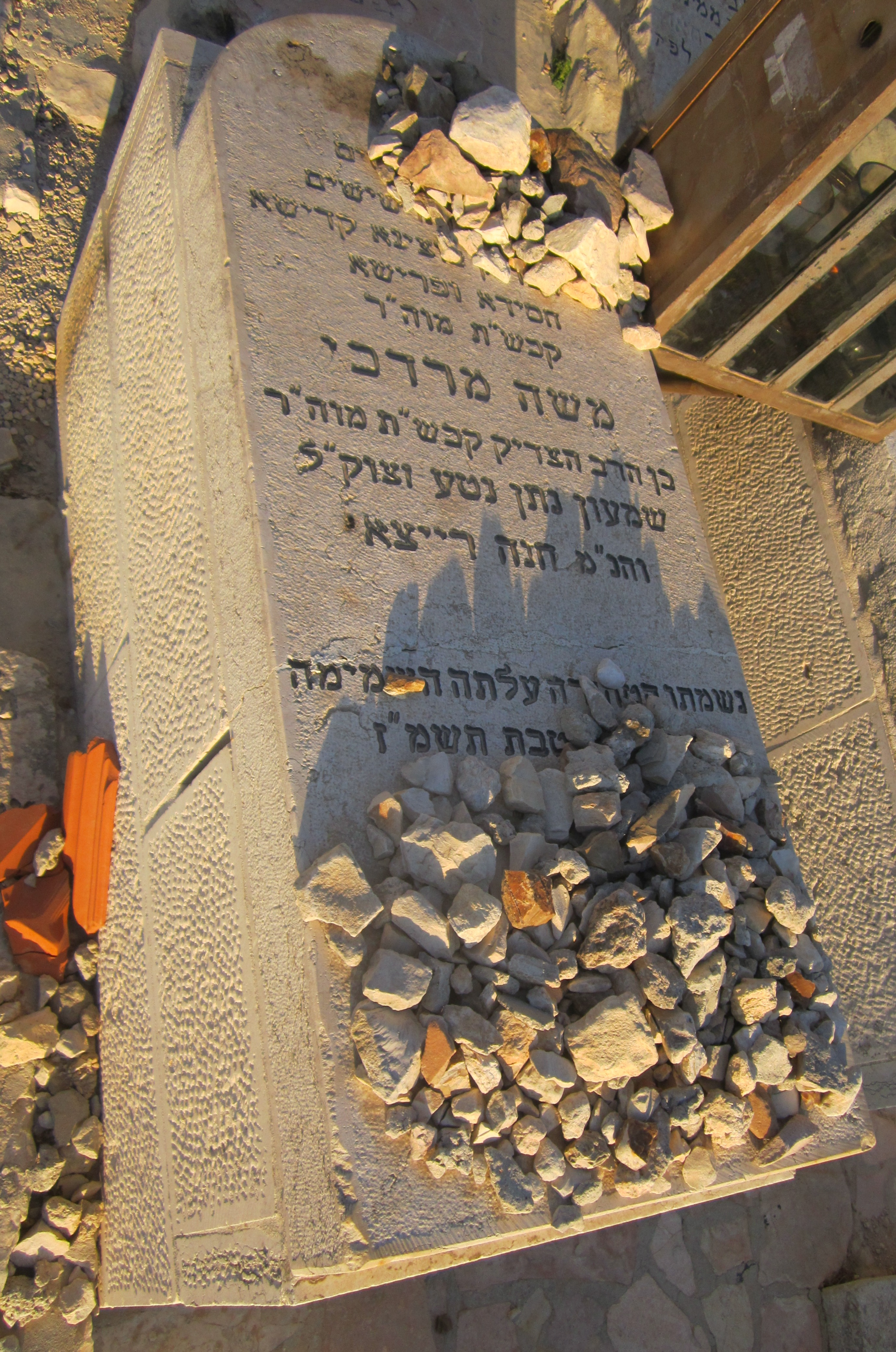
Tomb of Rabbi Moshe Mordechai on the Mount of Olives

== History ==
Dovid Biderman of Lelov was a disciple of the Yaakov Yitzchak, known as the Seer of Lublin.

The early Lelover rebbes (starting with Dovid Tzvi Shlomo) were followers of the Karlin (Hasidic dynasty).

== Outline of Lelover dynasty ==
- Grand Rabbi Dovid of Lelov (1746–1814)
  - Grand Rabbi Moshe Biderman of Lelov (1776–1851)
    - Grand Rabbi Eleazar Mendel Biderman of Lelov (1827–1882)
      - Grand Rabbi Dovid Tzvi Shlomo Biderman of Lelov (1844–1918)
        - Grand Rabbi Shimon Noson Nuta Biderman of Lelov (1870–1929)
          - Grand Rabbi Pinchos Chaim Biderman of Lelov
            - Grand Rabbi Moshe Mordechai Biderman of Lelov and Karlin (1903–1987).
              - Grand Rabbi Shimon Noson Nuta Biderman of Lelov (1931 - 2009).
                - Grand Rabbi Avrohom Shlomo Biderman of Lelov-Jerusalem (Zephania Street) (1927–2000).
                  - Grand Rabbi Alter Elozor Menachem Biderman of Lelov in Bnei Brak (1935–2001).
                    - Grand Rabbi Aaron Biderman of Lelov (current)

== See also ==
- History of the Jews in Poland
- Boston (Hasidic dynasty)
