= Bichniów =

- Village
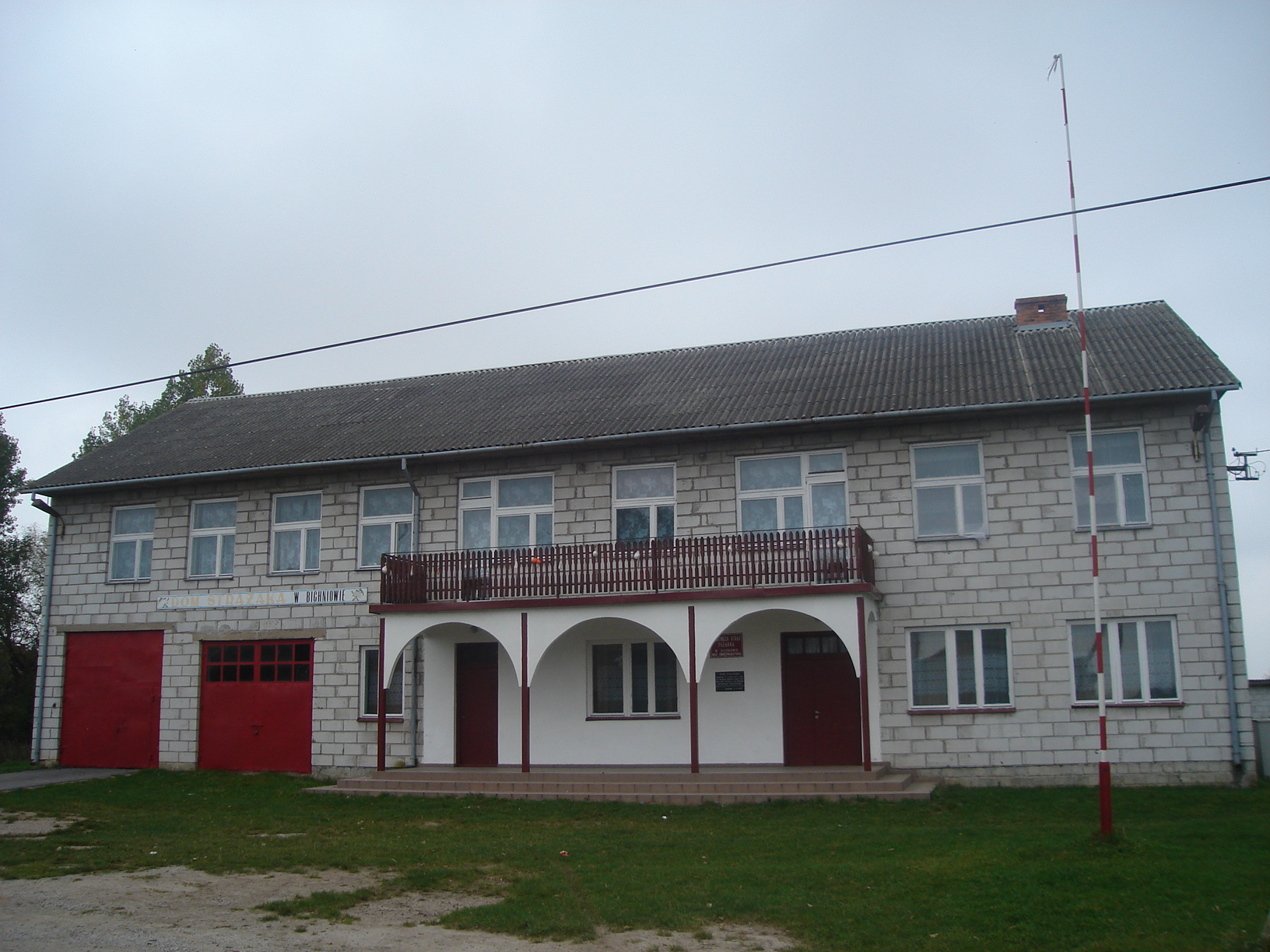
- Fire station

- Location within Poland
- Coordinates: 50°45′7″N 19°52′1″E
- Country: Poland
- Voivodeship: Świętokrzyskie
- County: Włoszczowa
- Gmina: Secemin
- Population: 270

Bichniów [ˈbixɲuf] is a village in the administrative district of Gmina Secemin, within Włoszczowa County, Świętokrzyskie Voivodeship, in south-central Poland. It lies approximately 3 km (2 mi) south-east of Secemin, 14 km (9 mi) south-west of Włoszczowa, and 55 km (34 mi) west of the regional capital Kielce.
