= Kazimierz Boratyński =

Polish chemist

Kazimierz Boratyński (Polish pronunciation: [kaˈʑi.mjɛʂ bɔratɨɲski]; July 30, 1906, in Gródek – December 8, 1991, in Wrocław) was a Polish chemist. He specialized in the field of soil science.

In his research work, he dealt with the chemistry of mineral fertilizers, soil chemistry and physics, humus processes in soil, and soil geography. He was awarded an honorary doctorate by Wrocław University of Environmental and Life Sciences in 1986.

== Publications ==
- O kwasach metafosforowych (1932)
- Metafosforany i pirofosforany jako źródło fosforu dla roślin (1933)
- O odmianach pięciotlenku fosforu (1933)
- Badania nad próchnicą (1962–1965)
- Wpływ nawożenia na związki próchnicze gleby lekkiej (1968)
