= Dąbie =

Dąbie may refer to:

- Dąbie, Greater Poland Voivodeship, a town in central Poland
- Dąbie, Szczecin, a neighborhood of Szczecin in northwest Poland, south of Dąbie Lake
- Dąbie Lake (Jezioro Dąbie or Jezioro Dąbskie), a lake in Szczecin in the delta of the Odra river
- Dąbie, part of the Grzegórzki district of Kraków
- Dąbie, Legnica County in Lower Silesian Voivodeship (south-west Poland)
- Dąbie, Wołów County in Lower Silesian Voivodeship (south-west Poland)
- Dąbie, Inowrocław County in Kuyavian-Pomeranian Voivodeship (north-central Poland)
- Dąbie, Sępólno County in Kuyavian-Pomeranian Voivodeship (north-central Poland)
- Dąbie, Janów County in Lublin Voivodeship (east Poland)
- Dąbie, Krasnystaw County in Lublin Voivodeship (east Poland)
- Dąbie, Gmina Bytów in Pomeranian Voivodeship (north Poland)
- Dąbie, Gmina Czarna Dąbrówka in Pomeranian Voivodeship (north Poland)
- Dąbie, Łęczyca County in Łódź Voivodeship (central Poland)
- Dąbie, Opoczno County in Łódź Voivodeship (central Poland)
- Dąbie, Wieruszów County in Łódź Voivodeship (central Poland)
- Dąbie, Łuków County in Lublin Voivodeship (east Poland)
- Dąbie, Lesser Poland Voivodeship (south Poland)
- Dąbie, Subcarpathian Voivodeship (south-east Poland)
- Dąbie, Sandomierz County in Świętokrzyskie Voivodeship (south-central Poland)
- Dąbie, Gmina Włoszczowa in Świętokrzyskie Voivodeship (south-central Poland)
- Dąbie, Gmina Secemin in Świętokrzyskie Voivodeship (south-central Poland)
- Dąbie, Silesian Voivodeship (south Poland)
- Dąbie, Lubusz Voivodeship (west Poland)
- Dąbie, Warmian-Masurian Voivodeship (north Poland)
- Dąbie, Gryfice County in West Pomeranian Voivodeship (north-west Poland)
- Dąbie, Szczecinek County in West Pomeranian Voivodeship (north-west Poland)

== See also ==
- Dabie Mountains
