= Pniaki, Świętokrzyskie Voivodeship =

Pniaki
- Village
- Location within Poland
- Coordinates: 50°46′29″N 19°47′17″E
- Country: Poland
- Voivodeship: Świętokrzyskie
- County: Włoszczowa
- Gmina: Secemin

Pniaki [ˈpɲaki] is a village in the administrative district of Gmina Secemin, within Włoszczowa County, Świętokrzyskie Voivodeship, in south-central Poland. It lies approximately 4 km (2 mi) west of Secemin, 16 km (10 mi) south-west of Włoszczowa, and 60 km (37 mi) west of the regional capital Kielce.
