= Wolica, Gmina Secemin =

Wolica
- Village
- Location within Poland
- Coordinates: 50°43′13″N 19°45′47″E
- Country: Poland
- Voivodeship: Świętokrzyskie
- County: Włoszczowa
- Gmina: Secemin

Wolica [vɔˈlit͡sa] is a village in the administrative district of Gmina Secemin, within Włoszczowa County, Świętokrzyskie Voivodeship, in south-central Poland. It lies approximately 8 km (5 mi) south-west of Secemin, 21 km (13 mi) south-west of Włoszczowa, and 63 km (39 mi) west of the regional capital Kielce.
