= Żelisławiczki =

- Village
- Location within Poland
- Coordinates: 50°48′21″N 19°52′42″E
- Country: Poland
- Voivodeship: Świętokrzyskie
- County: Włoszczowa
- Gmina: Secemin
- Population: 310

Żelisławiczki [ʐɛliswaˈvit͡ʂki] is a village in the administrative district of Gmina Secemin, within Włoszczowa County, Świętokrzyskie Voivodeship, in south-central Poland. It lies approximately 6 km (4 mi) north-east of Secemin, 9 km (6 mi) south-west of Włoszczowa, and 53 km (33 mi) west of the regional capital Kielce.
