= Dabi =

Dabi may refer to:

== People ==
- Frédéric Dabi (born 1969), French political analyst; see 2019 European Parliament election in France
- Mohammed Ahmed Mustafa al-Dabi (born 1948), Sudanese military commander
- Snehal Dabi (born 1977), Indian actor
- Tina Dabi (born 1993), Indian Administrative Service officer

== Other ==
- Dabi, India
- Dabi language
- Dabi, a character in My Hero Academia

== See also ==
- Dąbie (disambiguation)
