= Kuczków, Świętokrzyskie Voivodeship =

Kuczków
- Village
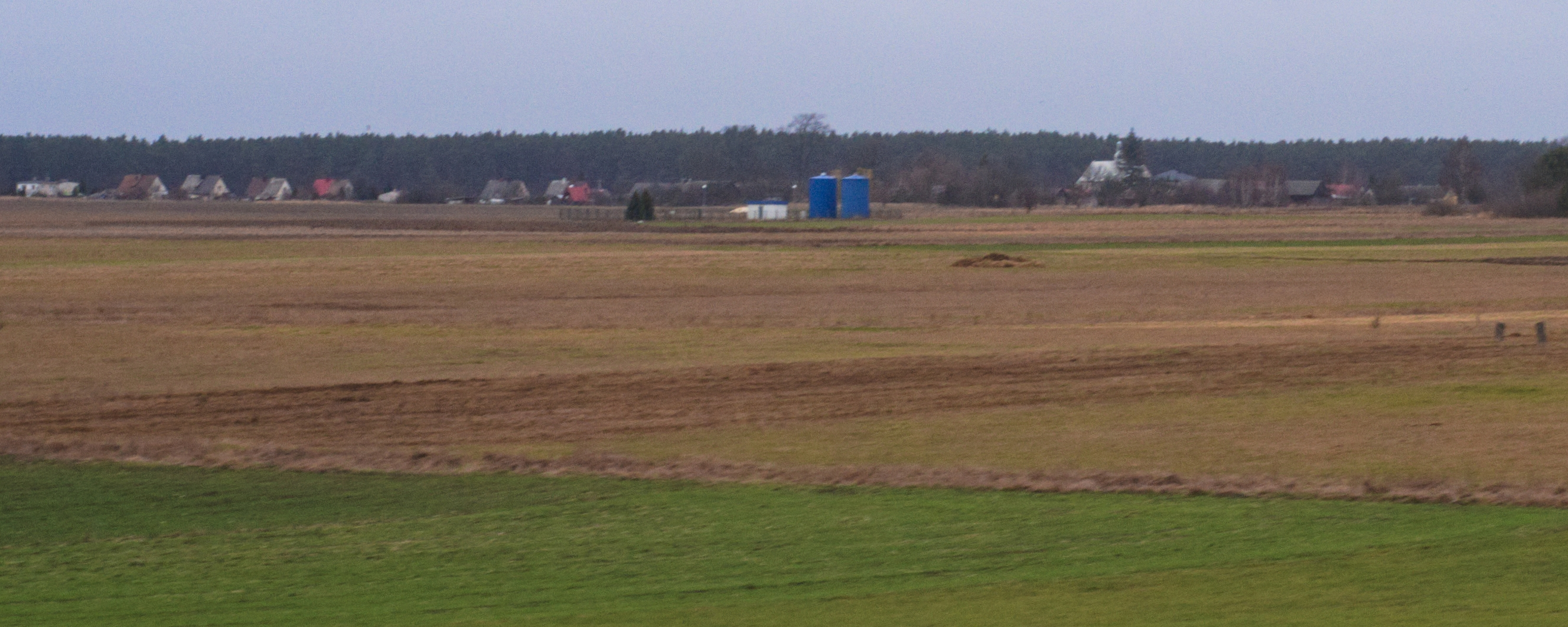
- Kuczków in 2020

- Location within Poland
- Coordinates: 50°43′38″N 19°45′4″E
- Country: Poland
- Voivodeship: Świętokrzyskie
- County: Włoszczowa
- Gmina: Secemin
- Population: 230

Kuczków [ˈkut͡ʂkuf] is a village in the administrative district of Gmina Secemin, within Włoszczowa County, Świętokrzyskie Voivodeship, in south-central Poland. It lies approximately 8 km (5 mi) south-west of Secemin, 21 km (13 mi) south-west of Włoszczowa, and 64 km (40 mi) west of the regional capital Kielce.
