= Asher Rabinowicz of Przedbórz =

Hasidic Maggid

Asher ben Elhanan Rabinowicz of Przedbórz (Yiddish: אשר ראבינאוויטש פון פשעדבאָרז; c. 1720 – January 20, 1798) also known as the Maggid of Przedbórz was an 18th-century Hasidic Maggid (preacher).

Born in Grojec, Poland to a notable rabbinic family. His father Rabbi Elhanan ben Yitzchak Rabinowicz was the material grandson of Isaac HaLevi Segal, who in part was the great-grandson of Eliezer Treves of Frankfurt. In his early years, Asher served as the Av Beit Din of Przedbórz, where he married his wife Moteil, who gave birth to his son, Yaakov Yitzchak Rabinowicz in 1766. Following this, Asher began to give sermons across Poland, later being appointed as Rabbi of Grodzisk, where he died on January 20, 1798. He is the grandfather of Yerachmiel Rabinowicz of Peshischa, great-grandfather of Natan David Rabinowitz, founder of Biala Hasidism.
