= Wałkonowy Górne =

- Village
- Location within Poland
- Coordinates: 50°45′29″N 19°54′23″E
- Country: Poland
- Voivodeship: Świętokrzyskie
- County: Włoszczowa
- Gmina: Secemin
- Population: 80

Wałkonowy Górne [vau̯kɔˈnɔvɨ ˈɡurnɛ] is a village in the administrative district of Gmina Secemin, within Włoszczowa County, Świętokrzyskie Voivodeship, in south-central Poland. It lies approximately 5 km (3 mi) east of Secemin, 12 km (7 mi) south of Włoszczowa, and 52 km (32 mi) west of the regional capital Kielce.
