= Zwlecza =

- Village
- Location within Poland
- Coordinates: 50°44′40″N 19°48′47″E
- Country: Poland
- Voivodeship: Świętokrzyskie
- County: Włoszczowa
- Gmina: Secemin
- Population: 80

Zwlecza [ˈzvlɛt͡ʂa] is a village in the administrative district of Gmina Secemin, within Włoszczowa County, Świętokrzyskie Voivodeship, in south-central Poland. It lies approximately 4 km (2 mi) south-west of Secemin, 17 km (11 mi) south-west of Włoszczowa, and 59 km (37 mi) west of the regional capital Kielce.
