= Miny =

- Village
- Location within Poland
- Coordinates: 50°48′21″N 19°53′57″E
- Country: Poland
- Voivodeship: Świętokrzyskie
- County: Włoszczowa
- Gmina: Secemin

Miny [ˈminɨ] is a village in the administrative district of Gmina Secemin, within Włoszczowa County, Świętokrzyskie Voivodeship, in south-central Poland. It lies approximately 7 km (4 mi) north-east of Secemin, 8 km (5 mi) south-west of Włoszczowa, and 52 km (32 mi) west of the regional capital Kielce.
