= Kluczyce =

- Village
- Location within Poland
- Coordinates: 50°44′1″N 19°47′54″E
- Country: Poland
- Voivodeship: Świętokrzyskie
- County: Włoszczowa
- Gmina: Secemin
- Population: 120

Kluczyce [kluˈt͡ʂɨt͡sɛ] is a village in the administrative district of Gmina Secemin, within Włoszczowa County, Świętokrzyskie Voivodeship, in south-central Poland. It lies approximately 5 km (3 mi) south-west of Secemin, 18 km (11 mi) south-west of Włoszczowa, and 60 km (37 mi) west of the regional capital Kielce.
