= Lipiny, Włoszczowa County =

Lipiny
- Settlement
- Location within Poland
- Coordinates: 50°44′36″N 19°54′13″E
- Country: Poland
- Voivodeship: Świętokrzyskie
- County: Włoszczowa
- Gmina: Secemin

Lipiny [liˈpinɨ] is a settlement in the administrative district of Gmina Secemin, within Włoszczowa County, Świętokrzyskie Voivodeship, in south-central Poland. It lies approximately 6 km (4 mi) south-east of Secemin, 14 km (9 mi) south of Włoszczowa, and 53 km (33 mi) west of the regional capital Kielce.
