= Nadolnik =

Nadolnik may refer to the following places:

- Nadolnik, part of the Nowe Miasto district of Poznań
- Nadolnik, Chodzież County in Greater Poland Voivodeship (west-central Poland)
- Nadolnik, Kuyavian-Pomeranian Voivodeship (north-central Poland)
- Nadolnik, Świętokrzyskie Voivodeship (south-central Poland)
- Nadolnik, Kościan County in Greater Poland Voivodeship (west-central Poland)
- Nadolnik, Leszno County in Greater Poland Voivodeship (west-central Poland)
- Nadolnik, Szamotuły County in Greater Poland Voivodeship (west-central Poland)
