= Brzozowa, Włoszczowa County =

Brzozowa
- Village
- Location within Poland
- Coordinates: 50°45′46″N 19°48′39″E
- Country: Poland
- Voivodeship: Świętokrzyskie
- County: Włoszczowa
- Gmina: Secemin
- Population: 290

Brzozowa [bʐɔˈzɔva] is a village in the administrative district of Gmina Secemin, in Włoszczowa County, Świętokrzyskie Voivodeship, in south-central Poland. It lies approximately 3 km (2 mi) west of Secemin, 15 km (9 mi) south-west of Włoszczowa, and 59 km (37 mi) west of the regional capital Kielce.
