= Krzepin =

- Village
- Location within Poland
- Coordinates: 50°45′7″N 19°56′51″E
- Country: Poland
- Voivodeship: Świętokrzyskie
- County: Włoszczowa
- Gmina: Secemin
- Population: 110

Krzepin [ˈkʂɛpin] is a village in the administrative district of Gmina Secemin, within Włoszczowa County, Świętokrzyskie Voivodeship, in south-central Poland. It lies approximately 8 km (5 mi) east of Secemin, 12 km (7 mi) south of Włoszczowa, and 50 km (31 mi) west of the regional capital Kielce.
