= Krzepice (disambiguation) =

Krzepice is a town in Kłobuck County, Silesian Voivodeship, Poland.

Krzepice may also refer to:

- Krzepice, Lower Silesian Voivodeship (south-west Poland)
- Krzepice, Świętokrzyskie Voivodeship (south-central Poland)
