= Celiny, Włoszczowa County =

Celiny
- Village
- Location within Poland
- Coordinates: 50°42′46″N 19°49′38″E
- Country: Poland
- Voivodeship: Świętokrzyskie
- County: Włoszczowa
- Gmina: Secemin
- Population: 100

Celiny [t͡sɛˈlinɨ] is a village in the administrative district of Gmina Secemin, within Włoszczowa County, Świętokrzyskie Voivodeship, in south-central Poland. It lies approximately 7 km (4 mi) south of Secemin, 19 km (12 mi) south-west of Włoszczowa, and 59 km (37 mi) west of the regional capital Kielce.
