= Gabrielów, Świętokrzyskie Voivodeship =

Gabrielów
- Village
- Location within Poland
- Coordinates: 50°45′58″N 19°46′59″E
- Country: Poland
- Voivodeship: Świętokrzyskie
- County: Włoszczowa
- Gmina: Secemin

Gabrielów [ɡaˈbrjɛluf] is a village in the administrative district of Gmina Secemin, within Włoszczowa County, Świętokrzyskie Voivodeship, in south-central Poland. It lies approximately 4 km (2 mi) west of Secemin, 17 km (11 mi) south-west of Włoszczowa, and 61 km (38 mi) west of the regional capital Kielce.
