= Boczkowice =

Boczkowice refers to the following places in Poland:

- Boczkowice, Lesser Poland Voivodeship
- Boczkowice, Świętokrzyskie Voivodeship
