= Ropocice =

- Village
- Location within Poland
- Coordinates: 50°46′26″N 19°53′31″E
- Country: Poland
- Voivodeship: Świętokrzyskie
- County: Włoszczowa
- Gmina: Secemin
- Population: 40

Ropocice [rɔpɔˈt͡ɕit͡sɛ] is a village in the administrative district of Gmina Secemin, within Włoszczowa County, Świętokrzyskie Voivodeship, in south-central Poland. It lies approximately 4 km (2 mi) east of Secemin, 11 km (7 mi) south-west of Włoszczowa, and 53 km (33 mi) west of the regional capital Kielce.
