= Wola Wiśniowa =

Wola Wiśniowa (Buraki)
- Village
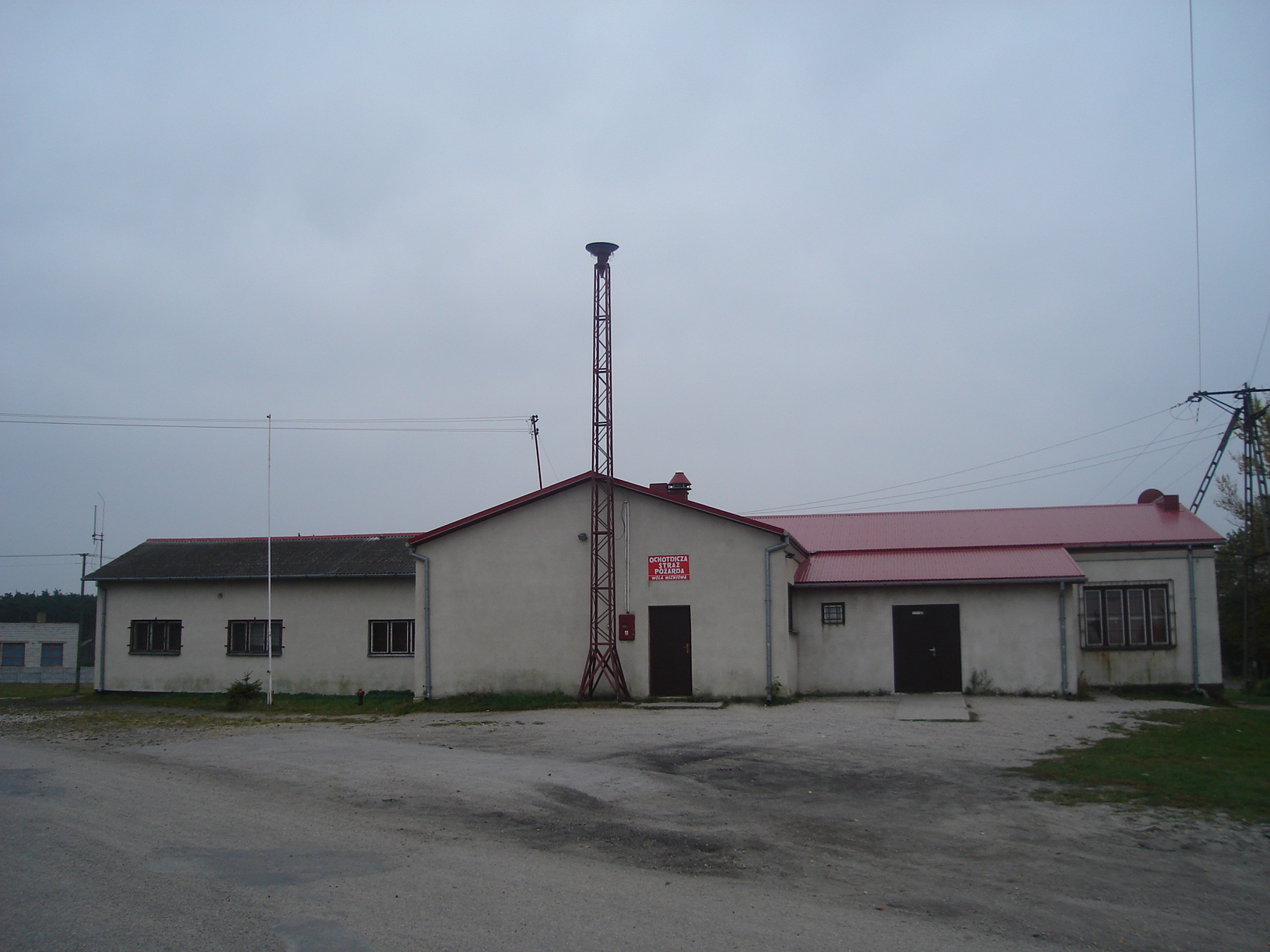

- Location within Poland
- Coordinates: 50°49′28″N 19°59′13″E
- Country: Poland
- Voivodeship: Świętokrzyskie
- County: Włoszczowa
- Gmina: Włoszczowa

Wola Wiśniowa [ˈvɔla viɕˈɲɔva] is a village in the administrative district of Gmina Włoszczowa, within Włoszczowa County, Świętokrzyskie Voivodeship, in south-central Poland. It lies approximately 4 km (2 mi) south-east of Włoszczowa and 45 km (28 mi) west of the regional capital Kielce.
