= Kąty, Włoszczowa County =

Kąty
- Village
- Location within Poland
- Coordinates: 50°48′11″N 19°57′24″E
- Country: Poland
- Voivodeship: Świętokrzyskie
- County: Włoszczowa
- Gmina: Włoszczowa

Kąty [ˈkɔntɨ] is a village in the administrative district of Gmina Włoszczowa, within Włoszczowa County, Świętokrzyskie Voivodeship, in south-central Poland. It lies approximately 6 km (4 mi) south of Włoszczowa and 48 km (30 mi) west of the regional capital Kielce.
