= Danków Mały =

- Village
- Location within Poland
- Coordinates: 50°52′N 19°56′E
- Country: Poland
- Voivodeship: Świętokrzyskie
- County: Włoszczowa
- Gmina: Włoszczowa

Danków Mały [ˈdankuf ˈmawɨ] is a village in the administrative district of Gmina Włoszczowa, within Włoszczowa County, Świętokrzyskie Voivodeship, in south-central Poland. It lies approximately 3 km (2 mi) north-west of Włoszczowa and 49 km (30 mi) west of the regional capital Kielce.
