= Dovid Biderman =

Polish Rabbi (1746-1814)

Rabbi Dovid Biderman
- Title: Lelover Rebbe

Personal life
- Born: 1745 Lelów, Poland
- Died: January 28, 1814 (aged 59–60) Lelów, Poland
- Buried: Lelów, Poland
- Spouse: Chana
- Dynasty: Lelov

Religious life
- Religion: Judaism

Jewish leader
- Successor: Rabbi Moshe Biderman (son-in-law of Rabbi Yaakov Yitzchak Rabinowicz)
- Yahrtzeit: 7 Shevat (5574)
- Dynasty: Lelov

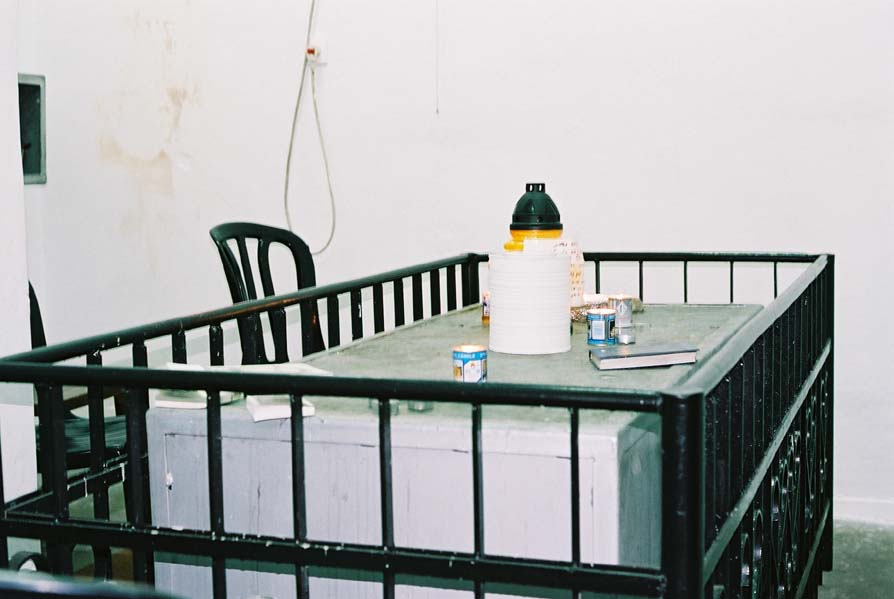
Tombstone of Reb Dovid of Lelov

Grand Rabbi Dovid Biderman (1746-1814) of Lelów was the founder of the Lelov Hassidic dynasty. He is commonly referred to as "Reb Dovid Lelover".

== Biography ==
Rabbi Dovid of Lelov was a disciple of the Seer of Lublin, a disciple of Rabbi Elimelech of Lizhensk, who was a disciple of the Magid of Mezritsh, the successor to and leading disciple of the Baal Shem Tov, the founder of Hasidism.

There is a Hasidic legend that Napoleon Bonaparte asked Rabbi Dovid of Lelov if he would be successful in his conquest of Russia. The rebbe told the Emperor that he would not. After Napoleon's defeat, he allegedly passed through Lelov and told the Rebbe that he was indeed correct. He then gave the Rebbe his velvet cloak. The Hasidim say that Rabbi Moshe of Lelov, the son of Rabbi Dovid, took the cloak to Jerusalem with him, and made the cover for the Holy Ark in his synagogue from it.
