= Silpia Mała =

- Village
- Location within Poland
- Coordinates: 50°52′N 19°48′E
- Country: Poland
- Voivodeship: Świętokrzyskie
- County: Włoszczowa
- Gmina: Włoszczowa

Silpia Mała [ˈɕilpja ˈmawa] is a village in the administrative district of Gmina Włoszczowa, within Włoszczowa County, Świętokrzyskie Voivodeship, in south-central Poland. It lies approximately 12 km (7 mi) west of Włoszczowa and 58 km (36 mi) west of the regional capital Kielce.
