= Kuzki =

- Village
- Location within Poland
- Coordinates: 50°49′32″N 19°57′18″E
- Country: Poland
- Voivodeship: Świętokrzyskie
- County: Włoszczowa
- Gmina: Włoszczowa

Kuzki [ˈkuski] is a village in the administrative district of Gmina Włoszczowa, within Włoszczowa County, Świętokrzyskie Voivodeship, in south-central Poland. It lies approximately 4 km (2 mi) south of Włoszczowa and 47 km (29 mi) west of the regional capital Kielce.
