= Bebelno-Wieś =

- Village
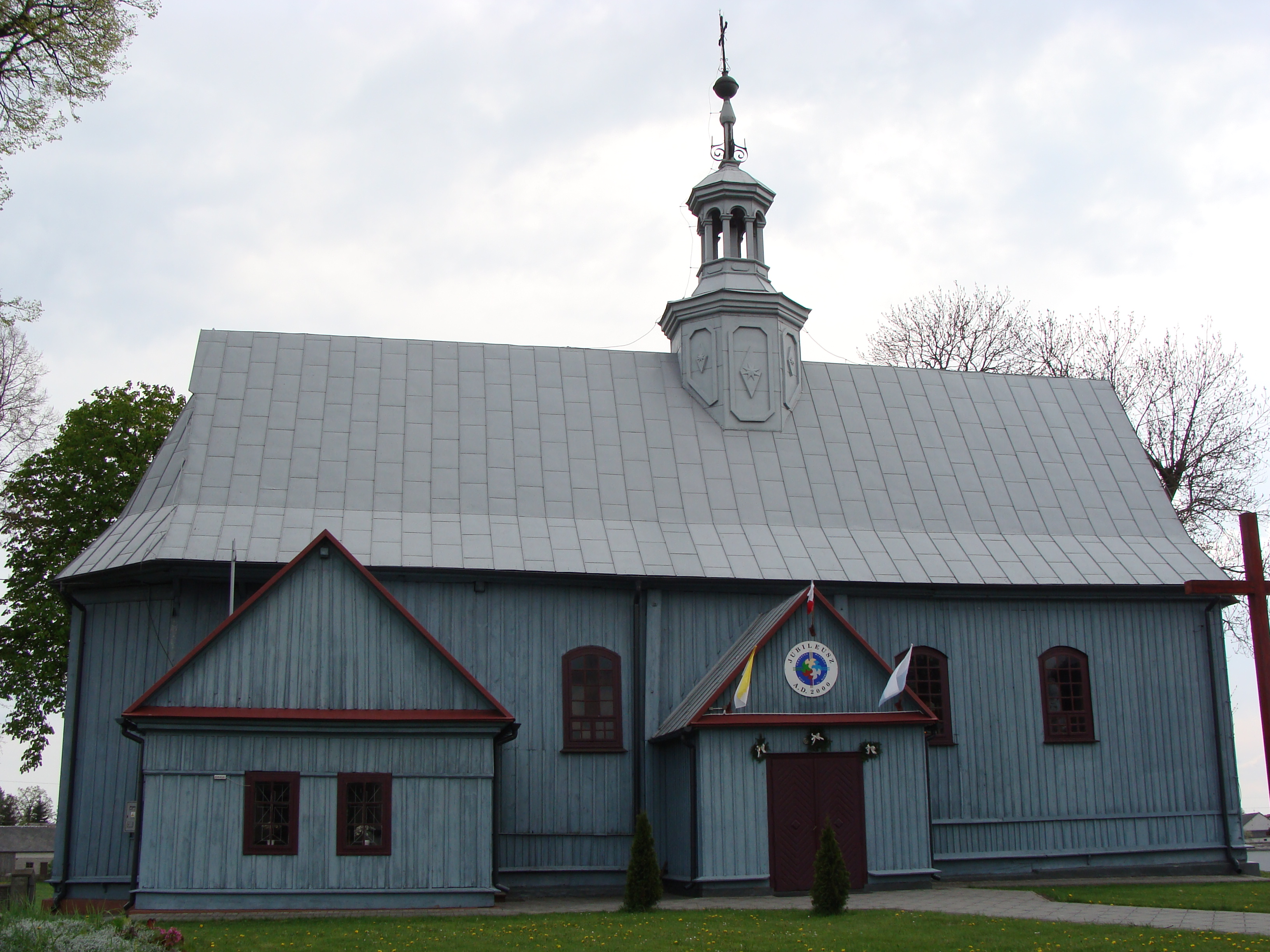
- Saint Mary church

- Location within Poland
- Coordinates: 50°45′23″N 19°59′4″E
- Country: Poland
- Voivodeship: Świętokrzyskie
- County: Włoszczowa
- Gmina: Włoszczowa
- Population: 468
- Website: http://wojtek.onlinesc.net/bebelno/

Bebelno-Wieś [bɛˈbɛlnɔ ˈvjɛɕ] is a village in the administrative district of Gmina Włoszczowa, within Włoszczowa County, Świętokrzyskie Voivodeship, in south-central Poland. It lies approximately 11 km (7 mi) south of Włoszczowa and 47 km (29 mi) west of the regional capital Kielce.
