= Konieczno =

- Village
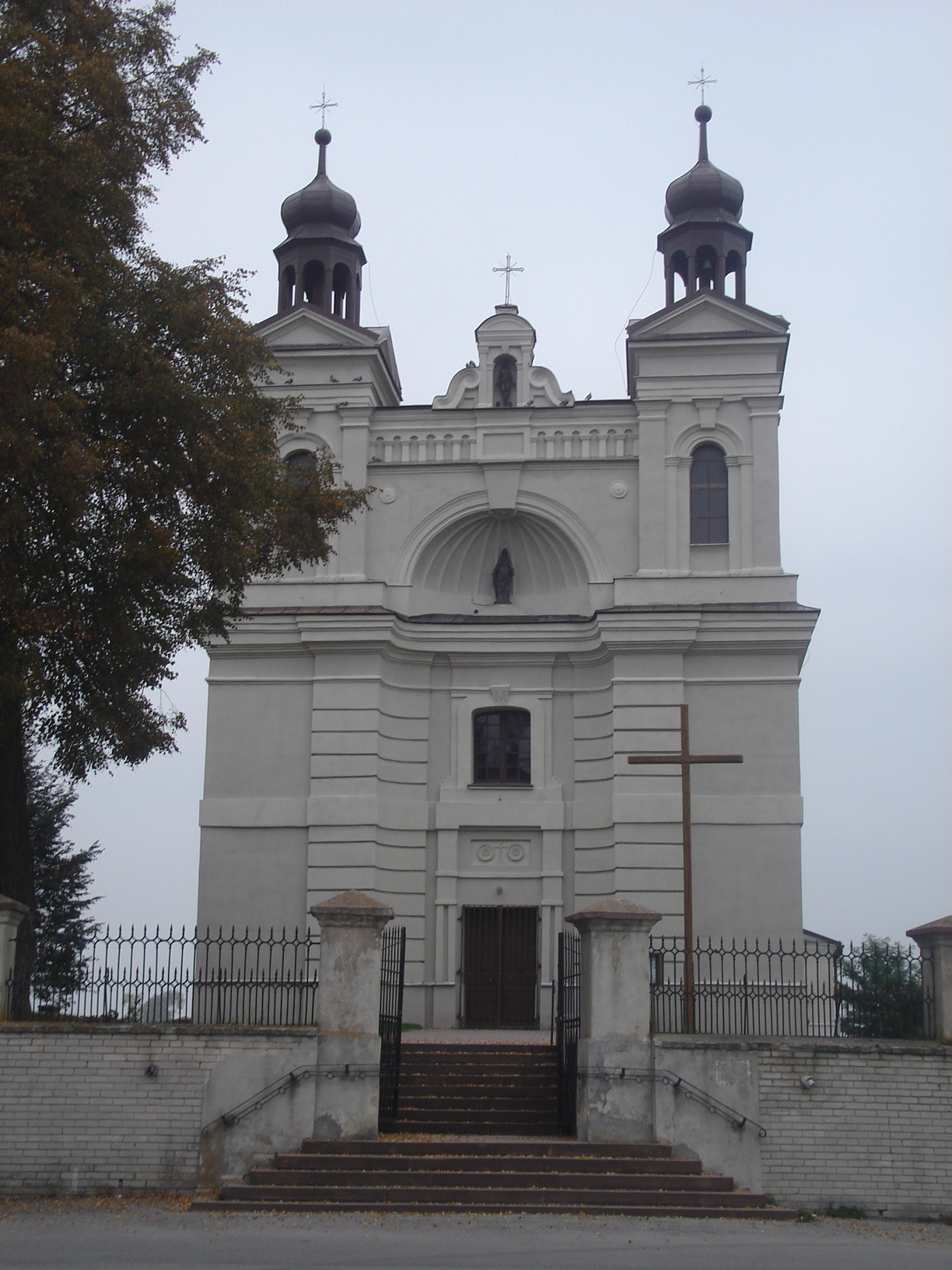
- Visitation church

- Location within Poland
- Coordinates: 50°47′28″N 20°2′0″E
- Country: Poland
- Voivodeship: Świętokrzyskie
- County: Włoszczowa
- Gmina: Włoszczowa
- Highest elevation: 280 m (920 ft)
- Lowest elevation: 250 m (820 ft)
- Population: 1,200
- Website: http://www.konieczno.cba.pl/

Konieczno [kɔˈɲɛt͡ʂnɔ] is a village in the administrative district of Gmina Włoszczowa, within Włoszczowa County, Świętokrzyskie Voivodeship, in south-central Poland. It lies approximately 9 km (6 mi) south-east of Włoszczowa and 43 km (27 mi) west of the regional capital Kielce.
