= Gościencin =

- Village
- Location within Poland
- Coordinates: 50°53′46″N 19°48′2″E
- Country: Poland
- Voivodeship: Świętokrzyskie
- County: Włoszczowa
- Gmina: Włoszczowa
- Population: 350

Gościencin (Polish pronunciation: [ɡɔɕˈt͡ɕɛnt͡ɕin]) is a village in the administrative district of Gmina Włoszczowa, within Włoszczowa County, Świętokrzyskie Voivodeship, in south-central Poland. It lies approximately 13 km (8 mi) west of Włoszczowa and 58 km (36 mi) west of the regional capital Kielce.
