= Podłazie, Włoszczowa County =

Podłazie
- Village
- Location within Poland
- Coordinates: 50°43′50″N 20°2′24″E
- Country: Poland
- Voivodeship: Świętokrzyskie
- County: Włoszczowa
- Gmina: Włoszczowa

Podłazie [pɔdˈwaʑɛ] is a village in the administrative district of Gmina Włoszczowa, within Włoszczowa County, Świętokrzyskie Voivodeship, in south-central Poland. It lies approximately 15 km (9 mi) south of Włoszczowa and 44 km (27 mi) south-west of the regional capital Kielce.
