= Nosson Dovid Rabinowich =

American Jewish history scholar

Nosson Dovid Rabinowich is an American scholar of classical and medieval Jewish history former Dean of Ahavath Torah Institute in Brooklyn, New York. He is a descendant of Nathan David Rabinowich of Shidlowce and is a modern advocate of "the theory of the two Jesuses." In February 2013 he was arrested for attempting to lure a child for sex.

== Selected published books ==
- M. Mielziner's Talmudic Terminology adapted by Rabbi Nosson Dovid Rabinowich
  - This book was formerly published as Talmudic Terminology, having been plagiarized from Moses Mielziner's Introduction to the Talmud (1894) as was noted in brief by Rabbi Dr. Marc B. Shapiro. Shortly after publication, the book was reprinted (1988) with its title page identifying it as an adaptation from M. Mielziner, along with some small changes, and concurrently, the approbations by Rabbis Ovadia Yosef and Aharon Feldman were removed. In the second edition (revised and expanded, 1996) however, the approbations were reinstated and other changes were made including mention of Mielziner on the inside title page (similar to the reprinted first edition) but no longer on the book's front cover; on the back cover, explicit mention of the book being "an adaptation of one section in Mielziner's book" (i.e., part III); and the omission of chapter 12.
- English Translation of "The Iggeres of Rav Sherira Gaon"
- R. Natan David Rabinowitz, בִּינוּ שְׁנוֹת דּוֹר־וָדוֹר (Binu shenot dor-va-dor, "consider the years of many generations") 1984
- Be’airot Natan, (Hebrew), Bar Nedorai Publications, Bnei Brak, 1980 (Novellae on Seder Moed and Seder Kodashim)
- Ve’eleh Ha’Dvorim She’nemru L’Dovid, (Hebrew), Bar Nedorai Publications, Jerusalem, 1983 (Hassidic Work)
- Binu Shnot Dor Vador: Studies in Jewish History and Talmudic Literature in The Second Commonwealth Period, (Hebrew), Feldheim Publications, Jerusalem, 1985
- The Iggeret of Rav Sherira Gaon, (English), Moznaim Publications, Jerusalem, 1988 (first-ever English translation)
- Talmudic Terminology, (English), Moznaim Publications, Jerusalem, 1987, 1988. (an adaptation of M. Meilziner's classic)
- The Iggeret of Rav Sherira Gaon, (Hebrew), Moznaim Publications, Jerusalem, 1991.(first-ever Hebrew translation)
- Second Letter of Rav Sherira Gaon, (Hebrew), New York, 1992.
- The Responsa of Rav Sherira ben Chanina Gaon, (Hebrew), Vol. I, Jerusalem, 1999.
- Talmudic Terminology, (New and Revised 3rd Edition), (English), Moznaim Publications, Jerusalem, 1996.
- Safra V’Saifa, The Battle of the Chasam Sofer against Early Reform Judaism (Hebrew), Ahavath Torah Institute, Jerusalem, 2003 (First edition); Jerusalem, 2004 (Second edition), 2005 (Third edition)
- Reshimat Teshuvot Rav Sherira Gaon (Hebrew), Ahavath Torah Institute, New York, 2007

== Selected Recent Articles ==
- (2002–2003): Weekly contributor to the Jewish Press, largest Jewish weekly in America
- "The Battle of Moses Sofer of Pressburg Against Reform Judaism" (1) (Hebrew), Ohr Yisroel, 24, 198–208, December, 2001
- “The Battle of Moses Sofer of Pressburg Against Reform Judaism (2),” (Hebrew), Ohr Yisroel, 25, pp. 199–204; August, 2001,
- “Chapters in the Chasam Sofer’s Battle Against the Innovators,” (Hebrew), Ha’Mayyan, 42, pp. 11–17, May, 2001
- “More on the Eruv Controversy,” (Hebrew), Kerem B’Yavneh, 5, pp. 203–204, April 2001
- “Identifying the ‘Rav Ha’Chovel’ in Tosafot, Megilla 31b,” (Hebrew), Sinai, 268-269, pp. 34-3, January 2001
- “Are We Teaching Chumash Correctly to our Children?,” Hakirah, 1 (Fall 2004), pp. 25–39
- “Was the Chasam Sofer Inconsistent?,” Hakirah, 4 ( Winter 2007), pp. 239–269
- "The Three Haftorot of Punishment; A Novel Clarification of The Rambam’s Approach” (Hebrew), Hakirah, 6 (Summer 2008), pp. 23–35
- “Biur Mechudash L’Sugyat Ha’Shas b’Masechet Succah” (Hebrew), Kovetz Etz Chaim 7(2009), pp. 295–303
- B'ma'bat L'achor: Kamma He'arot B'Inyan "Heter" Achilat Kitniyot B'Pesach, (Hebrew), Kovetz Etz Chaim 15(2011), pp. 345–348
- Articles in every issue of “Hakovetz” [2001-2011] (quarterly publication of Agudath Yisrael of Madison):
  - The Common Practice of Erev Rosh Hashana, Erev Yom Kippur and Erev Sukkos: Visiting a Cemetery or Giving Tzedakah ?
  - Interesting Insights into the Torah and Haftarah readings of the Upcoming Yomim Tovim
  - The Problematic Haftarah of "V'Urvah"
  - The Correct Interpretation of: שד"ש
  - Of Rambam, Happy Chanukah and Chanukah Gelt
  - Of Kitniyot, Orthodox Tradition and Reform Judaism
  - A Double Miracle: An Unknown Similarity Between Chanukah and Purim
  - Cruising Along the Halachic Way
  - The Case of the Missing Rosh Chodesh
  - Appreciating Rambam's Mishneh Torah, Hilchos Chanukah
  - A Misrepresentation of the Chasam Sofer
  - Purim: New Historical and Hashkafa Insights
  - Interesting Insights into the Rosh Hashana Mussaf
