= Nieznanowice, Świętokrzyskie Voivodeship =

Nieznanowice
- Village
- Location within Poland
- Coordinates: 50°48′59″N 20°1′47″E
- Country: Poland
- Voivodeship: Świętokrzyskie
- County: Włoszczowa
- Gmina: Włoszczowa

Nieznanowice [ɲɛznanɔˈvit͡sɛ] is a village in the administrative district of Gmina Włoszczowa, within Włoszczowa County, Świętokrzyskie Voivodeship, in south-central Poland. It lies approximately 7 km (4 mi) south-east of Włoszczowa and 42 km (26 mi) west of the regional capital Kielce.
