= Przygradów =

- Village
- Location within Poland
- Coordinates: 50°47′34″N 20°5′21″E
- Country: Poland
- Voivodeship: Świętokrzyskie
- County: Włoszczowa
- Gmina: Włoszczowa

Przygradów [pʂɨˈɡraduf] is a village in the administrative district of Gmina Włoszczowa, within Włoszczowa County, Świętokrzyskie Voivodeship, in south-central Poland. It lies approximately 11 km (7 mi) south-east of Włoszczowa and 39 km (24 mi) west of the regional capital Kielce.
