= Gmina Włoszczowa =

Gmina Włoszczowa Włoszczowa Commune
- Gmina
- Coat of arms
- Interactive map of Gmina Włoszczowa
- Coordinates (Włoszczowa): 50°51′15″N 19°58′1″E
- Country: Poland
- Voivodeship: Świętokrzyskie
- County: Włoszczowa
- Seat: Włoszczowa

Area
  - Total: 253.7 km^{2} (98.0 sq mi)

Population (2006)
  - Total: 20,426
  - Density: 80.51/km^{2} (208.5/sq mi)
  - Urban: 10,782
  - Rural: 9,644
- Postal code: 29-100
- Area code: +48 41
- Car plates: TLW
- Website: http://www.gmina-wloszczowa.pl

Gmina Włoszczowa is an urban-rural gmina (administrative district) in Włoszczowa County, Świętokrzyskie Voivodeship, in south-central Poland. Its seat is the town of Włoszczowa, which lies approximately 46 kilometres (29 mi) west of the regional capital Kielce.

The gmina covers an area of 253.7 square kilometres (98.0 sq mi), and as of 2006 its total population is 20,426 (out of which the population of Włoszczowa amounts to 10,782, and the population of the rural part of the gmina is 9,644).

== Villages ==
Apart from the town of Włoszczowa, Gmina Włoszczowa contains the villages and settlements of Bebelno-Kolonia, Bebelno-Wieś, Boczkowice, Czarnca, Dąbie, Danków Duży, Danków Mały, Gościencin, Jamskie, Jeżowice, Kąty, Konieczno, Kurzelów, Kuzki, Łachów, Ludwinów, Międzylesie, Motyczno, Nieznanowice, Ogarka, Podłazie, Przygradów, Rogienice, Rząbiec, Silpia Duża, Silpia Mała, Wola Wiśniowa and Wymysłów.

== Neighbouring gminas ==
Gmina Włoszczowa is bordered by the gminas of Kluczewsko, Koniecpol, Krasocin, Małogoszcz, Oksa, Radków, Secemin and Żytno.
