= Bebelno-Kolonia =

Bebelno-Kolonia, Poland
- Village
- Location within Poland
- Coordinates: 50°45′57″N 19°59′45″E
- Country: Poland
- Voivodeship: Świętokrzyskie
- County: Włoszczowa
- Gmina: Włoszczowa
- Population: 436
- Website: http://wojtek.onlinesc.net/bebelno/

Bebelno-Kolonia [bɛˈbɛlnɔ kɔˈlɔɲa] is a village in the administrative district of Gmina Włoszczowa, within Włoszczowa County, Świętokrzyskie Voivodeship, in south-central Poland. It lies approximately 11 km (7 mi) south of Włoszczowa and 46 km (29 mi) west of the regional capital Kielce.
