= Ogarka =

- Village
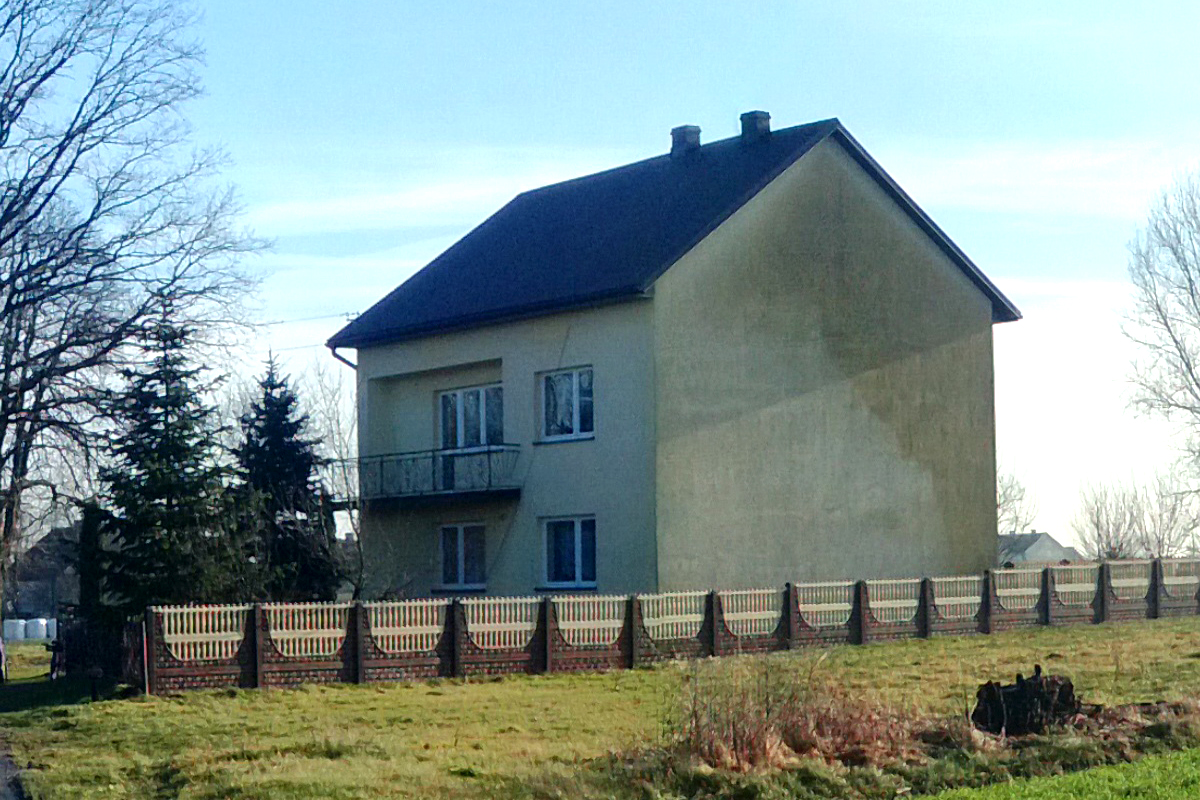

- Location within Poland
- Coordinates: 50°47′0″N 20°4′0″E
- Country: Poland
- Voivodeship: Świętokrzyskie
- County: Włoszczowa
- Gmina: Włoszczowa

Ogarka [ɔˈɡarka] is a village in the administrative district of Gmina Włoszczowa, within Włoszczowa County, Świętokrzyskie Voivodeship, in south-central Poland. It lies approximately 11 km (7 mi) south-east of Włoszczowa and 41 km (25 mi) west of the regional capital Kielce.
