= Rząbiec =

- Village
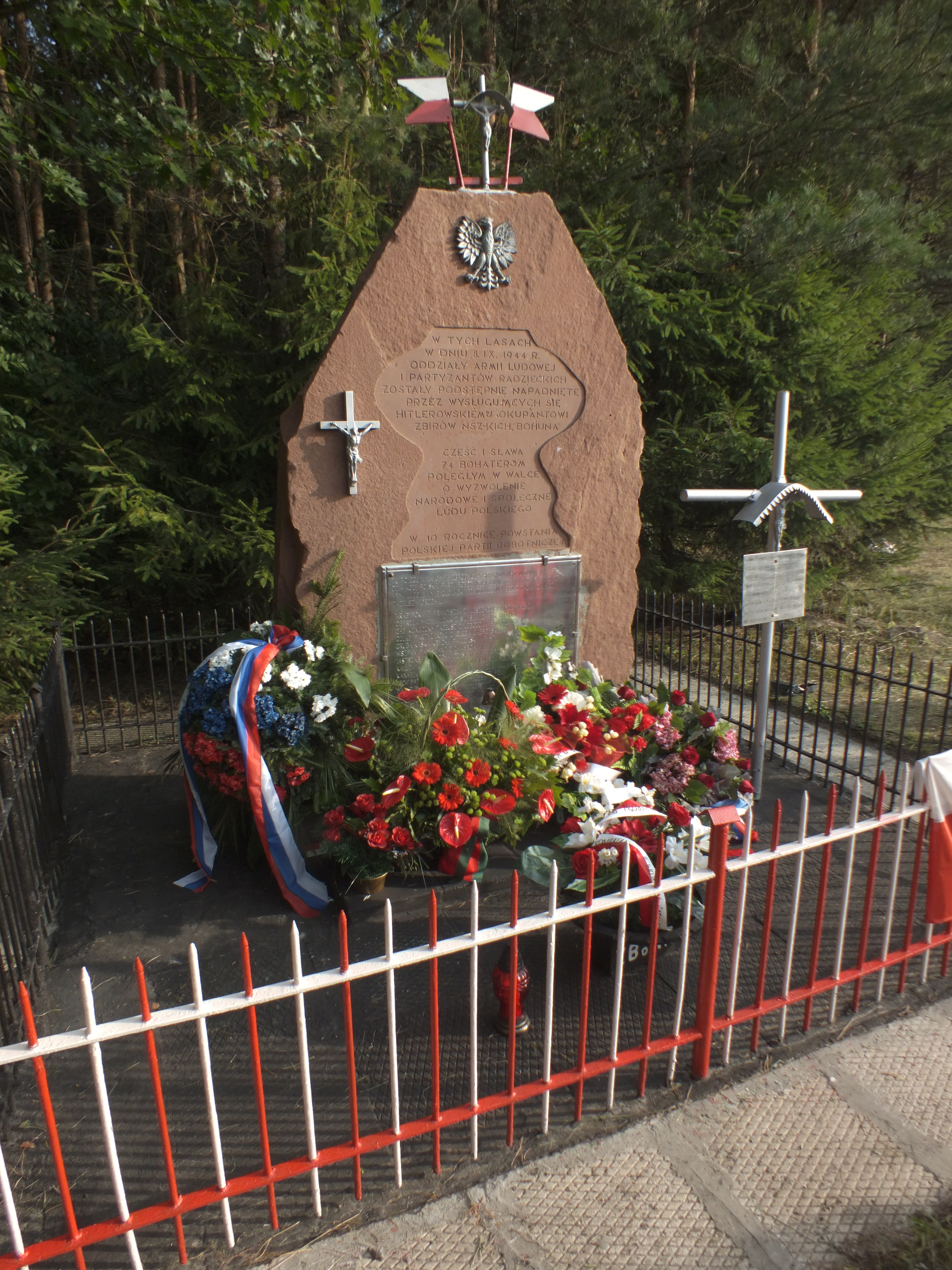

- Location within Poland
- Coordinates: 50°49′31″N 20°4′7″E
- Country: Poland
- Voivodeship: Świętokrzyskie
- County: Włoszczowa
- Gmina: Włoszczowa
- Population: 500

Rząbiec [ˈʐɔmbjɛt͡s] is a village in the administrative district of Gmina Włoszczowa, within Włoszczowa County, Świętokrzyskie Voivodeship, in south-central Poland. It lies approximately 8 km (5 mi) south-east of Włoszczowa and 40 km (25 mi) west of the regional capital Kielce.
