= Osiny, Włoszczowa County =

Osiny
- Village
- Location within Poland
- Coordinates: 50°50′38″N 19°48′40″E
- Country: Poland
- Voivodeship: Świętokrzyskie
- County: Włoszczowa
- Gmina: Secemin

Osiny [ɔˈɕinɨ] is a village in the administrative district of Gmina Secemin, within Włoszczowa County, Świętokrzyskie Voivodeship, in south-central Poland.
