= Rogienice, Świętokrzyskie Voivodeship =

Rogienice
- Village
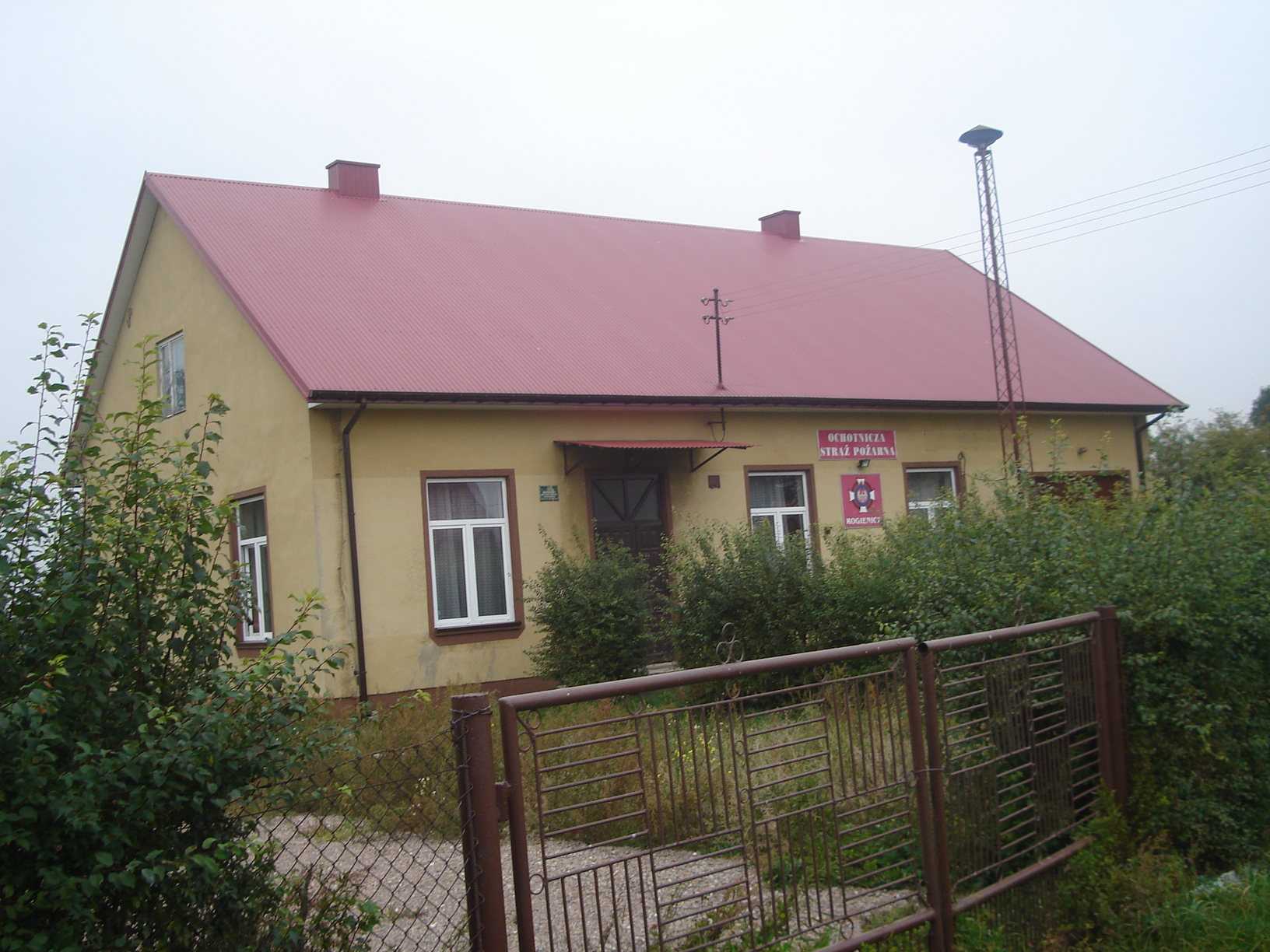
- Fire station

- Location within Poland
- Coordinates: 50°46′27″N 20°2′27″E
- Country: Poland
- Voivodeship: Świętokrzyskie
- County: Włoszczowa
- Gmina: Włoszczowa

Rogienice [rɔɡʲɛˈnit͡sɛ] is a village in the administrative district of Gmina Włoszczowa, within Włoszczowa County, Świętokrzyskie Voivodeship, in south-central Poland. It lies approximately 11 km (7 mi) south-east of Włoszczowa and 43 km (27 mi) west of the regional capital Kielce.
