= Silpia Duża =

- Village
- Location within Poland
- Coordinates: 50°53′8″N 19°47′23″E
- Country: Poland
- Voivodeship: Świętokrzyskie
- County: Włoszczowa
- Gmina: Włoszczowa

Silpia Duża [ˈɕilpja ˈduʐa] is a village in the administrative district of Gmina Włoszczowa, within Włoszczowa County, Świętokrzyskie Voivodeship, in south-central Poland. It lies approximately 13 km (8 mi) west of Włoszczowa and 59 km (37 mi) west of the regional capital Kielce.
