= Papiernia, Włoszczowa County =

Papiernia
- Village
- Location within Poland
- Coordinates: 50°50′02″N 19°51′22″E
- Country: Poland
- Voivodeship: Świętokrzyskie
- County: Włoszczowa
- Gmina: Secemin

Papiernia [paˈpjɛrɲa] is a village in the administrative district of Gmina Secemin, within Włoszczowa County, Świętokrzyskie Voivodeship, in south-central Poland.
