= Jeżowice =

- Village
- Location within Poland
- Coordinates: 50°51′2″N 19°52′39″E
- Country: Poland
- Voivodeship: Świętokrzyskie
- County: Włoszczowa
- Gmina: Włoszczowa

Jeżowice [jɛʐɔˈvit͡sɛ] is a village in the administrative district of Gmina Włoszczowa, within Włoszczowa County, Świętokrzyskie Voivodeship, in south-central Poland. It lies approximately 7 km (4 mi) west of Włoszczowa and 53 km (33 mi) west of the regional capital Kielce.
