= Maleniec, Włoszczowa County =

Maleniec
- Village
- Location within Poland
- Coordinates: 50°45′36″N 19°47′38″E
- Country: Poland
- Voivodeship: Świętokrzyskie
- County: Włoszczowa
- Gmina: Secemin

Maleniec [maˈlɛɲɛt͡s] is a village in the administrative district of Gmina Secemin, within Włoszczowa County, Świętokrzyskie Voivodeship, in south-central Poland.
