= Isaac HaLevi Segal =

Isaac HaLevi Segal (c. 1580 – c. 1635) was a 17th-century Polish rabbi, scholar and an early Hebrew grammarian, chiefly known for his essay Siach Yitzchak published in 1627 and 1628. He is also the older brother of David HaLevi Segal and the great-grandfather of Asher Rabinowicz of Przedbórz.

== Biography ==
He was born in Ludmir, Volhynia. His father, Samuel HaLevi Segal was a leading rabbi and the maternal grandson of Eliezer Treves of Frankfurt. In his early years, he was sent to study in Lviv, where he soon garnered a reputation for Talmudic excellence. Around 1609, Joshua Falk publicly praised Isaac, going as far to include Isaac's liturgical poem “A Song of Redemption” in his work Sefer Meirat Einayim. Soon after this, Isaac became the Chief Rabbi of Chełm. In 1627, he was appointed Rosh Yeshiva of the Poznań Academy, and that same year he published his grammatical treatise Siach Yitzchak in Basel. He published the work again the following year in Prague, with a letter of approbation from Yom-Tov Lipmann Heller. His essay also provided an early exposition of Kabbalah. Besides Siach Yitzchak, he wrote many other works during his lifetime; however only two were published after his death, those being his responsa published in 1737 in Germany, and his commentaries of several Talmudic tractates also published in Germany. Isaac was also known for several of his halakhic rulings, recorded in the works of his brother David. Isaac was a proponent of the use of peshat, when analyzing rabbinic texts, and ruled leniently regarding agunot. Isaac also ruled extensively on issues regarding the loss of capital and emergency requirements that go beyond the letter of the law. He died in Poznan around 1635. His youngest daughter married Rabbi Yitzchak Rabinowicz, who was the grandfather of Asher Rabinowicz of Przedbórz and great-grandfather of Yaakov Yitzchak Rabinowicz, who founded Peshischa Hasidism.
