= Jamskie =

- Village
- Location within Poland
- Coordinates: 50°54′N 19°59′E
- Country: Poland
- Voivodeship: Świętokrzyskie
- County: Włoszczowa
- Gmina: Włoszczowa

Jamskie [ˈjamskʲɛ] is a village in the administrative district of Gmina Włoszczowa, within Włoszczowa County, Świętokrzyskie Voivodeship, in south-central Poland. It lies approximately 6 km (4 mi) north of Włoszczowa and 45 km (28 mi) west of the regional capital Kielce.
