= Psary-Kolonia =

- Village
- Location within Poland
- Coordinates: 50°43′16″N 19°49′16″E
- Country: Poland
- Voivodeship: Świętokrzyskie
- County: Włoszczowa
- Gmina: Secemin

Psary-Kolonia [ˈpsarɨ kɔˈlɔɲa] is a village in the administrative district of Gmina Secemin, within Włoszczowa County, Świętokrzyskie Voivodeship, in south-central Poland.
