= Dąbie, Gmina Secemin =

Dąbie
- Village
- Location within Poland
- Coordinates: 50°44′24″N 19°45′22″E
- Country: Poland
- Voivodeship: Świętokrzyskie
- County: Włoszczowa
- Gmina: Secemin
- Population: 150

Dąbie [ˈdɔmbjɛ] is a village in the administrative district of Gmina Secemin, within Włoszczowa County, Świętokrzyskie Voivodeship, in south-central Poland. It lies approximately 7 km (4 mi) south-west of Secemin, 20 km (12 mi) south-west of Włoszczowa, and 63 km (39 mi) west of the regional capital Kielce.
