= Krzepice, Świętokrzyskie Voivodeship =

Krzepice
- Village
- Location within Poland
- Coordinates: 50°43′58″N 19°50′29″E
- Country: Poland
- Voivodeship: Świętokrzyskie
- County: Włoszczowa
- Gmina: Secemin
- Population: 100

Krzepice [kʂɛˈpit͡sɛ] is a village in the administrative district of Gmina Secemin, within Włoszczowa County, Świętokrzyskie Voivodeship, in south-central Poland. It lies approximately 4 km (2 mi) south of Secemin, 17 km (11 mi) south-west of Włoszczowa, and 58 km (36 mi) west of the regional capital Kielce.
