= Wymysłów, Włoszczowa County =

Wymysłów
- Village
- Location within Poland
- Coordinates: 50°49′50″N 20°5′46″E
- Country: Poland
- Voivodeship: Świętokrzyskie
- County: Włoszczowa
- Gmina: Włoszczowa

Wymysłów [vɨˈmɨswuf] is a village in the administrative district of Gmina Włoszczowa, within Włoszczowa County, Świętokrzyskie Voivodeship, in south-central Poland. It lies approximately 10 km (6 mi) east of Włoszczowa and 38 km (24 mi) west of the regional capital Kielce.
