= Gmina Secemin =

Gmina Secemin Secemin Commune
- Gmina
- Flag Coat of arms
- Interactive map of Gmina Secemin
- Coordinates (Secemin): 50°46′4″N 19°50′18″E
- Country: Poland
- Voivodeship: Świętokrzyskie
- County: Włoszczowa
- Seat: Secemin

Area
  - Total: 164.13 km^{2} (63.37 sq mi)

Population (2016)
  - Total: 4,873
  - Density: 29.69/km^{2} (76.90/sq mi)
- Postal code: 29-145
- Area code: +48 34
- Car plates: TLW
- Website: http://www.ug-secemin.init.pl

Gmina Secemin is a rural gmina (administrative district) in Włoszczowa County, Świętokrzyskie Voivodeship, in south-central Poland. Its seat is the village of Secemin, which lies approximately 14 kilometres (9 mi) south-west of Włoszczowa and 57 km (35 mi) west of the regional capital Kielce.

The gmina covers an area of 164.13 square kilometres (63.4 sq mi), and as of 2006 its total population is 5,171.

== Villages ==
Gmina Secemin contains the villages and settlements of Bichniów, Brzozowa, Celiny, Czaryż, Dąbie, Daleszec, Gabrielów, Gródek, Kluczyce, Krzepice, Krzepin, Kuczków, Lipiny, Maleniec, Marchocice, Międzylesie, Miny, Nadolnik, Osiny, Papiernia, Pniaki, Psary, Psary-Kolonia, Ropocice, Secemin, Wałkonowy Dolne, Wałkonowy Górne, Wincentów, Wola Czaryska, Wola Kuczkowska, Wolica, Zakrzów, Żelisławice, Żelisławiczki and Zwlecza.

== Neighbouring gminas ==
Gmina Secemin is bordered by the gminas of Koniecpol, Radków, Szczekociny and Włoszczowa.
