= Motyczno =

- Village
- Location within Poland
- Coordinates: 50°53′27″N 19°58′24″E
- Country: Poland
- Voivodeship: Świętokrzyskie
- County: Włoszczowa
- Gmina: Włoszczowa

Motyczno [mɔˈtɨt͡ʂnɔ] is a village in the administrative district of Gmina Włoszczowa, within Włoszczowa County, Świętokrzyskie Voivodeship, in south-central Poland. It lies approximately 5 km (3 mi) north of Włoszczowa and 46 km (29 mi) west of the regional capital Kielce.
