= Danków Duży =

- Village
- Location within Poland
- Coordinates: 50°53′N 19°56′E
- Country: Poland
- Voivodeship: Świętokrzyskie
- County: Włoszczowa
- Gmina: Włoszczowa

Danków Duży [ˈdankuf ˈduʐɨ] is a village in the administrative district of Gmina Włoszczowa, within Włoszczowa County, Świętokrzyskie Voivodeship, in south-central Poland. It lies approximately 5 km (3 mi) north-west of Włoszczowa and 48 km (30 mi) west of the regional capital Kielce.
