= Nadolnik, Świętokrzyskie Voivodeship =

Nadolnik
- Village
- Location within Poland
- Coordinates: 50°51′0″N 19°50′8″E
- Country: Poland
- Voivodeship: Świętokrzyskie
- County: Włoszczowa
- Gmina: Secemin

Nadolnik [naˈdɔlnik] is a village in the administrative district of Gmina Secemin, within Włoszczowa County, Świętokrzyskie Voivodeship, in south-central Poland. It lies approximately 10 km (6 mi) north of Secemin, 10 km (6 mi) west of Włoszczowa, and 56 km (35 mi) west of the regional capital Kielce.
