= Ludwinów, Włoszczowa County =

Ludwinów
- Village
- Location within Poland
- Coordinates: 50°47′12″N 19°59′12″E
- Country: Poland
- Voivodeship: Świętokrzyskie
- County: Włoszczowa
- Gmina: Włoszczowa

Ludwinów [ludˈvinuf] is a village in the administrative district of Gmina Włoszczowa, within Włoszczowa County, Świętokrzyskie Voivodeship, in south-central Poland. It lies approximately 8 km (5 mi) south of Włoszczowa and 46 km (29 mi) west of the regional capital Kielce.
