= Dąbie, Gmina Włoszczowa =

Dąbie
- Village
- Location within Poland
- Coordinates: 50°44′14″N 20°3′5″E
- Country: Poland
- Voivodeship: Świętokrzyskie
- County: Włoszczowa
- Gmina: Włoszczowa

Dąbie [ˈdɔmbjɛ] is a village in the administrative district of Gmina Włoszczowa, within Włoszczowa County, Świętokrzyskie Voivodeship, in south-central Poland. It lies approximately 15 km (9 mi) south-east of Włoszczowa and 43 km (27 mi) west of the regional capital Kielce.
