= Boczkowice, Świętokrzyskie Voivodeship =

Boczkowice
- Village
- Location within Poland
- Coordinates: 50°45′36″N 20°2′34″E
- Country: Poland
- Voivodeship: Świętokrzyskie
- County: Włoszczowa
- Gmina: Włoszczowa

Boczkowice [bɔt͡ʂkɔˈvit͡sɛ] is a village in the administrative district of Gmina Włoszczowa, within Włoszczowa County, Świętokrzyskie Voivodeship, in south-central Poland. It lies approximately 12 km (7 mi) south-east of Włoszczowa and 43 km (27 mi) west of the regional capital Kielce.
