= Gródek, Świętokrzyskie Voivodeship =

Gródek
- Village
- Location within Poland
- Coordinates: 50°55′51″N 21°15′55″E
- Country: Poland
- Voivodeship: Świętokrzyskie
- County: Włoszczowa
- Gmina: Secemin

Gródek [ˈɡrudɛk] is a village in the administrative district of Gmina Secemin, within Włoszczowa County, Świętokrzyskie Voivodeship, in south-central Poland.
