= Łachów, Świętokrzyskie Voivodeship =

Łachów
- Village
- Location within Poland
- Coordinates: 50°50′29″N 19°55′43″E
- Country: Poland
- Voivodeship: Świętokrzyskie
- County: Włoszczowa
- Gmina: Włoszczowa

Łachów [ˈwaxuf] is a village in the administrative district of Gmina Włoszczowa, within Włoszczowa County, Świętokrzyskie Voivodeship, in south-central Poland. It lies approximately 4 km (2 mi) south-west of Włoszczowa and 49 km (30 mi) west of the regional capital Kielce.
