= Lelów =

- Village
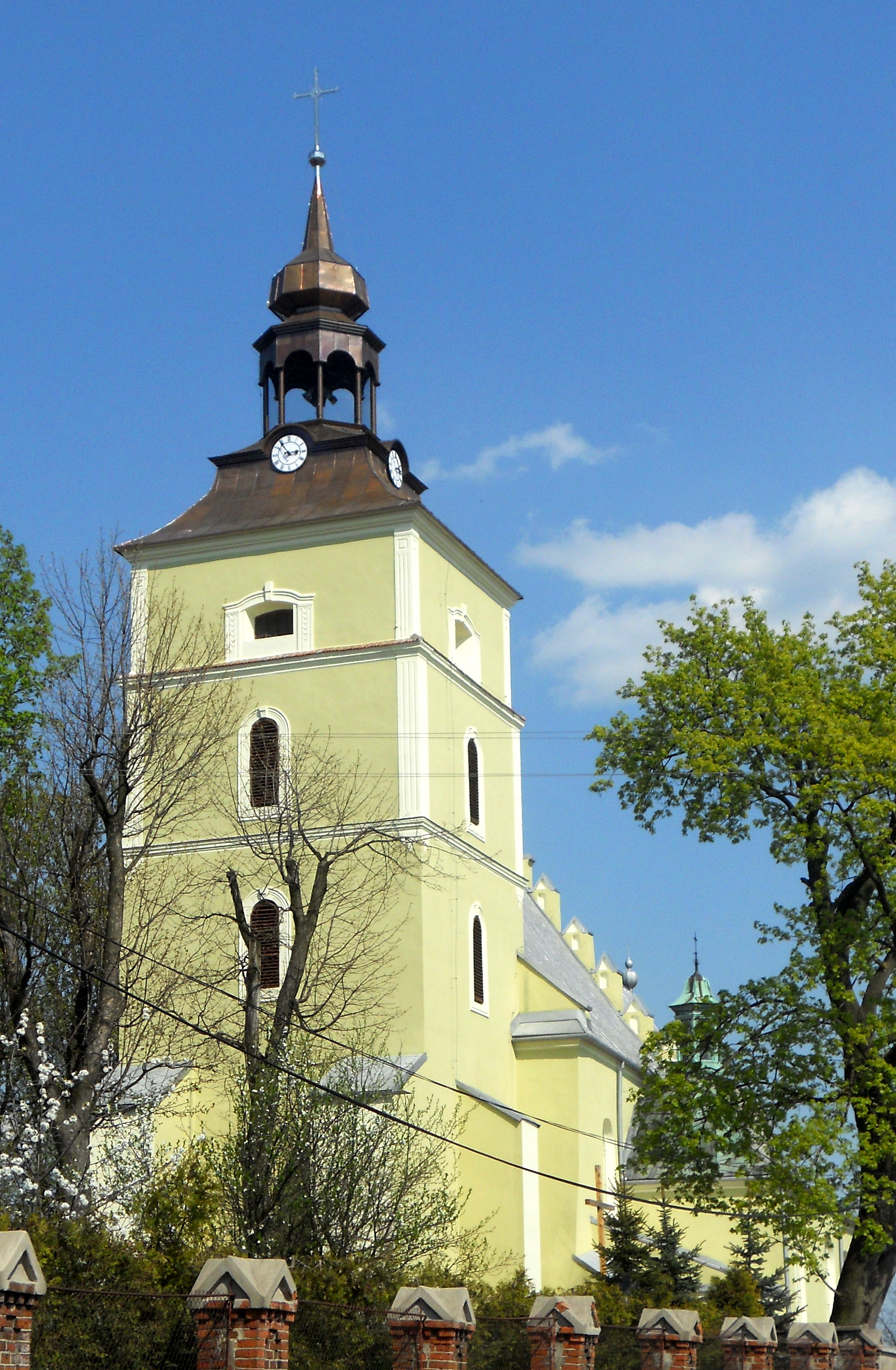
- Saint Martin Church

- Location within Poland
- Coordinates: 50°40′57″N 19°37′31″E
- Country: Poland
- Voivodeship: Silesian
- County: Częstochowa
- Gmina: Lelów
- Population: 2,127

Lelów [ˈlɛluf] (Yiddish: לעלוב - Lelov) is a village in Częstochowa County, Silesian Voivodeship, in southern Poland. It is the seat of the gmina (administrative district) called Gmina Lelów. In the Kingdom of Poland, Lelów was an important urban center of Lesser Poland, as a capital of a county which belonged to Kraków Voivodeship.

== History ==
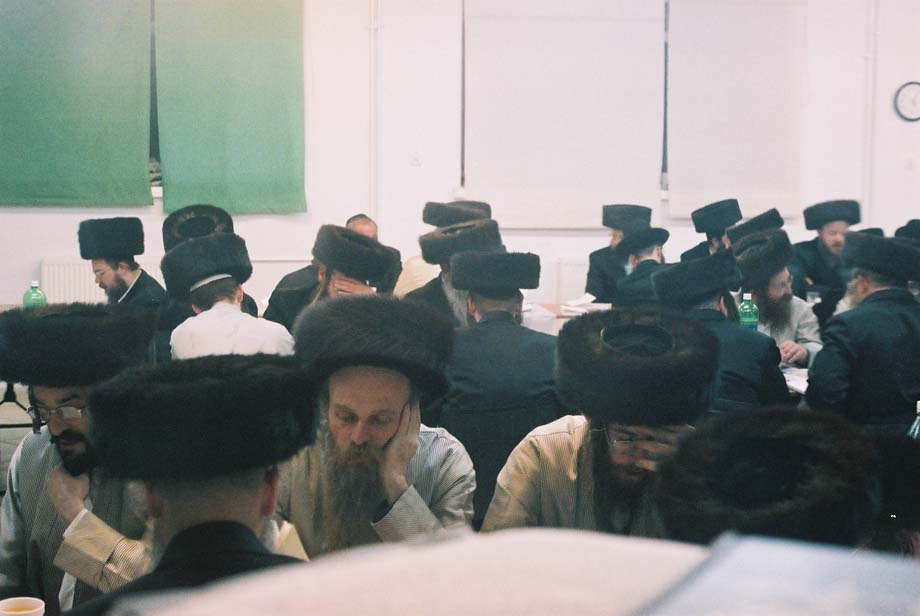
Hasidic Jews praying in the synagogue

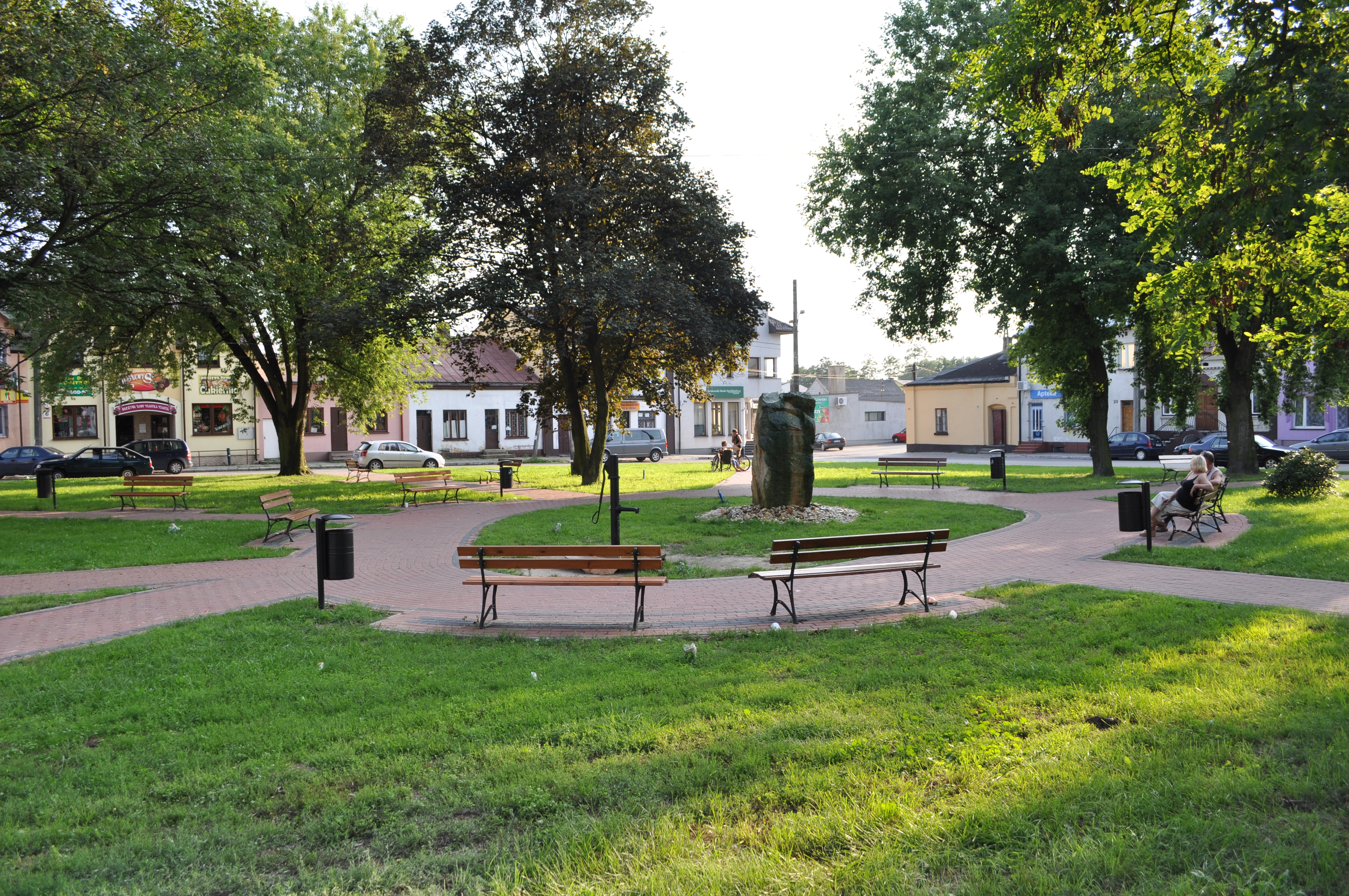
Market Square

In the early days of the Kingdom of Poland, a gord was established on the Białka river bank, in a swampy area, which gave protection from invaders. First documented mention about Lelów appeared in the year 1193, in a document issued by Pope Celestine III. In 1246, during the period known as Fragmentation of Poland (see Feudal fragmentation), Prince Konrad I of Masovia initiated construction of the town, in the location of the ancient gord. In the early 14th century Lelów, which by then was property of Bishops of Kraków, was captured by knights of Władysław I the Elbow-high. The town was occupied by German and Czech troops, loyal to Bishop Jan Muskata (see also Rebellion of wójt Albert).

In the 14th century Lelów prospered, due to royal protection and privileges. Its population reached 1,200, and King Casimir III the Great built here a castle, and surrounded the town with a defensive wall. Lelów was located near the border with Czech-ruled Silesia, and as such, played an important role in the system of defence of Poland. In 1341 Lelów received Magdeburg rights from King Casimir, and became a county town in Kraków Voivodeship. In July 1345, during the Polish-Bohemian War, Czech units were defeated by the Poles and their Hungarian allies near Lelów. In the 15th and 16th centuries, Lelów remained one of the most important towns of Lesser Poland. It frequently burned, but managed to recover, and local cloth makers were famous across the country. In 1638 Lelów almost completely burned in a great fire, and further destruction was brought by the Swedish-Polish war, after which the town never recovered. Lelów was once again destroyed in the Great Northern War, after which its defensive wall was pulled down.

After the Partitions of Poland, Lelów briefly belonged to Kingdom of Prussia’s province of New Silesia (1793-1806). Since 1815, it was part of Russian-controlled Congress Poland, and its decline continued. Lelów County ceased to exist in 1837, and the area of the town was one of centers of January Uprising. In 1827, Lelów had a population of 785, and in 1825, the ancient Saint Francis Monastery was destroyed. In 1869 Russian government reduced Lelów to the status of a village. World War I did not cause any significant damage, and in the Second Polish Republic, Lelów belonged to Kielce Voivodeship. On September 4, 1939, during the Invasion of Poland, the Wehrmacht invaded and burned the 14th-century St. Martin's church, together with most of the village. Further destruction took place in January 1945, when retreating German soldiers fought the advancing Red Army. The church was rebuilt after the war, but without several valuable items and ornaments.

== Attractions ==
The village's main attractions include:

- Catholic St. Martin's church from the 14th century, remodelled in 1638, with a sculpture of crucified Jesus saved from fire in 1939 and a Chapel of Mother of God
- Grave of Hasidic Tzadik Dovid Biderman, visited each January by Hasidic pilgrims from all over the world,
- A market square unique in Europe, with two streets joining the square in each corner
- A culinary attraction known as ciulim (a non-translatable Polish word). Ciulim is cooked for special family occasions (birthdays, anniversaries, etc.) and major holidays (Christmas, Easter, etc.). It is related to the traditional Jewish dish, is a phonetically distorted form of cholent. Since 2003, every August there is Ciulim and Cholent festival taking place in Lelów.
- A Gothic castle, founded by King Casimir III the Great. The castle fell into a ruin in the 17th century, and was demolished in 1804–1805.
- A 1,000 meter long defensive wall made of stone, built in the 14th century, with several gates. The wall was gradually pulled down in 1848–1870.
- The Franciscan Monastery, built in 1357, was demolished in 1825.

== Roads ==
The main roads passing Lelów are:

- National 46 (Kudowa–Jędrzejów)
- Road No. 794 (Koniecpol–Kraków)
- Road No. 789 (Lelów-Żarki)

== Sister city ==
- Allentown, United States
