= Natan David Rabinowitz =

Rabbi Natan David Rabinowitz (1814-Szydłowiec, 1865), the son of Rabbi Yerachmiel of Przysucha, was a Polish rabbi who established a local Hasidic court with a large following. He was the patriarch of the Biala Hasidic Dynasty.

He is to be distinguished from the talmudic scholar Nosson Dovid Rabinowich (Rabinovits, Natan David ben Yehudah Leyb) author of Binu Shenot Dor va-Dor. Jerusalem: Feldheim, 1984
