= Secemin =

- Village
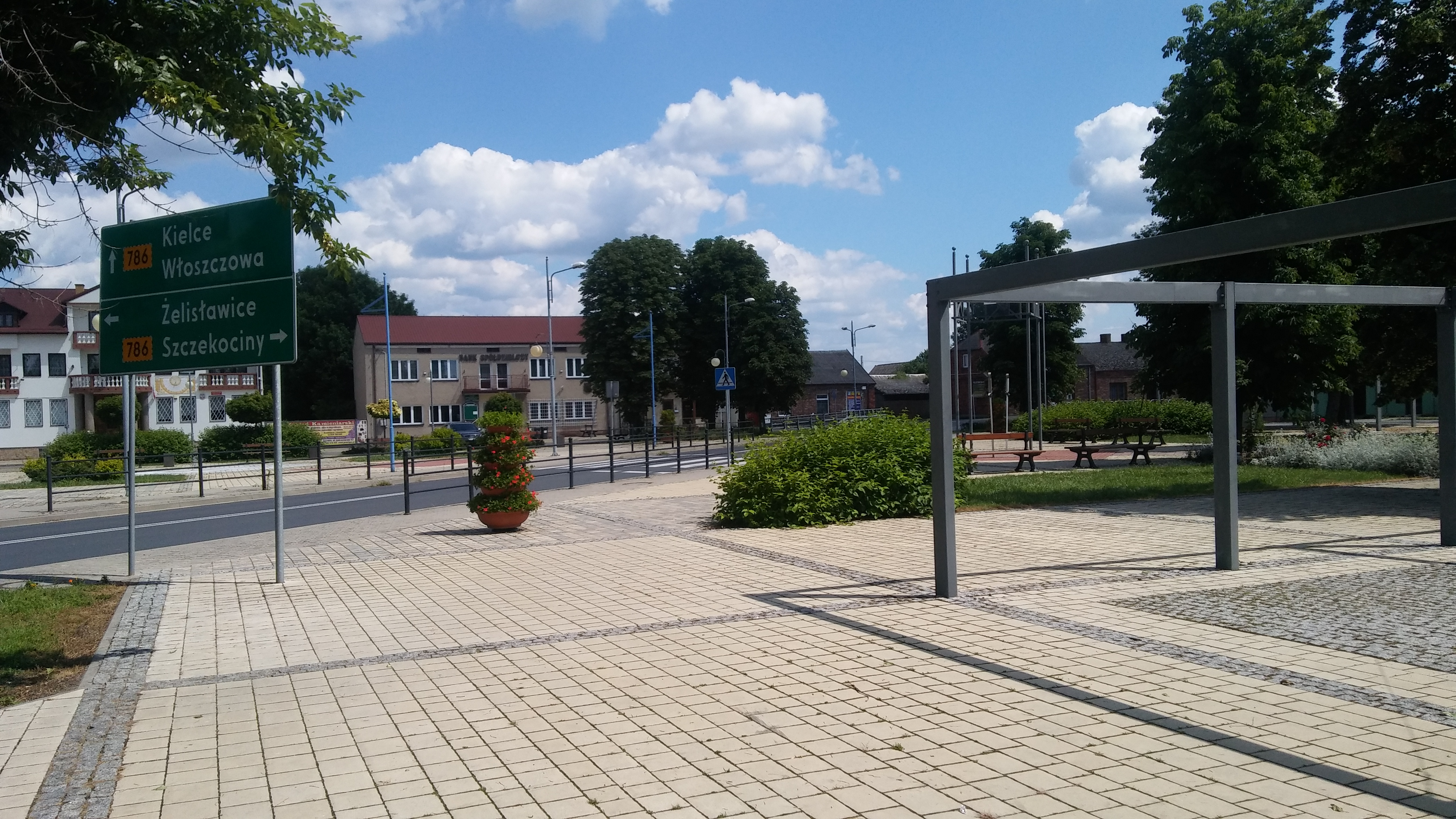
- Market Square in Secemin

- Coat of arms

- Location within Poland
- Coordinates: 50°46′4″N 19°50′18″E
- Country: Poland
- Voivodeship: Świętokrzyskie
- County: Włoszczowa
- Gmina: Secemin

Population
  - Total: 1,600

Secemin [sɛˈt͡sɛmin] is a village in Włoszczowa County, Świętokrzyskie Voivodeship, in south-central Poland. It is the seat of the gmina (administrative district) called Gmina Secemin. It lies historic Lesser Poland, approximately 14 km (9 mi) south-west of Włoszczowa and 57 km (35 mi) west of the regional capital Kielce. The village used to be a town from 1401 to 1869. Its name comes from the local swamps, called sece.

== History ==
Secemin has a long and rich history, which dates back to a defensive gord, established in the 13th century among swamps and forests, in the proximity to the medieval merchant routes. Earliest documented mention of Secemin comes from the year 1291, when Duke of Kraków and Sandomierz, Bolesław V the Chaste met here with monks from Henrykow. In the 14th century, Secemin was a settlement, with a watermill and a forge, as well as a Roman Catholic parish church.

In 1401, Secemin received Magdeburg rights town charter from King Wladyslaw Jagiello (according to some other sources, Secemin received the charter in the mid-14th century, from King Kazimierz Wielki). The town was allowed to organize two fairs a year, as well as weekly markets. Following the order of King Jagiello, Secemin became property of knight Piotr Szafraniec (Starykon coat of arms), who had distinguished himself in the Battle of Grunwald. Szafraniec funded a stone church, and in the late Middle Ages, Secemin emerged as a local center of artisans, with butchers, shoemakers, potters, clothmakers, two watermills and a bath. The town was located on a very busy merchant route from Gdańsk to Kraków.

Secemin remained in the hands of the Szafraniec family, which resided in a fortified manor house. Krzysztof Szafraniec, the son of Piotr Szafraniec, was a highwayman and a kidnapper. Captured by the starosta of Kraków, he was executed in 1484. In 1519, King Zygmunt Stary confirmed Secemin's Magdeburg rights, and gave permission for three more fairs annually. In 1540, the population of the town was 600, and during the Protestant Reformation, it became one of centers of Calvinism in Lesser Poland. In 1553, Stanislaw Szafraniec opened here a Calvinist prayer house, and from 1556 to 1617, as many as 23 Calvinist synods took place here. In the mid-16th century, Secemin was the residence of Felix Cruciger, the superintendent of the Reformed churches of Lesser Poland. Cruciger died here on April 12, 1563. Apart from the prayer house, local Calvinists opened here a renowned school, which was supported, among others, by Mikołaj Rej, who lived in the nearby Nagłowice. The school was famous for its rich library, its last chairman was a Frenchman named Jan Poetevinus.

Secemin prospered in the period known as the Polish Golden Age. The decline of the town began during the catastrophic Swedish invasion of Poland (1650s), when it lost most of the population, which was replaced by Jewish settlers. Secemin remained in the hands of the Szafraniec family until the mid-17th century, when, as a dowry, it was transferred to Jan Samuel Czarnocki (Lis coat of arms), the husband of Zofia Szafraniec. The Czarnockis owned the town until 1788, building here a manor house, which was demolished in the 1970s.

Until the Partitions of Poland, Secemin belonged to Sandomierz Voivodeship. From 1815 to 1915, it was part of Russian-controlled Congress Poland, and in 1821, its population was 833, with 110 houses, most of which were made of timber. In 1862, the town almost completely burned in a great fire, and after the January Uprising, Russian government reduced Secemin to the status of a village. In the Second Polish Republic, Secemin belonged to Kielce Voivodeship. On September 3, 1939, the village was captured by the Wehrmacht. Secemin was an important center of anti-German resistance. In November 1943, a skirmish between the Germans and a Home Army unit took place here. As a reprisal, the Germans shot 44 residents of the village. On October 27, 1944, a large battle took place near Secemin, in which units of the Home Army and the Bataliony Chlopskie fought the Wehrmacht.

Among points of interest there is a Gothic church (1402), which from 1554 to 1617 was a Calvinist prayer house. There also are remains of a 16th-century moat, which protected the Szafraniec family manor house.
