= Występy =

- Village
- Location within Poland
- Coordinates: 50°51′51″N 20°11′29″E
- Country: Poland
- Voivodeship: Świętokrzyskie
- County: Włoszczowa
- Gmina: Krasocin
- Population: 510

Występy [vɨsˈtɛmpɨ] is a village in the administrative district of Gmina Krasocin, within Włoszczowa County, Świętokrzyskie Voivodeship, in south-central Poland. It lies approximately 6 km (4 mi) south-east of Krasocin, 16 km (10 mi) east of Włoszczowa, and 30 km (19 mi) west of the regional capital Kielce.
