= Świerków =

- Village
- Location within Poland
- Coordinates: 50°40′2″N 20°1′20″E
- Country: Poland
- Voivodeship: Świętokrzyskie
- County: Włoszczowa
- Gmina: Radków

Świerków (Polish pronunciation: [ˈɕfjɛrkuf]) is a village in the administrative district of Gmina Radków, within Włoszczowa County, Świętokrzyskie Voivodeship, in south-central Poland. It lies approximately 6 km (4 mi) south-east of Radków, 22 km (14 mi) south of Włoszczowa, and 49 km (30 mi) south-west of the regional capital Kielce.
