= Huta Stara =

- Village
- Location within Poland
- Coordinates: 50°54′20″N 20°12′0″E
- Country: Poland
- Voivodeship: Świętokrzyskie
- County: Włoszczowa
- Gmina: Krasocin
- Population: 39

Huta Stara [ˈxuta ˈstara] is a small village in the administrative district of Gmina Krasocin, within Włoszczowa County, Świętokrzyskie Voivodeship, in south-central Poland. It lies approximately 7 km (4 mi) east of Krasocin, 18 km (11 mi) east of Włoszczowa, and 30 km (19 mi) west of the regional capital Kielce.
