= Skociszewy =

- Village
- Location within Poland
- Coordinates: 50°44′26″N 20°1′43″E
- Country: Poland
- Voivodeship: Świętokrzyskie
- County: Włoszczowa
- Gmina: Radków

Skociszewy [skɔt͡ɕiˈʂɛvɨ] is a village in the administrative district of Gmina Radków, within Włoszczowa County, Świętokrzyskie Voivodeship, in south-central Poland. It lies approximately 5 km (3 mi) north-east of Radków, 14 km (9 mi) south of Włoszczowa, and 45 km (28 mi) west of the regional capital Kielce.
