= Belina, Świętokrzyskie Voivodeship =

Belina
- Village
- Location within Poland
- Coordinates: 50°51′27″N 20°5′33″E
- Country: Poland
- Voivodeship: Świętokrzyskie
- County: Włoszczowa
- Gmina: Krasocin
- Population: 17

Belina [bɛˈlina] is a village in the administrative district of Gmina Krasocin, within Włoszczowa County, Świętokrzyskie Voivodeship, in south-central Poland. It lies approximately 4 km (2 mi) south-west of Krasocin, 9 km (6 mi) east of Włoszczowa, and 37 km (23 mi) west of the regional capital Kielce.
