= Ludynia =

- Village
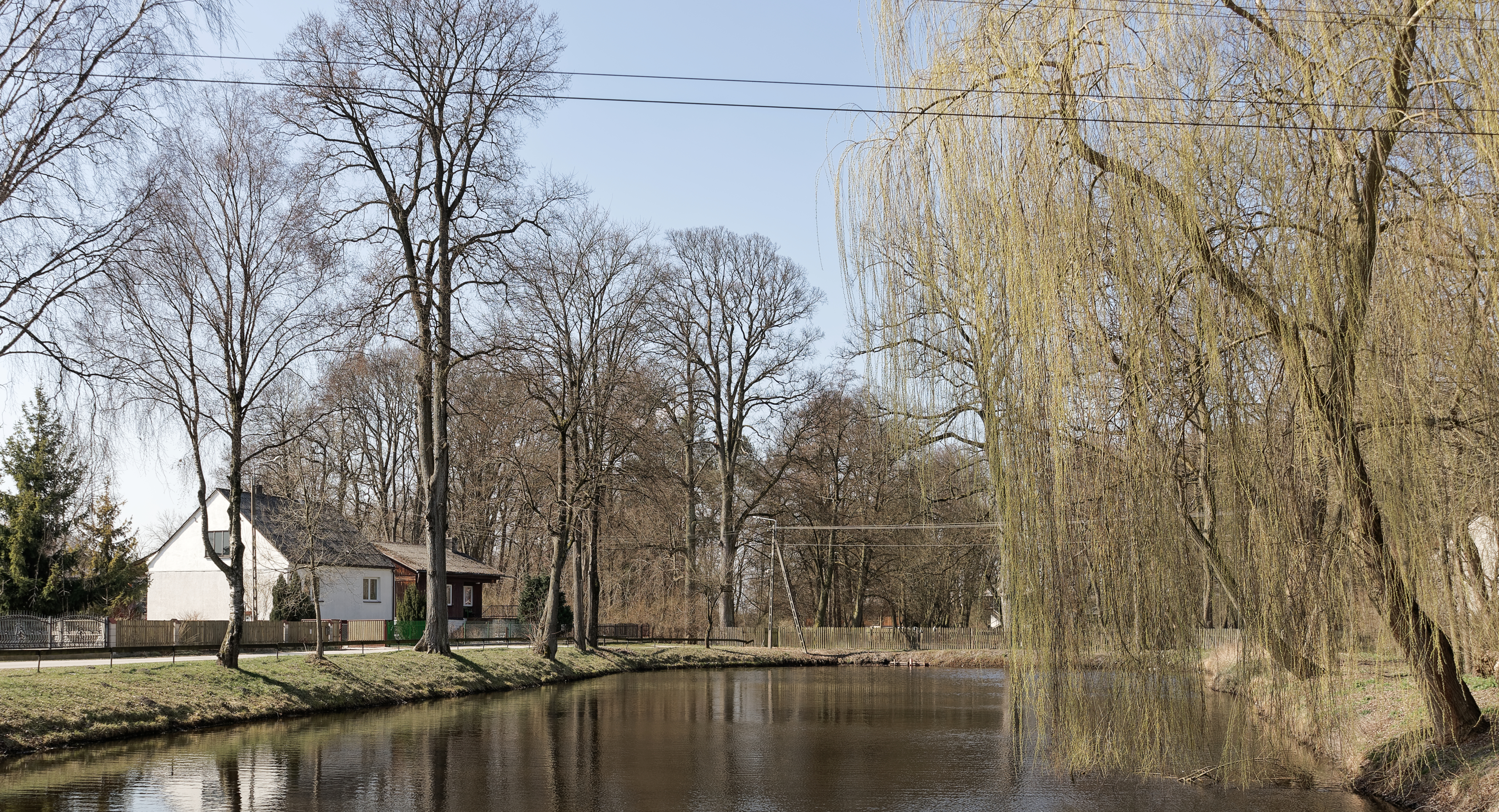

- Location within Poland
- Coordinates: 50°50′38″N 20°7′5″E
- Country: Poland
- Voivodeship: Świętokrzyskie
- County: Włoszczowa
- Gmina: Krasocin
- Population: 401

Ludynia [luˈdɨɲa] is a village in the administrative district of Gmina Krasocin, within Włoszczowa County, Świętokrzyskie Voivodeship, in south-central Poland. It lies approximately 6 km (4 mi) south of Krasocin, 11 km (7 mi) east of Włoszczowa, and 36 km (22 mi) west of the regional capital Kielce.
