= Chycza =

- Village
- Location within Poland
- Coordinates: 50°41′56″N 20°3′24″E
- Country: Poland
- Voivodeship: Świętokrzyskie
- County: Włoszczowa
- Gmina: Radków

Chycza [ˈxɨt͡ʂa] is a village in the administrative district of Gmina Radków, within Włoszczowa County, Świętokrzyskie Voivodeship, in south-central Poland. It lies approximately 6 km (4 mi) east of Radków, 19 km (12 mi) south of Włoszczowa, and 45 km (28 mi) south-west of the regional capital Kielce.
