= Chotów, Świętokrzyskie Voivodeship =

Chotów
- Village
- Location within Poland
- Coordinates: 50°54′29″N 20°2′18″E
- Country: Poland
- Voivodeship: Świętokrzyskie
- County: Włoszczowa
- Gmina: Krasocin
- Population: 184

Chotów [ˈxɔtuf] is a village in the administrative district of Gmina Krasocin, within Włoszczowa County, Świętokrzyskie Voivodeship, in south-central Poland. It lies approximately 6 km (4 mi) west of Krasocin, 8 km (5 mi) north-east of Włoszczowa, and 41 km (25 mi) west of the regional capital Kielce.
