= Czostków, Świętokrzyskie Voivodeship =

Czostków
- Village
- Location within Poland
- Coordinates: 50°51′12″N 20°9′36″E
- Country: Poland
- Voivodeship: Świętokrzyskie
- County: Włoszczowa
- Gmina: Krasocin
- Population: 698

Czostków [ˈt͡ʂɔstkuf] is a village in the administrative district of Gmina Krasocin, within Włoszczowa County, Świętokrzyskie Voivodeship, in south-central Poland. It lies approximately 5 km (3 mi) south-east of Krasocin, 14 km (9 mi) east of Włoszczowa, and 33 km (21 mi) west of the regional capital Kielce.
