= Jakubów, Włoszczowa County =

Jakubów
- Village
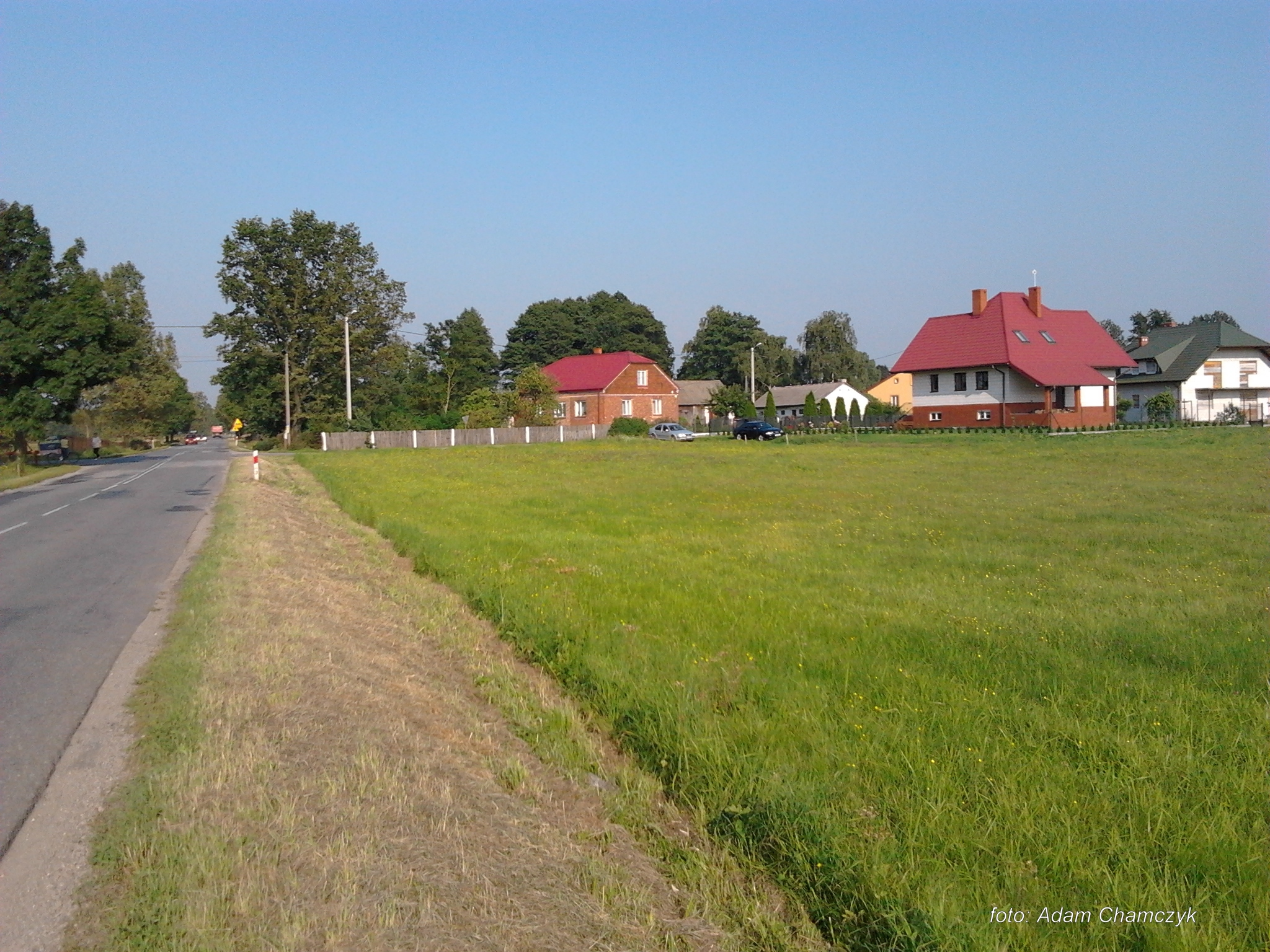

- Location within Poland
- Coordinates: 50°54′31″N 20°10′2″E
- Country: Poland
- Voivodeship: Świętokrzyskie
- County: Włoszczowa
- Gmina: Krasocin
- Population: 136

Jakubów [jaˈkubuf] is a village in the administrative district of Gmina Krasocin, within Włoszczowa County, Świętokrzyskie Voivodeship, in south-central Poland. It lies approximately 5 km (3 mi) north-east of Krasocin, 16 km (10 mi) north-east of Włoszczowa, and 32 km (20 mi) west of the regional capital Kielce.
