= Ostrów, Włoszczowa County =

Ostrów
- Village
- Location within Poland
- Coordinates: 50°51′24″N 20°5′33″E
- Country: Poland
- Voivodeship: Świętokrzyskie
- County: Włoszczowa
- Gmina: Krasocin
- Population: 415

Ostrów [ˈɔstruf] is a village in the administrative district of Gmina Krasocin, within Włoszczowa County, Świętokrzyskie Voivodeship, in south-central Poland. It lies approximately 5 km (3 mi) south-west of Krasocin, 9 km (6 mi) east of Włoszczowa, and 37 km (23 mi) west of the regional capital Kielce.
