= Kossów =

- Village
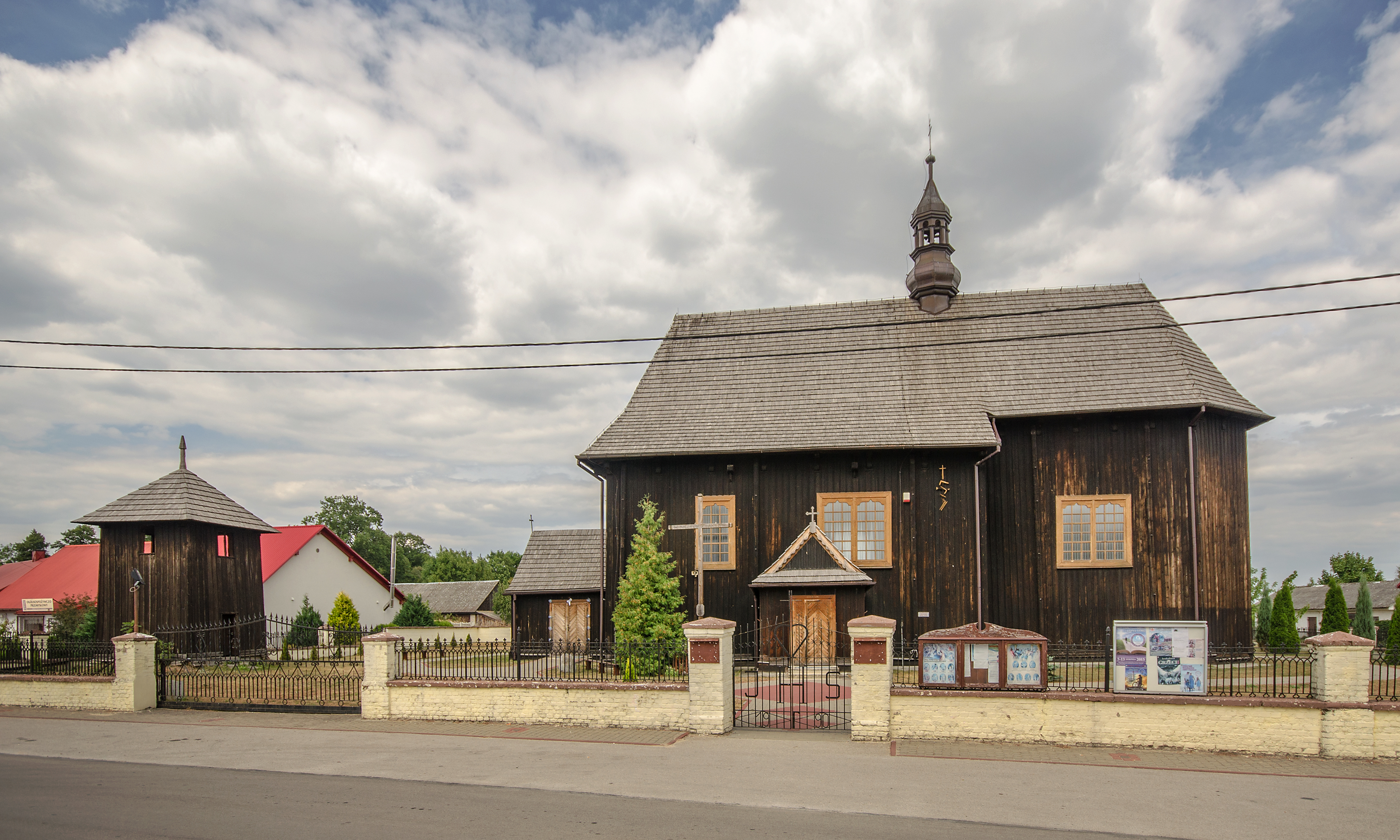
- Catholic church

- Location within Poland
- Coordinates: 50°41′48″N 20°1′40″E
- Country: Poland
- Voivodeship: Świętokrzyskie
- County: Włoszczowa
- Gmina: Radków
- Population: 360
- Website: http://www.kossow.republika.pl/

Kossów [ˈkɔssuf] is a village in the administrative district of Gmina Radków, within Włoszczowa County, Świętokrzyskie Voivodeship, in south-central Poland. It lies approximately 4 km (2 mi) south-east of Radków, 18 km (11 mi) south of Włoszczowa, and 47 km (29 mi) south-west of the regional capital Kielce.

For centuries Kossow belonged to Lelów County, Kraków Voivodeship, historic province of Lesser Poland. It is not known when it received Magdeburg rights: probably this happened some time in the 14th century. Jan Długosz wrote that in the 15th century it already was a private town. Kossow remained a small town, losing its charter in 1869, as a punishment for January Uprising.

The village has wooden church of Our Lady of Częstochowa (17th century, rebuilt in 1937 and 1958), wooden bell tower (17th century), and a 19th-century water mill.
