= Skorków =

- Village
- Location within Poland
- Coordinates: 50°51′5″N 20°13′32″E
- Country: Poland
- Voivodeship: Świętokrzyskie
- County: Włoszczowa
- Gmina: Krasocin
- Population: 641

Skorków [ˈskɔrkuf] is a village in the administrative district of Gmina Krasocin, within Włoszczowa County, Świętokrzyskie Voivodeship, in south-central Poland. It lies approximately 9 km (6 mi) south-east of Krasocin, 19 km (12 mi) east of Włoszczowa, and 28 km (17 mi) west of the regional capital Kielce.
