= Ojsławice =

- Village
- Location within Poland
- Coordinates: 50°42′8″N 19°52′1″E
- Country: Poland
- Voivodeship: Świętokrzyskie
- County: Włoszczowa
- Gmina: Radków
- Population: 110

Ojsławice [ɔi̯swaˈvit͡sɛ] is a village in the administrative district of Gmina Radków, within Włoszczowa County, Świętokrzyskie Voivodeship, in south-central Poland. It lies approximately 9 km (6 mi) west of Radków, 19 km (12 mi) south-west of Włoszczowa, and 57 km (35 mi) west of the regional capital Kielce.
