= Stojewsko =

- Village
- Location within Poland
- Coordinates: 50°54′41″N 20°8′54″E
- Country: Poland
- Voivodeship: Świętokrzyskie
- County: Włoszczowa
- Gmina: Krasocin
- Population: 137

Stojewsko [stɔˈjɛfskɔ] is a village in the administrative district of Gmina Krasocin, within Włoszczowa County, Świętokrzyskie Voivodeship, in south-central Poland. It lies approximately 4 km (2 mi) north-east of Krasocin, 15 km (9 mi) north-east of Włoszczowa, and 34 km (21 mi) west of the regional capital Kielce.
