= Kozia Wieś =

- Village
- Location within Poland
- Coordinates: 50°56′24″N 20°1′45″E
- Country: Poland
- Voivodeship: Świętokrzyskie
- County: Włoszczowa
- Gmina: Krasocin
- Population: 250

Kozia Wieś [ˈkɔʑa ˈvjɛɕ] is a village in the administrative district of Gmina Krasocin, within Włoszczowa County, Świętokrzyskie Voivodeship, in south-central Poland. It lies approximately 9 km (6 mi) north-west of Krasocin, 11 km (7 mi) north-east of Włoszczowa, and 42 km (26 mi) west of the regional capital Kielce.
