= Brygidów =

- Village
- Location within Poland
- Coordinates: 50°56′N 20°7′E
- Country: Poland
- Voivodeship: Świętokrzyskie
- County: Włoszczowa
- Gmina: Krasocin
- Population: 221

Brygidów [brɨˈɡiduf] is a village in the administrative district of Gmina Krasocin, within Włoszczowa County, Świętokrzyskie Voivodeship, in south-central Poland. It lies approximately 5 km (3 mi) north of Krasocin, 14 km (9 mi) north-east of Włoszczowa, and 36 km (22 mi) west of the regional capital Kielce.
