= Lipie, Włoszczowa County =

Lipie
- Village
- Location within Poland
- Coordinates: 50°53′27″N 20°8′19″E
- Country: Poland
- Voivodeship: Świętokrzyskie
- County: Włoszczowa
- Gmina: Krasocin
- Population: 220

Lipie [ˈlipjɛ] is a village in the administrative district of Gmina Krasocin, within Włoszczowa County, Świętokrzyskie Voivodeship, in south-central Poland. It lies approximately 2 km (1 mi) east of Krasocin, 13 km (8 mi) east of Włoszczowa, and 34 km (21 mi) west of the regional capital Kielce.
