= Dzierzgów, Świętokrzyskie Voivodeship =

Dzierzgów
- Village
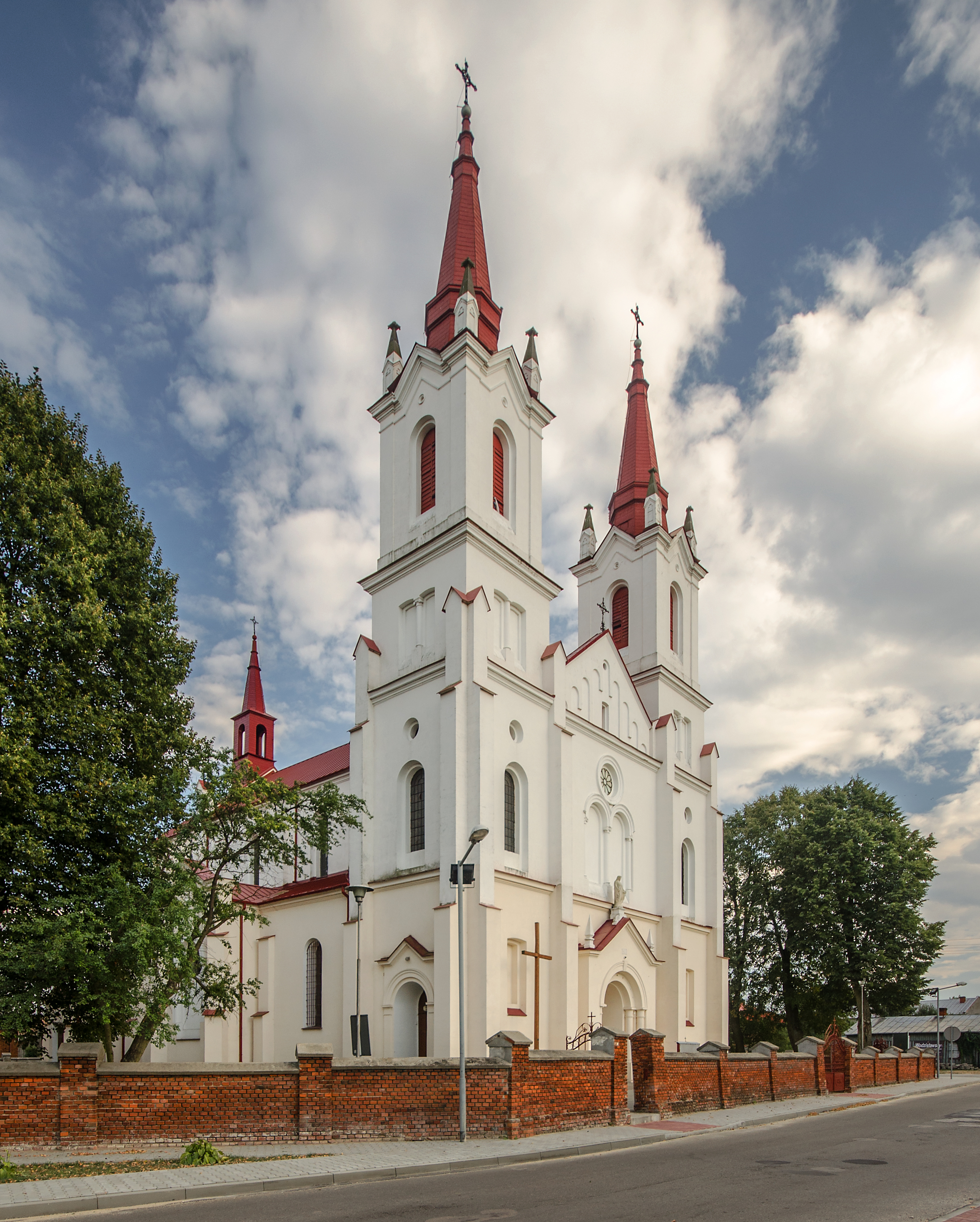
- Catholic church

- Location within Poland
- Coordinates: 50°42′13″N 19°57′4″E
- Country: Poland
- Voivodeship: Świętokrzyskie
- County: Włoszczowa
- Gmina: Radków
- Population: 290

Dzierzgów [ˈd͡ʑɛʐɡuf] is a village in the administrative district of Gmina Radków, within Włoszczowa County, Świętokrzyskie Voivodeship, in south-central Poland. It lies approximately 3 km (2 mi) south-west of Radków, 17 km (11 mi) south of Włoszczowa, and 51 km (32 mi) south-west of the regional capital Kielce.
