= Brzeście, Gmina Radków =

Brzeście
- Village
- Location within Poland
- Coordinates: 50°41′31″N 19°53′57″E
- Country: Poland
- Voivodeship: Świętokrzyskie
- County: Włoszczowa
- Gmina: Radków
- Population: 119

Brzeście [ˈbʐɛɕt͡ɕɛ] is a village in the administrative district of Gmina Radków, within Włoszczowa County, Świętokrzyskie Voivodeship, in south-central Poland. It lies approximately 7 km (4 mi) west of Radków, 19 km (12 mi) south of Włoszczowa, and 55 km (34 mi) south-west of the regional capital Kielce.
