= Bukowa, Włoszczowa County =

Bukowa
- Village
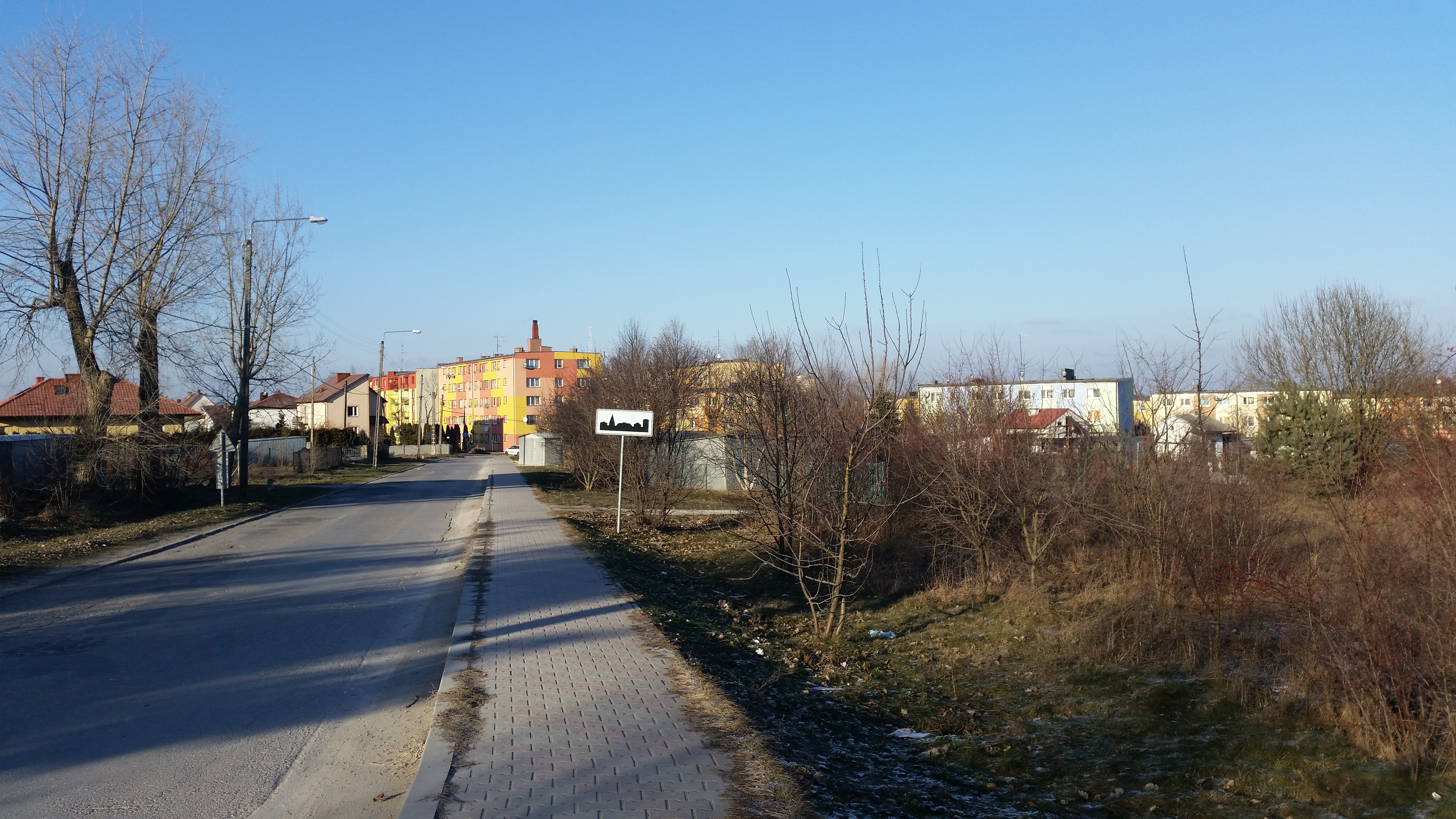

- Location within Poland
- Coordinates: 50°51′41″N 20°12′31″E
- Country: Poland
- Voivodeship: Świętokrzyskie
- County: Włoszczowa
- Gmina: Krasocin
- Population: 1,186

Bukowa [buˈkɔva] is a village in the administrative district of Gmina Krasocin, within Włoszczowa County, Świętokrzyskie Voivodeship, in south-central Poland. It lies approximately 8 km (5 mi) south-east of Krasocin, 18 km (11 mi) east of Włoszczowa, and 29 km (18 mi) west of the regional capital Kielce.
