= Mieczyn =

- Village
- Location within Poland
- Coordinates: 50°54′35″N 20°11′23″E
- Country: Poland
- Voivodeship: Świętokrzyskie
- County: Włoszczowa
- Gmina: Krasocin
- Population: 393

Mieczyn [ˈmjɛt͡ʂɨn] is a village in the administrative district of Gmina Krasocin, within Włoszczowa County, Świętokrzyskie Voivodeship, in south-central Poland. It lies approximately 6 km (4 mi) north-east of Krasocin, 17 km (11 mi) east of Włoszczowa, and 31 km (19 mi) west of the regional capital Kielce.
