= Nowy Dwór, Świętokrzyskie Voivodeship =

Nowy Dwór
- Village
- Location within Poland
- Coordinates: 50°53′1″N 20°6′45″E
- Country: Poland
- Voivodeship: Świętokrzyskie
- County: Włoszczowa
- Gmina: Krasocin
- Population: 114

Nowy Dwór [ˈnɔvɨ ˈdvur] is a village in the administrative district of Gmina Krasocin, within Włoszczowa County, Świętokrzyskie Voivodeship, in south-central Poland. It lies approximately 1 km (1 mi) south-west of Krasocin, 11 km (7 mi) east of Włoszczowa, and 36 km (22 mi) west of the regional capital Kielce.
