= Borowiec, Włoszczowa County =

Borowiec
- Village
- Location within Poland
- Coordinates: 50°54′26″N 20°6′20″E
- Country: Poland
- Voivodeship: Świętokrzyskie
- County: Włoszczowa
- Gmina: Krasocin
- Population: 104

Borowiec [bɔˈrɔvjɛt͡s] is a village in the administrative district of Gmina Krasocin, within Włoszczowa County, Świętokrzyskie Voivodeship, in south-central Poland. It lies approximately 3 km (2 mi) north-west of Krasocin, 12 km (7 mi) north-east of Włoszczowa, and 36 km (22 mi) west of the regional capital Kielce.
