= Sułków, Włoszczowa County =

Sułków
- Village
- Location within Poland
- Coordinates: 50°52′57″N 20°5′1″E
- Country: Poland
- Voivodeship: Świętokrzyskie
- County: Włoszczowa
- Gmina: Krasocin

Population
  - Total: 373
- Time zone: UTC+1 (CET)
  - Summer (DST): UTC+2 (CEST)
- Vehicle registration: TLW
- Website: http://sulkow.xcx.pl/

Sułków [ˈsuu̯kuf] is a village in the administrative district of Gmina Krasocin, within Włoszczowa County, Świętokrzyskie Voivodeship, in south-central Poland. It lies approximately 3 km (2 mi) west of Krasocin, 9 km (6 mi) east of Włoszczowa, and 38 km (24 mi) west of the regional capital Kielce.

== History ==
Following the joint German-Soviet invasion of Poland, which started World War II in September 1939, Sułków was occupied by Germany until 1945. On 15 August 1943, in retaliation for the activities of Polish partisans, German gendarmes carried out a massacre of seven Poles from Sułków in the forest of nearby Wojciechów. The victims were initially buried at the site, and in 1945 they were buried at the cemetery in Krasocin.
