= Cieśle, Świętokrzyskie Voivodeship =

Cieśle
- Village
- Location within Poland
- Coordinates: 50°50′31″N 20°12′10″E
- Country: Poland
- Voivodeship: Świętokrzyskie
- County: Włoszczowa
- Gmina: Krasocin
- Population: 795

Cieśle [ˈt͡ɕɛɕlɛ] is a village in the administrative district of Gmina Krasocin, within Włoszczowa County, Świętokrzyskie Voivodeship, in south-central Poland. It lies approximately 8 km (5 mi) south-east of Krasocin, 17 km (11 mi) east of Włoszczowa, and 30 km (19 mi) west of the regional capital Kielce.
