= Krasów, Świętokrzyskie Voivodeship =

Krasów
- Village
- Location within Poland
- Coordinates: 50°44′8″N 20°0′27″E
- Country: Poland
- Voivodeship: Świętokrzyskie
- County: Włoszczowa
- Gmina: Radków

Krasów [ˈkrasuf] is a village in the administrative district of Gmina Radków, within Włoszczowa County, Świętokrzyskie Voivodeship, in south-central Poland. It lies approximately 3 km (2 mi) north-east of Radków, 14 km (9 mi) south of Włoszczowa, and 46 km (29 mi) west of the regional capital Kielce.
