= Nowiny-Dębnik =

- Village
- Location within Poland
- Coordinates: 50°41′32″N 19°58′48″E
- Country: Poland
- Voivodeship: Świętokrzyskie
- County: Włoszczowa
- Gmina: Radków

Nowiny-Dębnik [nɔˈvinɨ ˈdɛmbnik] is a village in the administrative district of Gmina Radków, within Włoszczowa County, Świętokrzyskie Voivodeship, in south-central Poland. It lies approximately 3 km (2 mi) south of Radków, 18 km (11 mi) south of Włoszczowa, and 50 km (31 mi) south-west of the regional capital Kielce.
