= Wojciechów, Włoszczowa County =

Wojciechów
- Village
- Location within Poland
- Coordinates: 50°55′37″N 20°10′22″E
- Country: Poland
- Voivodeship: Świętokrzyskie
- County: Włoszczowa
- Gmina: Krasocin

Population
  - Total: 142
- Time zone: UTC+1 (CET)
  - Summer (DST): UTC+2 (CEST)
- Vehicle registration: TLW

Wojciechów (Polish pronunciation: [vɔjˈt͡ɕɛxuf]) is a village in the administrative district of Gmina Krasocin, within Włoszczowa County, Świętokrzyskie Voivodeship, in south-central Poland. It lies approximately 6 km (4 mi) north-east of Krasocin, 17 km (11 mi) north-east of Włoszczowa, and 32 km (20 mi) west of the regional capital Kielce.

== History ==
Following the joint German-Soviet invasion of Poland, which started World War II in September 1939, it was occupied by Germany until 1945. On 15 August 1943, in retaliation for the activities of Polish partisans, German gendarmes carried out a massacre of seven Poles from the nearby village of Sułków at the local forest. The victims were initially buried at the site, and in 1945 they were buried at the cemetery in Krasocin.
