= Kwilina =

- Village
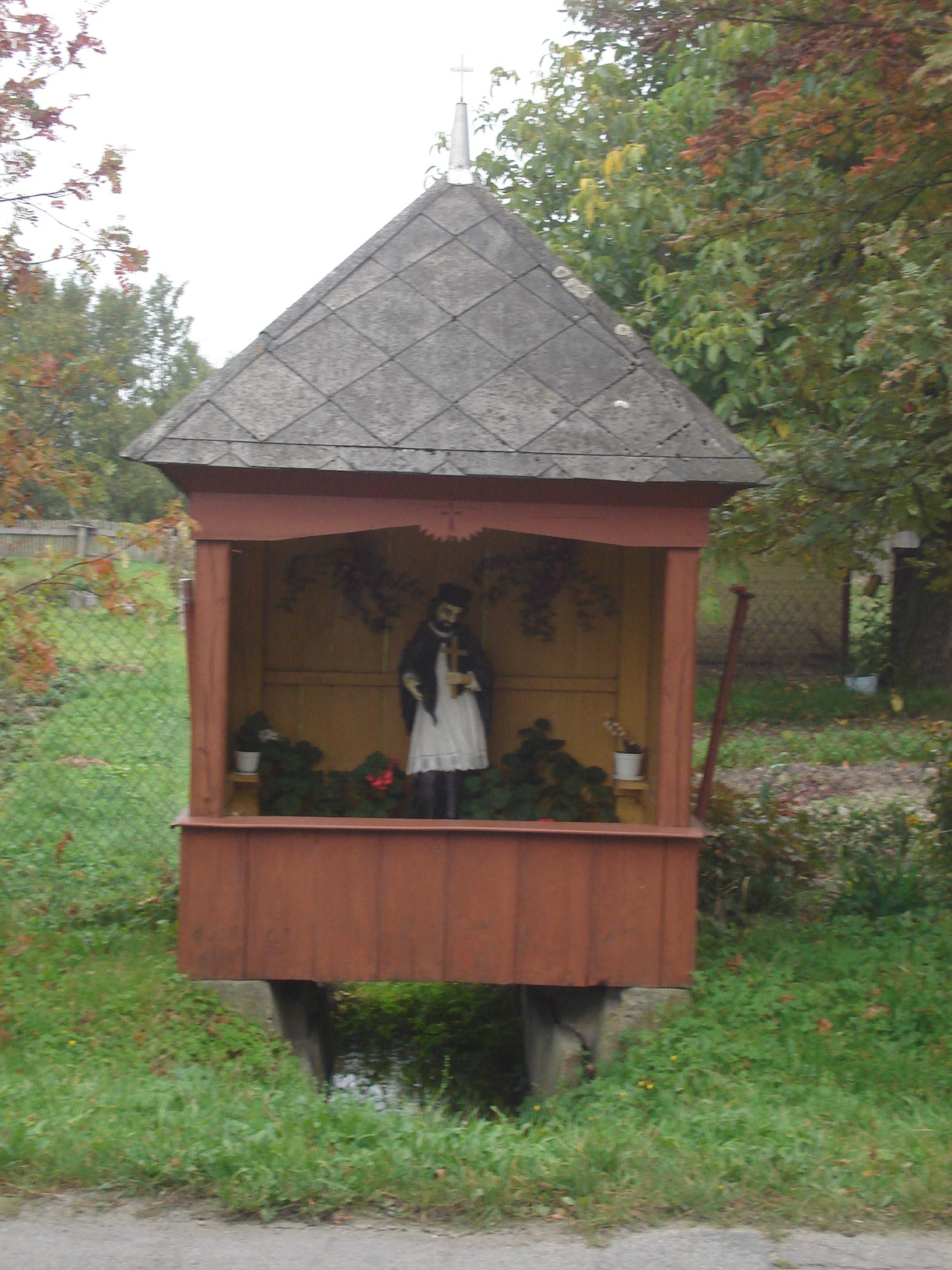

- Location within Poland
- Coordinates: 50°41′17″N 20°1′6″E
- Country: Poland
- Voivodeship: Świętokrzyskie
- County: Włoszczowa
- Gmina: Radków

Kwilina [kfiˈlina] is a village in the administrative district of Gmina Radków, within Włoszczowa County, Świętokrzyskie Voivodeship, in south-central Poland. It lies approximately 4 km (2 mi) south-east of Radków, 19 km (12 mi) south of Włoszczowa, and 48 km (30 mi) south-west of the regional capital Kielce.
