= Dąbrówka, Gmina Krasocin =

Dąbrówka
- Village
- Location within Poland
- Coordinates: 50°50′57″N 20°10′45″E
- Country: Poland
- Voivodeship: Świętokrzyskie
- County: Włoszczowa
- Gmina: Krasocin
- Population: 124

Dąbrówka [dɔmˈbrufka] is a village in the administrative district of Gmina Krasocin, within Włoszczowa County, Świętokrzyskie Voivodeship, in south-central Poland. It lies approximately 7 km (4 mi) south-east of Krasocin, 15 km (9 mi) east of Włoszczowa, and 31 km (19 mi) west of the regional capital Kielce.
