= Wola Świdzińska =

- Village
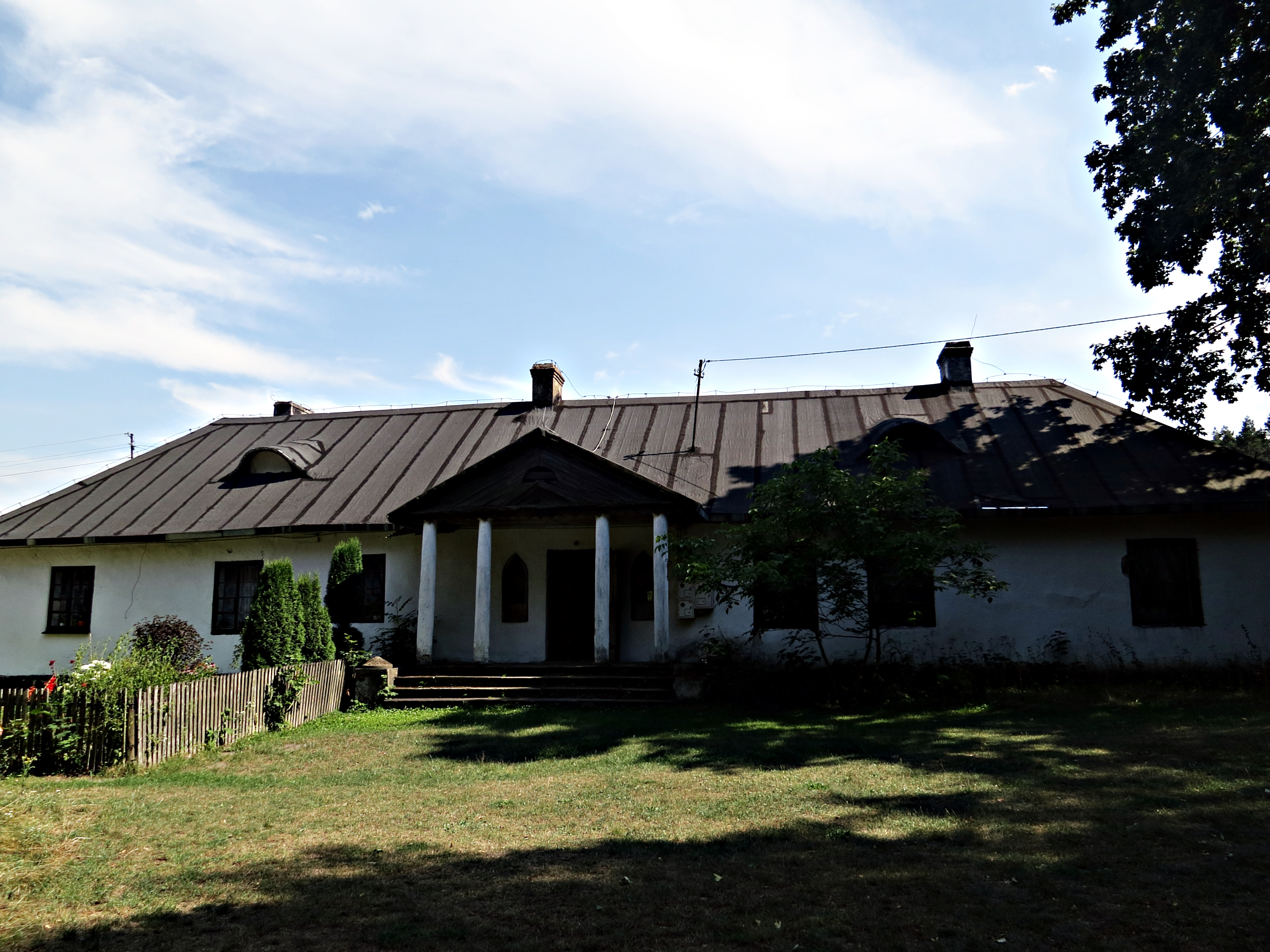
- Manor

- Location within Poland
- Coordinates: 50°55′38″N 20°4′34″E
- Country: Poland
- Voivodeship: Świętokrzyskie
- County: Włoszczowa
- Gmina: Krasocin
- Population: 156

Wola Świdzińska [ˈvɔla ɕfiˈd͡ʑiɲska] is a village in the administrative district of Gmina Krasocin, within Włoszczowa County, Świętokrzyskie Voivodeship, in south-central Poland. It lies approximately 6 km (4 mi) north-west of Krasocin, 12 km (7 mi) north-east of Włoszczowa, and 39 km (24 mi) west of the regional capital Kielce.
