= Sulików, Świętokrzyskie Voivodeship =

Sulików
- Village
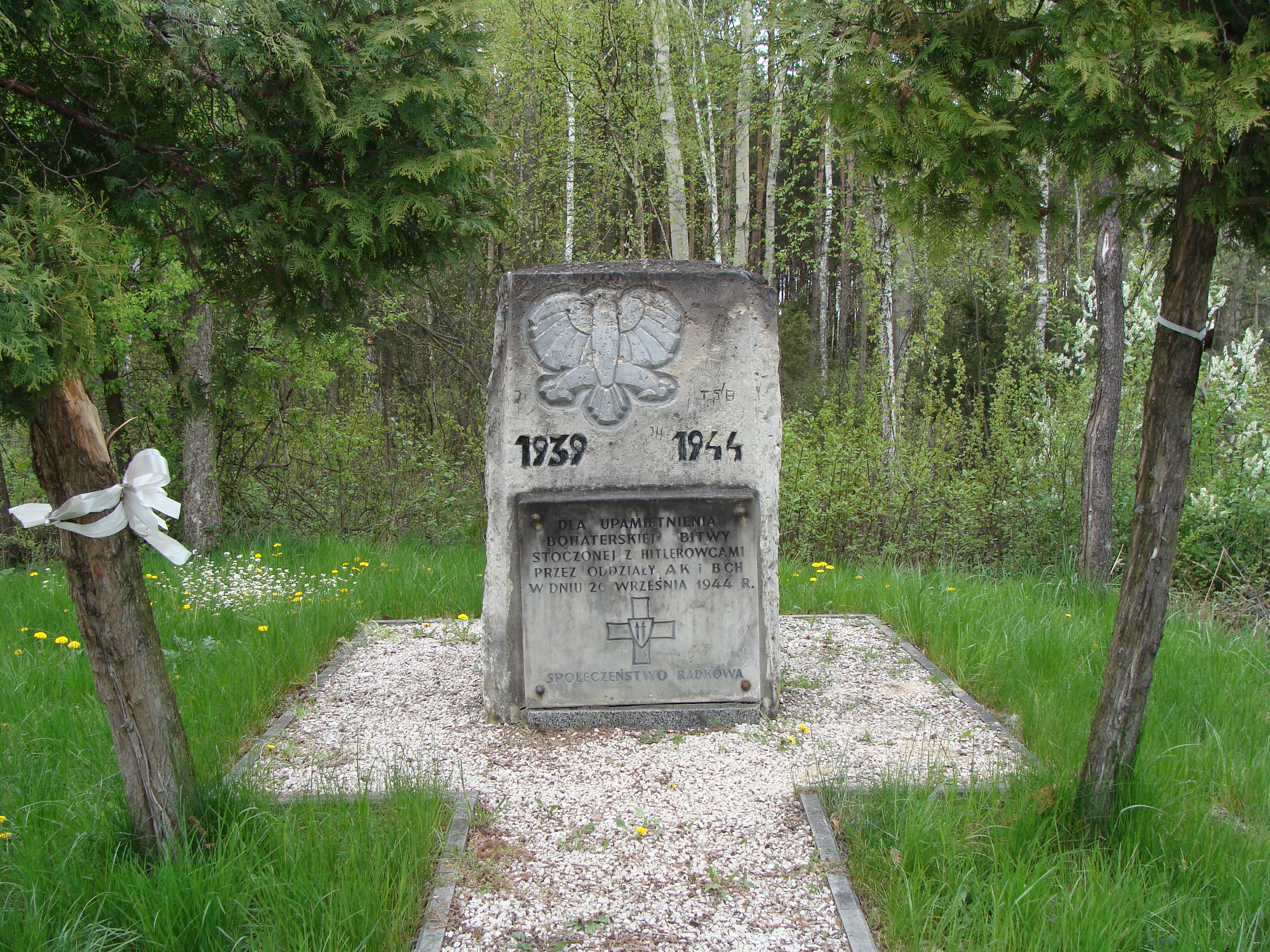

- Location within Poland
- Coordinates: 50°44′17″N 19°58′49″E
- Country: Poland
- Voivodeship: Świętokrzyskie
- County: Włoszczowa
- Gmina: Radków

Sulików [suˈlikuf] is a village in the administrative district of Gmina Radków, within Włoszczowa County, Świętokrzyskie Voivodeship, in south-central Poland. It lies approximately 3 km (2 mi) north of Radków, 13 km (8 mi) south of Włoszczowa, and 48 km (30 mi) west of the regional capital Kielce.
