= Lipia Góra, Świętokrzyskie Voivodeship =

Lipia Góra
- Village
- Location within Poland
- Coordinates: 50°56′N 20°9′E
- Country: Poland
- Voivodeship: Świętokrzyskie
- County: Włoszczowa
- Gmina: Krasocin
- Population: 120

Lipia Góra [ˈlipja ˈɡura] is a village in the administrative district of Gmina Krasocin, within Włoszczowa County, Świętokrzyskie Voivodeship, in south-central Poland. It lies approximately 6 km (4 mi) north-east of Krasocin, 16 km (10 mi) north-east of Włoszczowa, and 34 km (21 mi) west of the regional capital Kielce.
