= Karolinów, Świętokrzyskie Voivodeship =

Karolinów
- Village
- Location within Poland
- Coordinates: 50°54′59″N 20°10′15″E
- Country: Poland
- Voivodeship: Świętokrzyskie
- County: Włoszczowa
- Gmina: Krasocin
- Population: 207

Karolinów [karɔˈlinuf] is a village in the administrative district of Gmina Krasocin, within Włoszczowa County, Świętokrzyskie Voivodeship, in south-central Poland. It lies approximately 5 km (3 mi) north-east of Krasocin, 16 km (10 mi) north-east of Włoszczowa, and 32 km (20 mi) west of the regional capital Kielce.
