= Oleszno, Świętokrzyskie Voivodeship =

Oleszno
- Village
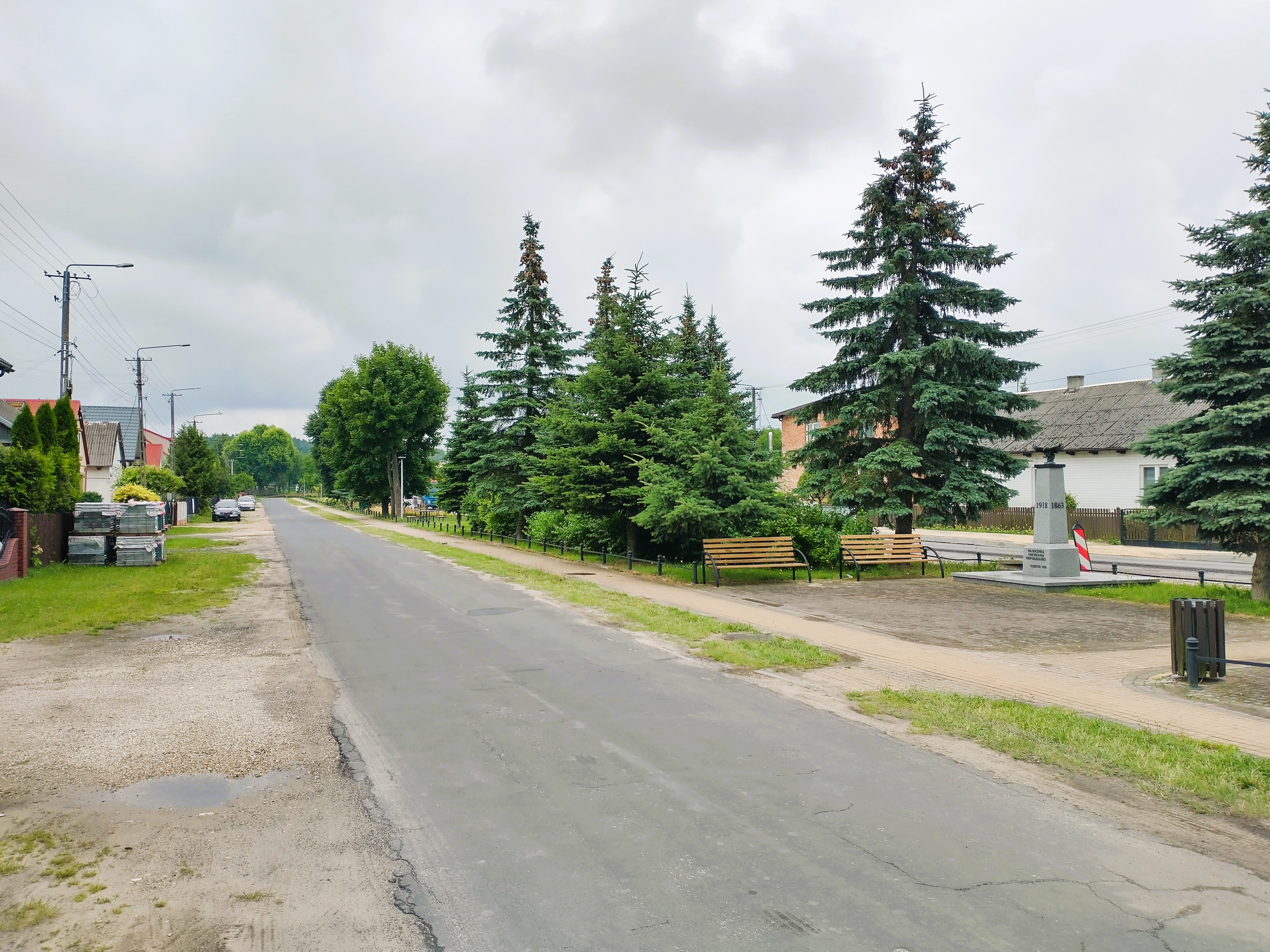

- Location within Poland
- Coordinates: 50°56′33″N 20°2′44″E
- Country: Poland
- Voivodeship: Świętokrzyskie
- County: Włoszczowa
- Gmina: Krasocin
- Population: 1,117

Oleszno [ɔˈlɛʂnɔ] is a village in the administrative district of Gmina Krasocin, within Włoszczowa County, Świętokrzyskie Voivodeship, in south-central Poland. It lies approximately 8 km (5 mi) north-west of Krasocin, 12 km (7 mi) north-east of Włoszczowa, and 41 km (25 mi) west of the regional capital Kielce.
