= Bałków =

- Village
- Location within Poland
- Coordinates: 50°43′25″N 19°55′29″E
- Country: Poland
- Voivodeship: Świętokrzyskie
- County: Włoszczowa
- Gmina: Radków
- Population: 420

Bałków [ˈbau̯kuf] is a village in the administrative district of Gmina Radków, within Włoszczowa County, Świętokrzyskie Voivodeship, in south-central Poland. It lies approximately 5 km (3 mi) west of Radków, 15 km (9 mi) south of Włoszczowa, and 52 km (32 mi) west of the regional capital Kielce.
