= Bieganów, Świętokrzyskie Voivodeship =

Bieganów
- Village
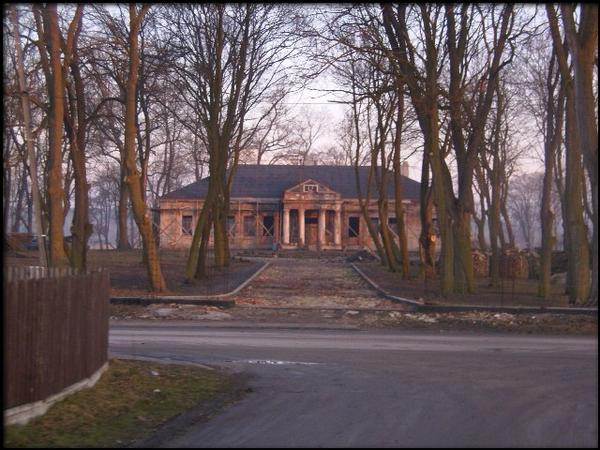
- Palace

- Location within Poland
- Coordinates: 50°42′37″N 19°54′8″E
- Country: Poland
- Voivodeship: Świętokrzyskie
- County: Włoszczowa
- Gmina: Radków

Bieganów [bjɛˈɡanuf] is a village in the administrative district of Gmina Radków, within Włoszczowa County, Świętokrzyskie Voivodeship, in south-central Poland. It lies approximately 6 km (4 mi) west of Radków, 17 km (11 mi) south of Włoszczowa, and 54 km (34 mi) west of the regional capital Kielce.
