= Żeleźnica =

Żeleźnica may refer to the following places:

- Żeleźnica, Greater Poland Voivodeship (west-central Poland)
- Żeleźnica, Łódź Voivodeship (central Poland)
- Żeleźnica, Świętokrzyskie Voivodeship (south-central Poland)
- Żeleźnica, Lubusz Voivodeship (west Poland)
