= Dąbrówki, Świętokrzyskie Voivodeship =

Dąbrówki
- Village
- Location within Poland
- Coordinates: 50°58′12″N 20°4′0″E
- Country: Poland
- Voivodeship: Świętokrzyskie
- County: Włoszczowa
- Gmina: Krasocin
- Population: 76

Dąbrówki (Polish pronunciation: [dɔmˈbrufkʲi]) is a village in the administrative district of Gmina Krasocin, within Włoszczowa County, Świętokrzyskie Voivodeship, in south-central Poland. It lies approximately 10 km (6 mi) north of Krasocin, 15 km (9 mi) north-east of Włoszczowa, and 40 km (25 mi) west of the regional capital Kielce.
