= Żeleźnica, Świętokrzyskie Voivodeship =

Żeleźnica
- Village
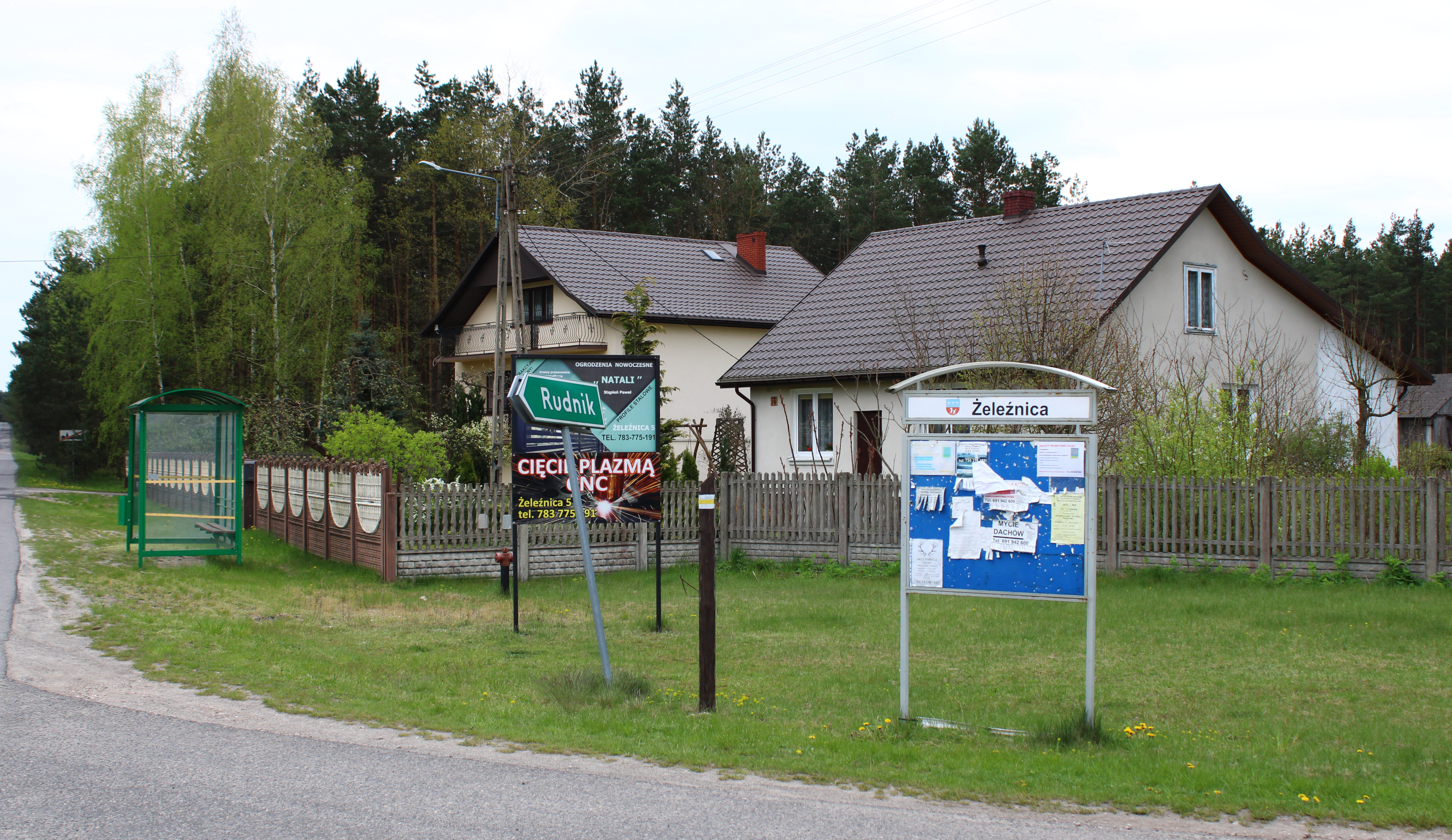

- Location within Poland
- Coordinates: 50°58′10″N 20°3′0″E
- Country: Poland
- Voivodeship: Świętokrzyskie
- County: Włoszczowa
- Gmina: Krasocin
- Population: 52

Żeleźnica [ʐɛlɛʑˈnit͡sa] is a village in the administrative district of Gmina Krasocin, within Włoszczowa County, Świętokrzyskie Voivodeship, in south-central Poland. It lies approximately 11 km (7 mi) north-west of Krasocin, 15 km (9 mi) north-east of Włoszczowa, and 41 km (25 mi) west of the regional capital Kielce.
