= Gruszczyn, Świętokrzyskie Voivodeship =

Gruszczyn
- Village
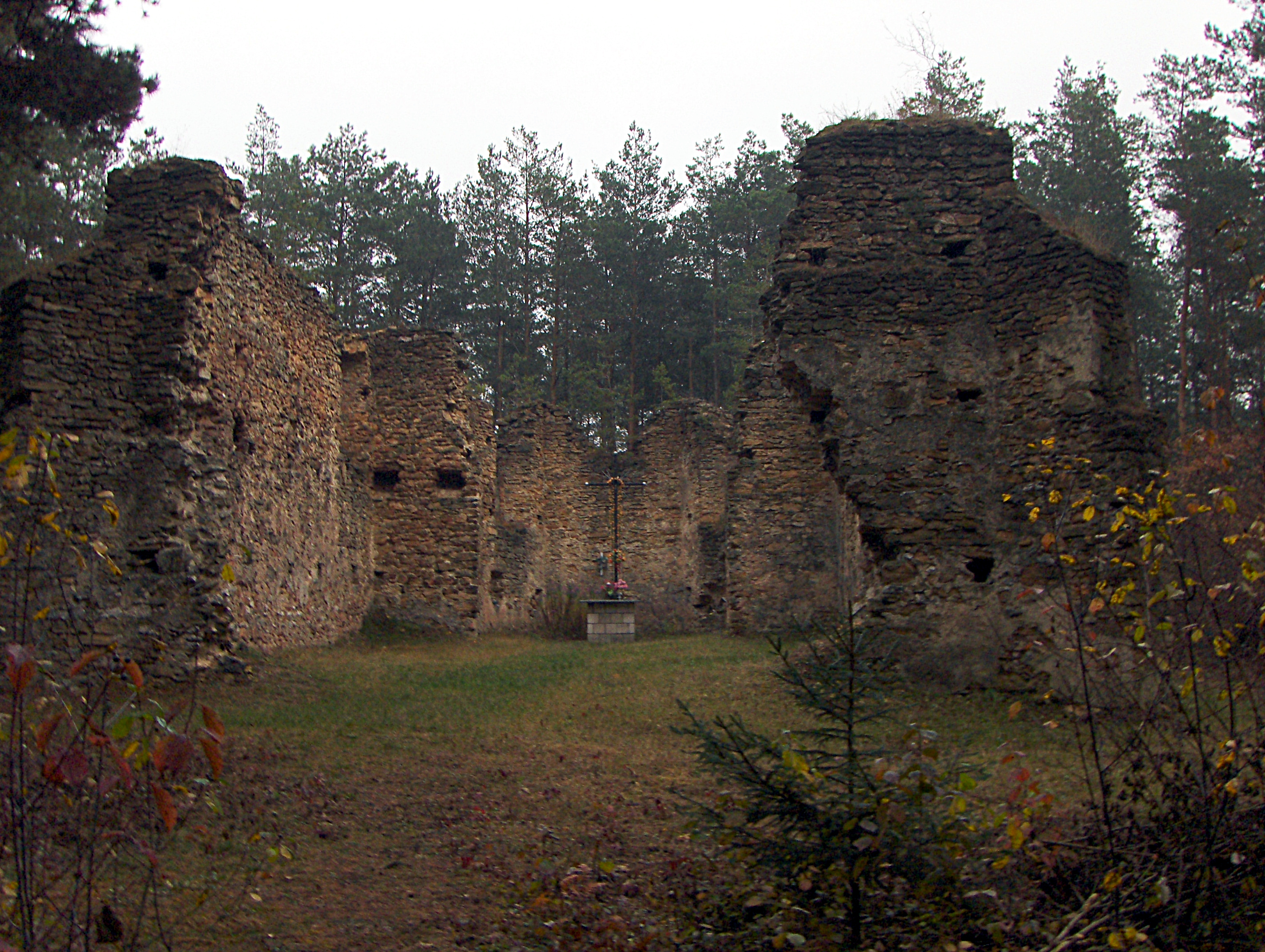
- Church ruins

- Location within Poland
- Coordinates: 50°52′22″N 20°9′37″E
- Country: Poland
- Voivodeship: Świętokrzyskie
- County: Włoszczowa
- Gmina: Krasocin
- Population: 284

Gruszczyn [ˈɡruʂt͡ʂɨn] is a village in the administrative district of Gmina Krasocin, within Włoszczowa County, Świętokrzyskie Voivodeship, in south-central Poland. It lies approximately 4 km (2 mi) south-east of Krasocin, 14 km (9 mi) east of Włoszczowa, and 33 km (21 mi) west of the regional capital Kielce.
