= Świdno, Świętokrzyskie Voivodeship =

Świdno
- Village
- Location within Poland
- Coordinates: 50°55′17″N 20°5′24″E
- Country: Poland
- Voivodeship: Świętokrzyskie
- County: Włoszczowa
- Gmina: Krasocin
- Population: 380

Świdno [ˈɕfidnɔ] is a village in the administrative district of Gmina Krasocin, within Włoszczowa County, Świętokrzyskie Voivodeship, in south-central Poland. It lies approximately 5 km (3 mi) north-west of Krasocin, 12 km (7 mi) north-east of Włoszczowa, and 38 km (24 mi) west of the regional capital Kielce.
