= Zabrody =

Zabrody may refer to the following places:

- Zabrody, Podlaskie Voivodeship (north-east Poland)
- Zabrody, Pomeranian Voivodeship
- Zabrody, Gmina Karsin in Pomeranian Voivodeship (north Poland)
- Zabrody, Świętokrzyskie Voivodeship (south-central Poland)
- Zabrody, Ratne Raion (Ukraine)
