= Kajetanów =

Kajetanów may refer to the following places:

- Kajetanów, Łódź Voivodeship (central Poland)
- Kajetanów, Lublin County in Lublin Voivodeship (east Poland)
- Kajetanów, Puławy County in Lublin Voivodeship (east Poland)
- Kajetanów, Świętokrzyskie Voivodeship (south-central Poland)
- Kajetanów, Masovian Voivodeship (east-central Poland)
