= Gmina Krasocin =

Gmina Krasocin Krasocin Commune
- Gmina
- Flag Coat of arms
- Interactive map of Gmina Krasocin
- Coordinates (Krasocin): 50°53′21″N 20°7′3″E
- Country: Poland
- Voivodeship: Świętokrzyskie
- County: Włoszczowa
- Seat: Krasocin

Area
  - Total: 193.89 km^{2} (74.86 sq mi)

Population (2006)
  - Total: 10,751
  - Density: 55.449/km^{2} (143.61/sq mi)
- Postal code: 29-105
- Area code: +48 41
- Car plates: TLW
- Website: http://www.krasocin.com.pl/

Gmina Krasocin is a rural gmina (administrative district) in Włoszczowa County, Świętokrzyskie Voivodeship, in south-central Poland. Its seat is the village of Krasocin, which lies approximately 12 kilometres (7 mi) east of Włoszczowa and 36 km (22 mi) west of the regional capital Kielce.

The gmina covers an area of 193.89 square kilometres (74.9 sq mi), and as of 2006 its total population is 10,751.

The gmina contains part of the protected area called Przedbórz Landscape Park.

== Villages ==
Gmina Krasocin contains the villages and settlements of Belina, Borowiec, Brygidów, Bukowa, Chałupki, Chotów, Cieśle, Czostków, Dąbrówka, Dąbrówki, Gruszczyn, Huta Stara, Jakubów, Karolinów, Kozia Wieś, Krasocin, Lipia Góra, Lipie, Ludynia, Mieczyn, Niwiska Gruszczyńskie, Niwiska Krasocińskie, Nowy Dwór, Ogrojce, Oleszno, Ostra Górka, Ostrów, Podlesko, Porąbki, Rogalów, Rudnik, Skorków, Stojewsko, Sułków, Świdno, Wielkopole, Wojciechów, Wola Świdzińska, Występy, Zabrody and Żeleźnica.

== Neighbouring gminas ==
Gmina Krasocin is bordered by the gminas of Kluczewsko, Łopuszno, Małogoszcz, Przedbórz, Słupia and Włoszczowa.
