= Ogrojce =

- Village
- Location within Poland
- Coordinates: 50°53′38″N 20°10′15″E
- Country: Poland
- Voivodeship: Świętokrzyskie
- County: Włoszczowa
- Gmina: Krasocin

Ogrojce [ɔˈɡrɔi̯t͡sɛ] is a village in the administrative district of Gmina Krasocin, within Włoszczowa County, Świętokrzyskie Voivodeship, in south-central Poland.
