= Rudnik, Włoszczowa County =

Rudnik
- Village
- Location within Poland
- Coordinates: 50°58′10″N 20°02′13″E
- Country: Poland
- Voivodeship: Świętokrzyskie
- County: Włoszczowa
- Gmina: Krasocin
- Population: 9

Rudnik (Polish pronunciation: [ˈrudɲik]) is a village in the administrative district of Gmina Krasocin, within Włoszczowa County, Świętokrzyskie Voivodeship, in south-central Poland.
