= Gruszczyn =

Gruszczyn may refer to the following places:

- Gruszczyn, Kozienice County in Masovian Voivodeship (east-central Poland)
- Gruszczyn, Lipsko County in Masovian Voivodeship (east-central Poland)
- Gruszczyn, Świętokrzyskie Voivodeship (south-central Poland)
- Gruszczyn, Greater Poland Voivodeship (west-central Poland)
