= Porąbki, Włoszczowa County =

Porąbki
- Village
- Location within Poland
- Coordinates: 50°55′21″N 20°06′55″E
- Country: Poland
- Voivodeship: Świętokrzyskie
- County: Włoszczowa
- Gmina: Krasocin
- Population: 33

Porąbki [pɔˈrɔmpki] is a village in the administrative district of Gmina Krasocin, within Włoszczowa County, Świętokrzyskie Voivodeship, in south-central Poland.
