= Ostra Górka, Świętokrzyskie Voivodeship =

Ostra Górka
- Village
- Location within Poland
- Coordinates: 50°56′13″N 20°07′17″E
- Country: Poland
- Voivodeship: Świętokrzyskie
- County: Włoszczowa
- Gmina: Krasocin
- Population: 63

Ostra Górka [ˈɔstra ˈɡurka] is a village in the administrative district of Gmina Krasocin, within Włoszczowa County, Świętokrzyskie Voivodeship, in south-central Poland.
