= Bieganów =

Bieganów may refer to the following places in Poland:

- Bieganów, Lower Silesian Voivodeship (south-west Poland)
- Bieganów, Świętokrzyskie Voivodeship (south-central Poland)
- Bieganów, Masovian Voivodeship (east-central Poland)
- Bieganów, Lubusz Voivodeship (west Poland)
