= Balkow =

Balkow may refer to:

- Balków, Łódź Voivodeship, Poland
- Bałków, Świętokrzyskie Voivodeship, Poland
