= Świdno =

Świdno may refer to the following places:

- Świdno, Lublin Voivodeship (east Poland)
- Świdno, Grójec County in Masovian Voivodeship (east-central Poland)
- Świdno, Świętokrzyskie Voivodeship (south-central Poland)
- Świdno, Węgrów County in Masovian Voivodeship (east-central Poland)
