= Przedbórz Landscape Park =

Place in Poland

Coordinates: 50°59′20″N 20°04′10″E

- Przedborski Park Krajobrazowy
- IUCN category V (protected landscape/seascape)
- Interactive map of Przedbórz Landscape Park
- Location: Central Poland
- Area: 166.40 km^{2} (64.25 sq mi)
- Established: 1988

Przedbórz Landscape Park (Przedborski Park Krajobrazowy) is a protected area (landscape park) in central Poland, established in 1988, covering an area of 166.40 square kilometres (64.25 sq mi).

The Park is shared between two voivodeships: Łódź Voivodeship and Świętokrzyskie Voivodeship. Within Łódź Voivodeship it lies in Radomsko County (Gmina Przedbórz, Gmina Wielgomłyny, Gmina Masłowice, Gmina Żytno). Within Świętokrzyskie Voivodeship it lies in Kielce County (Gmina Łopuszno), Końskie County (Gmina Fałków, Gmina Słupia) and Włoszczowa County (Gmina Kluczewsko, Gmina Krasocin).

There are five nature reserves within the park.

It is one of seven landscape parks in the region.
