= Niwiska Gruszczyńskie =

Village in Gmina Krasocin, Poland

- Village
- Location within Poland
- Coordinates: 50°51′58″N 20°09′31″E
- Country: Poland
- Voivodeship: Świętokrzyskie
- County: Włoszczowa
- Gmina: Krasocin

Niwiska Gruszczyńskie [niˈviska ɡruʂˈt͡ʂɨɲskʲɛ] is a village in the administrative district of Gmina Krasocin, within Włoszczowa County, Świętokrzyskie Voivodeship, in south-central Poland.
