= Sulików =

Sulików may refer to:

- Sulików, Lower Silesian Voivodeship (south-west Poland)
- Sulików, Świętokrzyskie Voivodeship (south-central Poland)
