= Dąbrówki =

Dąbrówki may refer to the following places:

- Dąbrówki, Podlaskie Voivodeship (north-east Poland)
- Dąbrówki, Subcarpathian Voivodeship (south-east Poland)
- Dąbrówki, Świętokrzyskie Voivodeship (south-central Poland)
- Dąbrówki, Gmina Kozienice in Masovian Voivodeship (east-central Poland)
- Dąbrówki, Gmina Głowaczów in Masovian Voivodeship (east-central Poland)
- Dąbrówki, Gmina Grabów nad Pilicą in Masovian Voivodeship (east-central Poland)
- Dąbrówki, Sierpc County in Masovian Voivodeship (east-central Poland)
- Dąbrówki, Żuromin County in Masovian Voivodeship (east-central Poland)
