= Karolinów =

Karolinów may refer to the following places:

- Karolinów, Piotrków County in Łódź Voivodeship (central Poland)
- Karolinów, Gmina Tomaszów Mazowiecki in Łódź Voivodeship (central Poland)
- Karolinów, Lublin Voivodeship (east Poland)
- Karolinów, Gmina Żelechlinek in Łódź Voivodeship (central Poland)
- Karolinów, Świętokrzyskie Voivodeship (south-central Poland)
- Karolinów, Garwolin County in Masovian Voivodeship (east-central Poland)
- Karolinów, Wyszków County in Masovian Voivodeship (east-central Poland)
