= Niwiska Krasocińskie =

Village in Gmina Krasocin, Poland

- Village
- Location within Poland
- Coordinates: 50°52′02″N 20°08′29″E
- Country: Poland
- Voivodeship: Świętokrzyskie
- County: Włoszczowa
- Gmina: Krasocin
- Population: 31

Niwiska Krasocińskie [niˈviska krasɔˈt͡ɕiɲskʲɛ] is a village in the administrative district of Gmina Krasocin, within Włoszczowa County, Świętokrzyskie Voivodeship, in south-central Poland.
