= Wielkopole, Włoszczowa County =

Wielkopole
- Village
- Location within Poland
- Coordinates: 50°52′25″N 20°06′14″E
- Country: Poland
- Voivodeship: Świętokrzyskie
- County: Włoszczowa
- Gmina: Krasocin
- Population: 29

Wielkopole [vjɛlkɔˈpɔlɛ] is a village that is located in the administrative district of Gmina Krasocin, within Włoszczowa County, Świętokrzyskie Voivodeship, in south-central Poland.
