= Lipia Góra =

Lipia Góra may refer to the following places:

- Lipia Góra, Greater Poland Voivodeship (west-central Poland)
- Lipia Góra, Pomeranian Voivodeship (north Poland)
- Lipia Góra, Świętokrzyskie Voivodeship (south-central Poland)
