= Gmina Radków =

Gmina Radków may refer to either of the following administrative districts in Poland:

- Gmina Radków, Lower Silesian Voivodeship
- Gmina Radków, Świętokrzyskie Voivodeship
