= Oleszno =

Oleszno may refer to the following places:

- Oleszno, Greater Poland Voivodeship (west-central Poland)
- Oleszno, Kuyavian-Pomeranian Voivodeship (north-central Poland)
- Oleszno, Świętokrzyskie Voivodeship (south-central Poland)
- Oleszno, West Pomeranian Voivodeship (north-west Poland)
