= Zagacie =

Zagacie may refer to the following places:

- Zagacie, Lesser Poland Voivodeship (south Poland)
- Zagacie, Łódź Voivodeship (central Poland)
- Zagacie, Lublin Voivodeship (east Poland)
- Zagacie, Silesian Voivodeship (south Poland)
