= Brzostek (disambiguation) =

Brzostek is a town in south-eastern Poland.

Brzostek may also refer to the following villages:

- Brzostek, Greater Poland Voivodeship (west-central Poland)
- Brzostek, Łódź Voivodeship (central Poland)
- Brzostek, Silesian Voivodeship (south Poland)
