= Góry Mokre =

Goku Mokre
- Village
- Location within Poland
- Coordinates: 51°1′16″N 20°0′7″E
- Country: Poland
- Voivodeship: Łódź
- County: Radomsko
- Gmina: Przedbórz

Góry Mokre [ˈɡurɨ ˈmɔkrɛ] is a village in the administrative district of Gmina Przedbórz, within Radomsko County, Łódź Voivodeship, in central Poland.
