= Miejskie Pola =

- Village
- Location within Poland
- Coordinates: 51°4′38″N 19°53′7″E
- Country: Poland
- Voivodeship: Łódź
- County: Radomsko
- Gmina: Przedbórz

Miejskie Pola [ˈmjɛi̯skʲɛ ˈpɔla] is a village in the administrative district of Gmina Przedbórz, within Radomsko County, Łódź Voivodeship, in central Poland.
