= Góry Suche, Łódź Voivodeship =

Góry Suche
- Village
- Location within Poland
- Coordinates: 51°1′42″N 19°58′52″E
- Country: Poland
- Voivodeship: Łódź
- County: Radomsko
- Gmina: Przedbórz

Góry Suche [ˈɡurɨ ˈsuxɛ] is a village in the administrative district of Gmina Przedbórz, within Radomsko County, Łódź Voivodeship, in central Poland.
