= Grobla, Radomsko County =

Grobla
- Village
- Location within Poland
- Coordinates: 51°6′2″N 19°54′13″E
- Country: Poland
- Voivodeship: Łódź
- County: Radomsko
- Gmina: Przedbórz

Grobla [ˈɡrɔbla] is a village in the administrative district of Gmina Przedbórz, within Radomsko County, Łódź Voivodeship, in central Poland.
