= Stara Wieś, Radomsko County =

Stara Wieś
- Village
- Location within Poland
- Coordinates: 50°59′45″N 19°59′7″E
- Country: Poland
- Voivodeship: Łódź
- County: Radomsko
- Gmina: Przedbórz

Stara Wieś [ˈstara ˈvjɛɕ] is a village in the administrative district of Gmina Przedbórz, within Radomsko County, Łódź Voivodeship, in central Poland.
