= Wymysłów, Gmina Przedbórz =

Wymysłów
- Village
- Location within Poland
- Coordinates: 51°2′39″N 19°53′57″E
- Country: Poland
- Voivodeship: Łódź
- County: Radomsko
- Gmina: Przedbórz

Wymysłów [vɨˈmɨswuf] is a village in the administrative district of Gmina Przedbórz, within Radomsko County, Łódź Voivodeship, in central Poland.
