= Józefów, Gmina Przedbórz =

Józefów
- Village
- Location within Poland
- Coordinates: 51°1′10″N 19°57′12″E
- Country: Poland
- Voivodeship: Łódź
- County: Radomsko
- Gmina: Przedbórz

Józefów (Polish pronunciation: [juˈzɛfuf]) is a village in the administrative district of Gmina Przedbórz, within Radomsko County, Łódź Voivodeship, in central Poland.
