= Piskorzeniec =

- Village
- Location within Poland
- Coordinates: 51°4′N 20°2′E
- Country: Poland
- Voivodeship: Łódź
- County: Radomsko
- Gmina: Przedbórz

Piskorzeniec [piskɔˈʐɛɲɛt͡s] is a village in the administrative district of Gmina Przedbórz, within Radomsko County, Łódź Voivodeship, in central Poland.
