= Kaleń, Radomsko County =

Kaleń
- Village
- Location within Poland
- Coordinates: 51°2′44″N 19°57′59″E
- Country: Poland
- Voivodeship: Łódź
- County: Radomsko
- Gmina: Przedbórz

Kaleń [ˈkalɛɲ] is a village in the administrative district of Gmina Przedbórz, within Radomsko County, Łódź Voivodeship, in central Poland.
