= Stary Józefów, Radomsko County =

Stary Józefów
- Village
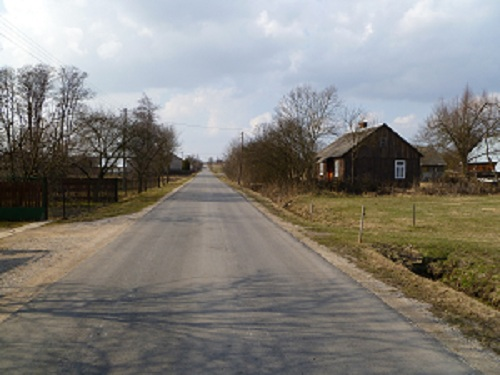

- Location within Poland
- Coordinates: 51°10′53″N 19°57′39″E
- Country: Poland
- Voivodeship: Łódź
- County: Radomsko
- Gmina: Przedbórz

Stary Józefów (Polish pronunciation: [ˈstarɨ juˈzɛfuf]) is a village in the administrative district of Gmina Przedbórz, within Radomsko County, Łódź Voivodeship, in central Poland.
