= Gmina Przedbórz =

Gmina Przedbórz Przedbórz Commune
- Gmina
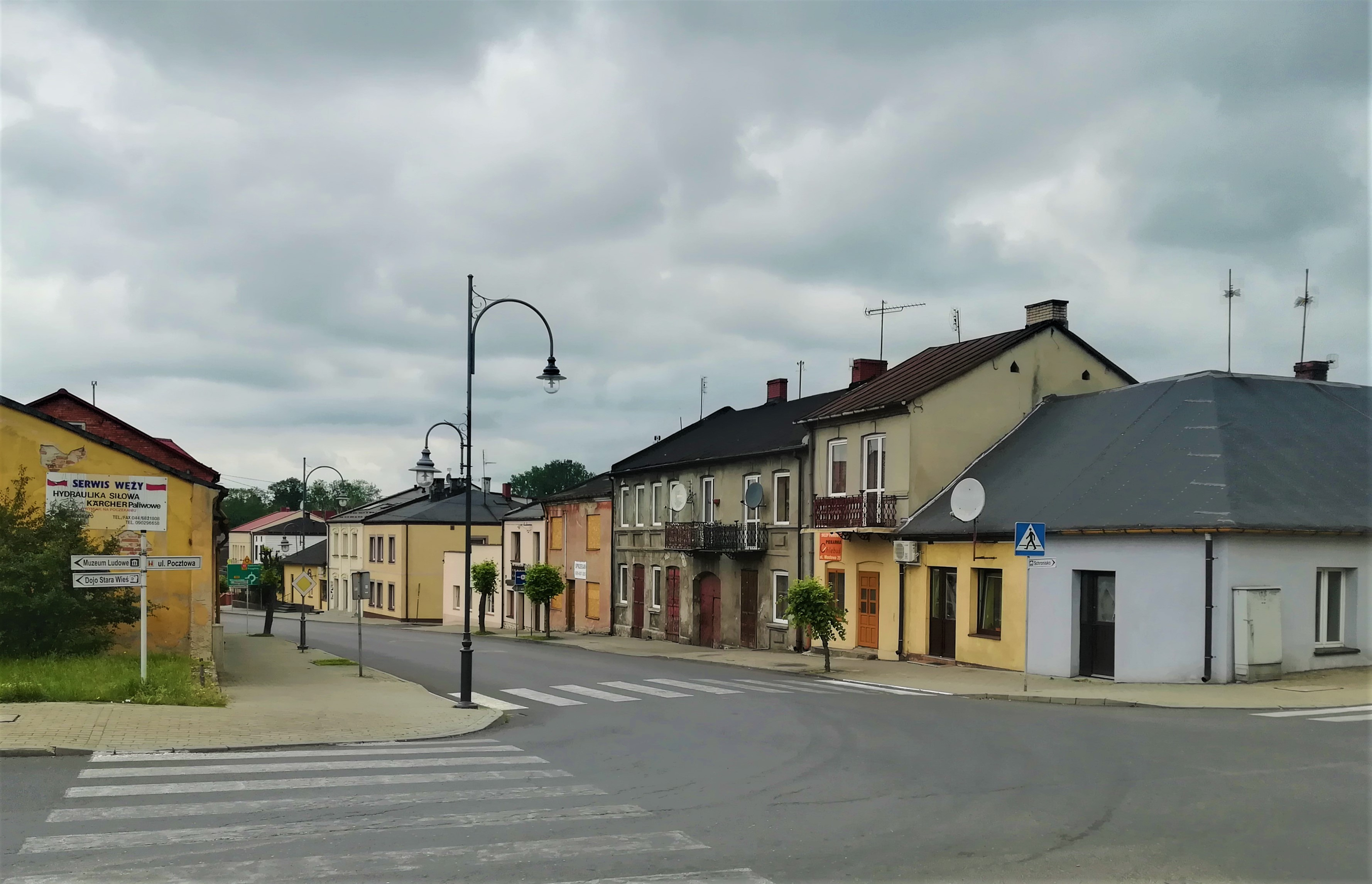

- Coat of arms

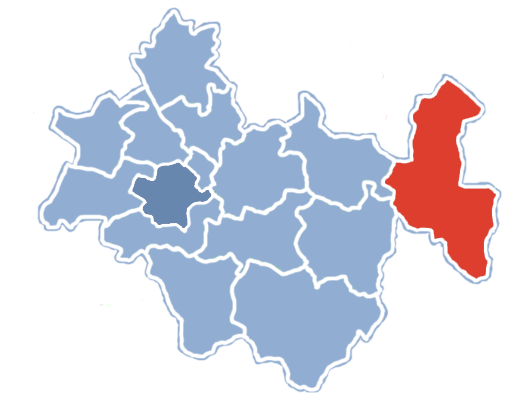
- Coordinates (Przedbórz): 51°5′N 19°53′E
- Country: Poland
- Voivodeship: Łódź
- County: Radomsko
- Seat: Przedbórz

Area
  - Total: 189.94 km^{2} (73.34 sq mi)

Population (2006)
  - Total: 7,595
  - Density: 39.99/km^{2} (103.6/sq mi)
  - Urban: 3,758
  - Rural: 3,837
- Website: www.umprzedborz.com.pl

Gmina Przedbórz is an urban-rural gmina (administrative district) in Radomsko County, Łódź Voivodeship, in central Poland. Its seat is the town of Przedbórz, which lies approximately 31 kilometres (19 mi) east of Radomsko and 83 km (52 mi) south of the regional capital Łódź.

The gmina covers an area of 189.94 square kilometres (73.3 sq mi), and as of 2006 its total population is 7,595 (out of which the population of Przedbórz amounts to 3,758, and the population of the rural part of the gmina is 3,837).

The gmina contains part of the protected area called Przedbórz Landscape Park.

== Villages ==
Apart from the town of Przedbórz, Gmina Przedbórz contains the villages and settlements of Borowa, Brzostek, Chałupki, Faliszew, Gaj, Góry Mokre, Góry Suche, Grobla, Jabłonna, Józefów, Kajetanów, Kaleń, Miejskie Pola, Mojżeszów, Nosalewice, Piskorzeniec, Policzko, Przyłanki, Stara Wieś, Stary Józefów, Taras, Wojciechów, Wola Przedborska, Wygwizdów, Wymysłów, Zagacie, Żeleźnica and Zuzowy.

== Neighbouring gminas ==
Gmina Przedbórz is bordered by the gminas of Aleksandrów, Fałków, Kluczewsko, Krasocin, Masłowice, Ręczno, Słupia and Wielgomłyny.
