= Zuzowy =

- Village
- Location within Poland
- Coordinates: 51°8′N 19°58′E
- Country: Poland
- Voivodeship: Łódź
- County: Radomsko
- Gmina: Przedbórz
- Population: 180

Zuzowy [zuˈzɔvɨ] is a village in the administrative district of Gmina Przedbórz, within Radomsko County, Łódź Voivodeship, in central Poland.
