= Wojciechów, Gmina Przedbórz =

Wojciechów
- Village
- Location within Poland
- Coordinates: 51°3′49″N 19°58′43″E
- Country: Poland
- Voivodeship: Łódź
- County: Radomsko
- Gmina: Przedbórz

Wojciechów (Polish pronunciation: [vɔjˈt͡ɕɛxuf]) is a village in the administrative district of Gmina Przedbórz, within Radomsko County, Łódź Voivodeship, in central Poland.
