= Gaj, Radomsko County =

Gaj
- Village
- Location within Poland
- Coordinates: 51°01′47″N 19°58′15″E
- Country: Poland
- Voivodeship: Łódź
- County: Radomsko
- Gmina: Przedbórz

Gaj [ɡai̯] is a village in the administrative district of Gmina Przedbórz, within Radomsko County, Łódź Voivodeship, in central Poland.
