= Borowa, Gmina Przedbórz =

Borowa
- Village
- Location within Poland
- Coordinates: 51°3′19″N 20°0′2″E
- Country: Poland
- Voivodeship: Łódź
- County: Radomsko
- Gmina: Przedbórz

Borowa [bɔˈrɔva] is a village in the administrative district of Gmina Przedbórz, within Radomsko County, Łódź Voivodeship, in central Poland.
