= Taras, Łódź Voivodeship =

Taras
- Village
- Location within Poland
- Coordinates: 51°8′N 19°55′E
- Country: Poland
- Voivodeship: Łódź
- County: Radomsko
- Gmina: Przedbórz

Taras [ˈtaras] is a village in the administrative district of Gmina Przedbórz, within Radomsko County, Łódź Voivodeship, in central Poland.
