= Policzko =

- Village
- Location within Poland
- Coordinates: 51°3′N 19°57′E
- Country: Poland
- Voivodeship: Łódź
- County: Radomsko
- Gmina: Przedbórz

Policzko [pɔˈlit͡ʂkɔ] is a village in the administrative district of Gmina Przedbórz, within Radomsko County, Łódź Voivodeship, in central Poland.
