= Faliszew =

- Village
- Location within Poland
- Coordinates: 51°9′49″N 19°54′59″E
- Country: Poland
- Voivodeship: Łódź
- County: Radomsko
- Gmina: Przedbórz

Faliszew [faˈliʂɛf] is a village in the administrative district of Gmina Przedbórz, within Radomsko County, Łódź Voivodeship, in central Poland.
