= Gmina Radków, Świętokrzyskie Voivodeship =

Gmina Radków Radków Commune
- Gmina
- Flag Coat of arms
- Interactive map of Gmina Radków
- Coordinates (Radków): 50°42′48″N 19°59′7″E
- Country: Poland
- Voivodeship: Świętokrzyskie
- County: Włoszczowa
- Seat: Radków

Area
  - Total: 86.32 km^{2} (33.33 sq mi)

Population (2006)
  - Total: 2,668
  - Density: 30.91/km^{2} (80.05/sq mi)
- Postal code: 29-135
- Area code: +48 34
- Car plates: TLW
- Website: http://www.radkow.ugm.pl/

Gmina Radków is a rural gmina (administrative district) in Włoszczowa County, Świętokrzyskie Voivodeship, in south-central Poland. Its seat is the village of Radków, which lies approximately 16 kilometres (10 mi) south of Włoszczowa and 49 km (30 mi) south-west of the regional capital Kielce.

The gmina covers an area of 86.32 square kilometres (33.3 sq mi), and as of 2006 its total population is 2,668.

== Villages ==
Gmina Radków contains the villages and settlements of Bałków, Bieganów, Brzeście, Chycza, Dzierzgów, Kossów, Krasów, Kwilina, Nowiny-Dębnik, Ojsławice, Radków, Skociszewy, Sulików and Świerków.

== Neighbouring gminas ==
Gmina Radków is bordered by the gminas of Moskorzew, Nagłowice, Oksa, Secemin, Szczekociny and Włoszczowa.
