= Mojżeszów =

Village in Poland

- Village
- Location within Poland
- Coordinates: 51°0′28″N 20°0′0″E
- Country: Poland
- Voivodeship: Łódź
- County: Radomsko
- Gmina: Przedbórz

Mojżeszów [mɔi̯ˈʐɛʂuf] is a village in the administrative district of Gmina Przedbórz, within Radomsko County, Łódź Voivodeship, in central Poland.
