= Chałupki, Radomsko County =

Chałupki
- Village
- Location within Poland
- Coordinates: 51°3′25″N 19°52′58″E
- Country: Poland
- Voivodeship: Łódź
- County: Radomsko
- Gmina: Przedbórz

Chałupki [xaˈwupki] is a village in the administrative district of Gmina Przedbórz, within Radomsko County, Łódź Voivodeship, in central Poland.
