= Brzostek, Łódź Voivodeship =

Brzostek
- Village
- Location within Poland
- Coordinates: 51°3′8″N 19°54′27″E
- Country: Poland
- Voivodeship: Łódź
- County: Radomsko
- Gmina: Przedbórz

Brzostek [ˈbʐɔstɛk] is a village in the administrative district of Gmina Przedbórz, within Radomsko County, Łódź Voivodeship, in central Poland.
