= Żeleźnica, Łódź Voivodeship =

Żeleźnica
- Village
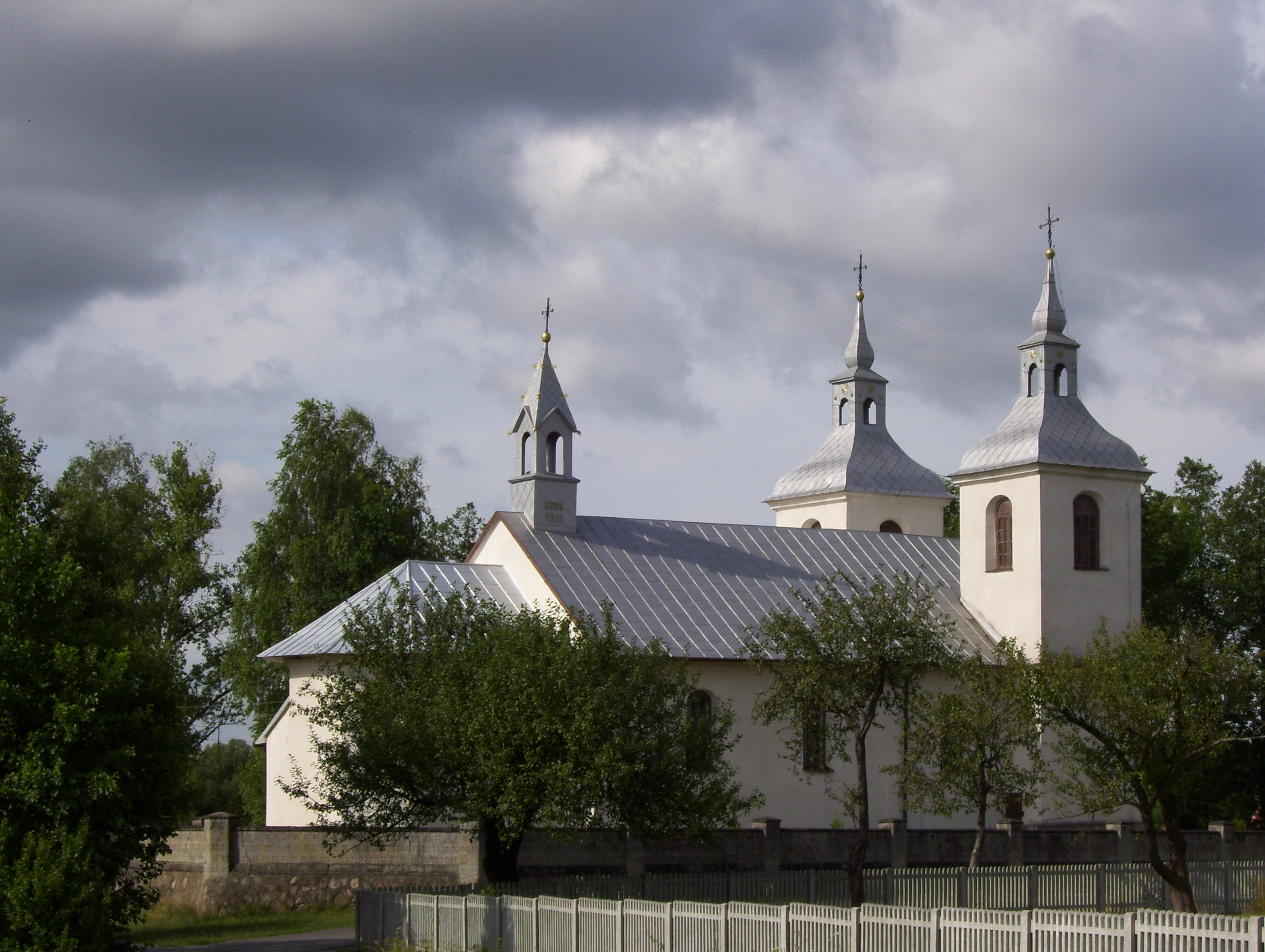
- Church of Saint Nicholas

- Location within Poland
- Coordinates: 50°59′10″N 20°0′33″E
- Country: Poland
- Voivodeship: Łódź
- County: Radomsko
- Gmina: Przedbórz

Żeleźnica [ʐɛlɛʑˈnit͡sa] is a village in the administrative district of Gmina Przedbórz, within Radomsko County, Łódź Voivodeship, in central Poland.
