= Zagacie, Łódź Voivodeship =

Zagacie
- Village
- Location within Poland
- Coordinates: 51°0′53″N 20°2′6″E
- Country: Poland
- Voivodeship: Łódź
- County: Radomsko
- Gmina: Przedbórz

Zagacie [zaˈɡat͡ɕɛ] is a village in the administrative district of Gmina Przedbórz, within Radomsko County, Łódź Voivodeship, in central Poland.
