= Radków, Świętokrzyskie Voivodeship =

Radków
- Village
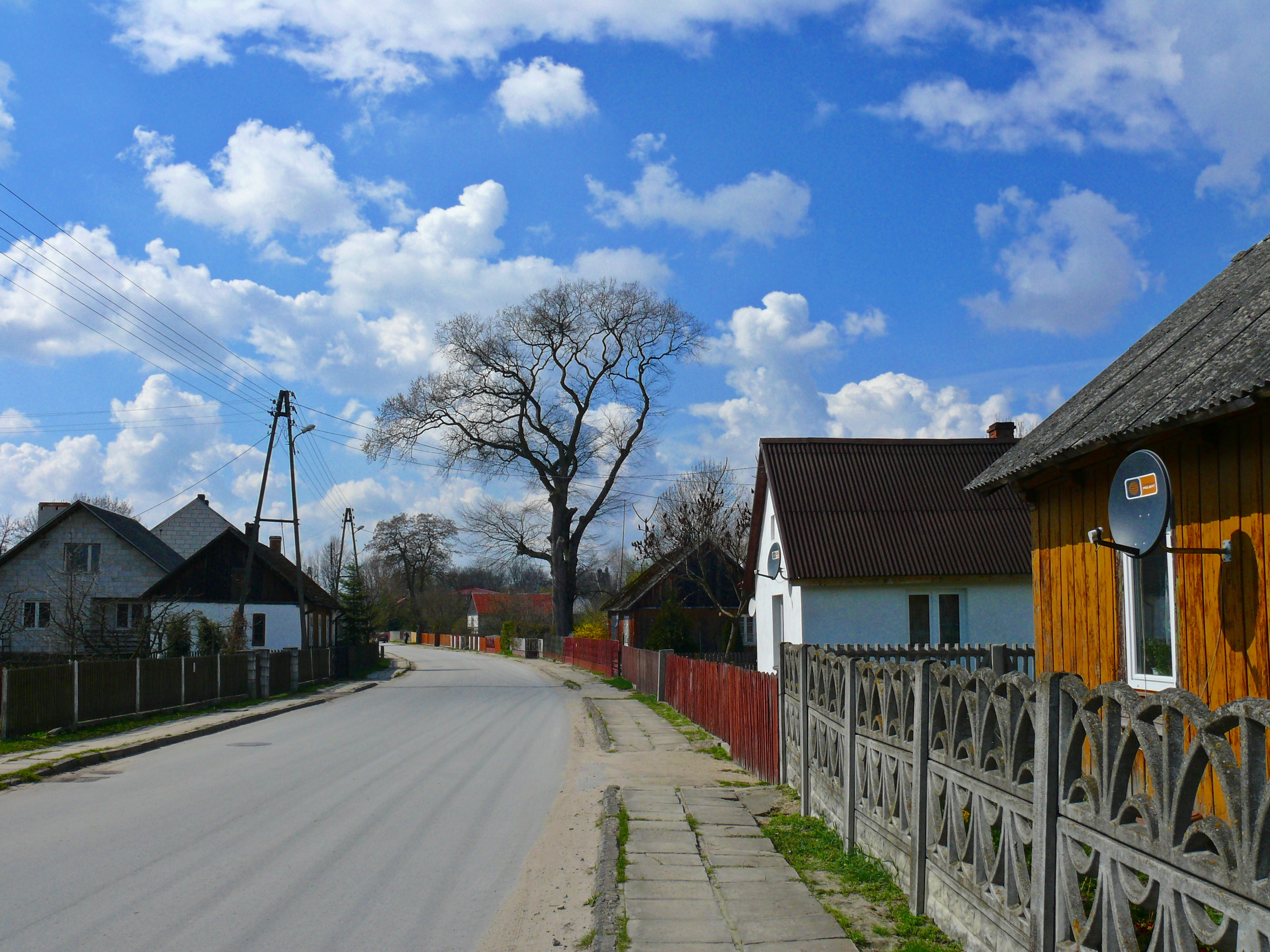

- Coat of arms

- Location within Poland
- Coordinates: 50°42′48″N 19°59′7″E
- Country: Poland
- Voivodeship: Świętokrzyskie
- County: Włoszczowa
- Gmina: Radków
- Population: 600
- Postal code: 29-135
- Area code: +48 34
- Car plates: TLW

Radków [ˈratkuf] is a village in Włoszczowa County, Świętokrzyskie Voivodeship, in south-central Poland. It is the seat of the gmina (administrative district) called Gmina Radków. It lies approximately 16 km (10 mi) south of Włoszczowa and 49 km (30 mi) south-west of the regional capital Kielce.
