= Krasocin =

- Village
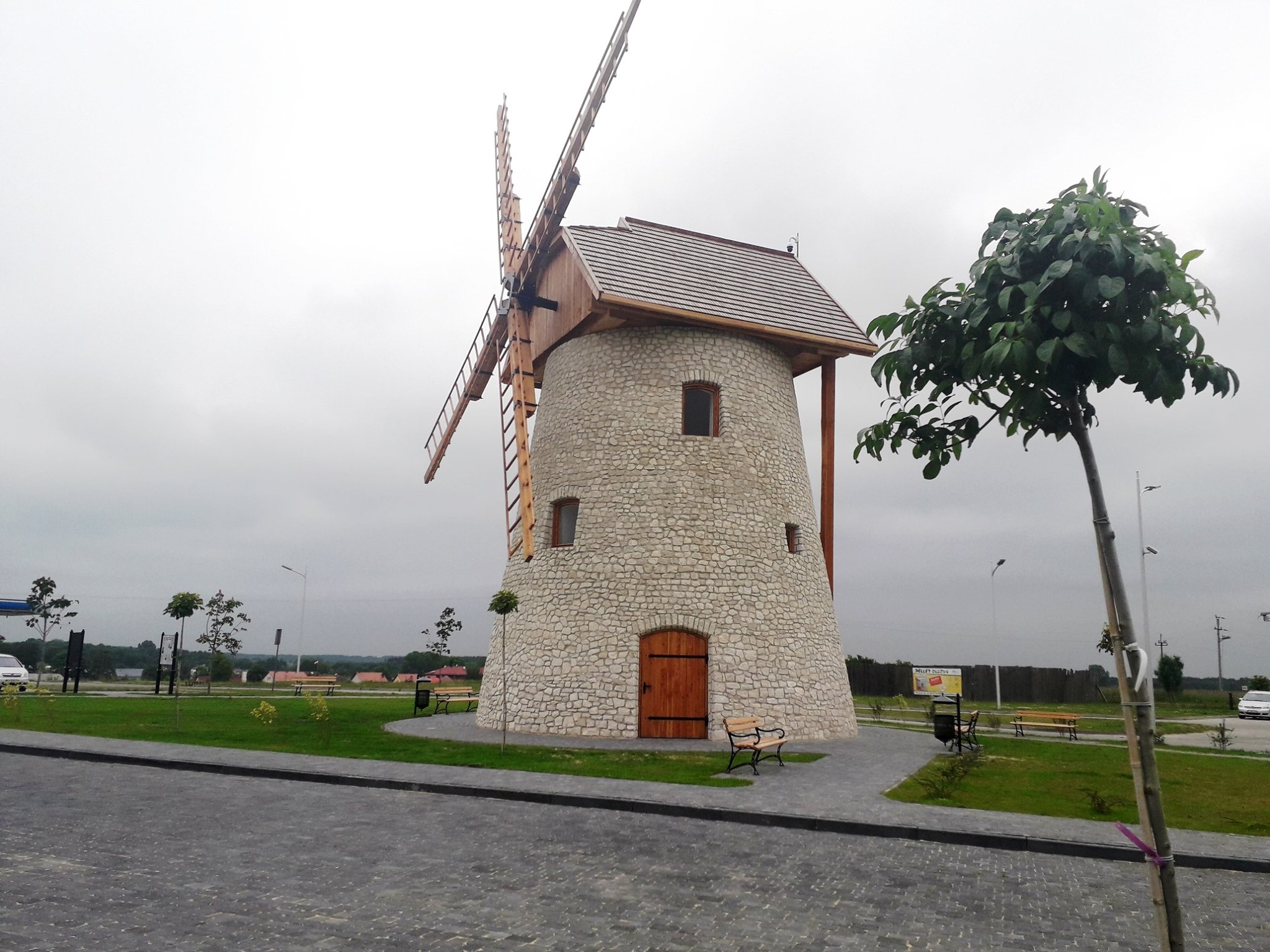
- Dutch mill in Krasocin

- Coat of arms

- Location within Poland
- Coordinates: 50°53′21″N 20°7′3″E
- Country: Poland
- Voivodeship: Świętokrzyskie
- County: Włoszczowa
- Gmina: Krasocin

Population
  - Total: 1,123
- Postal code: 29-105
- Area code: +48 41
- Car plates: TLW

Krasocin [kraˈsɔt͡ɕin] is a village in Włoszczowa County, Świętokrzyskie Voivodeship, in south-central Poland. It is the seat of the gmina (administrative district) called Gmina Krasocin. It lies approximately 12 km (7 mi) east of Włoszczowa and 36 km (22 mi) west of the regional capital Kielce.
