= Włoszczowa =

Town in Świętokrzyskie Voivodeship, Poland

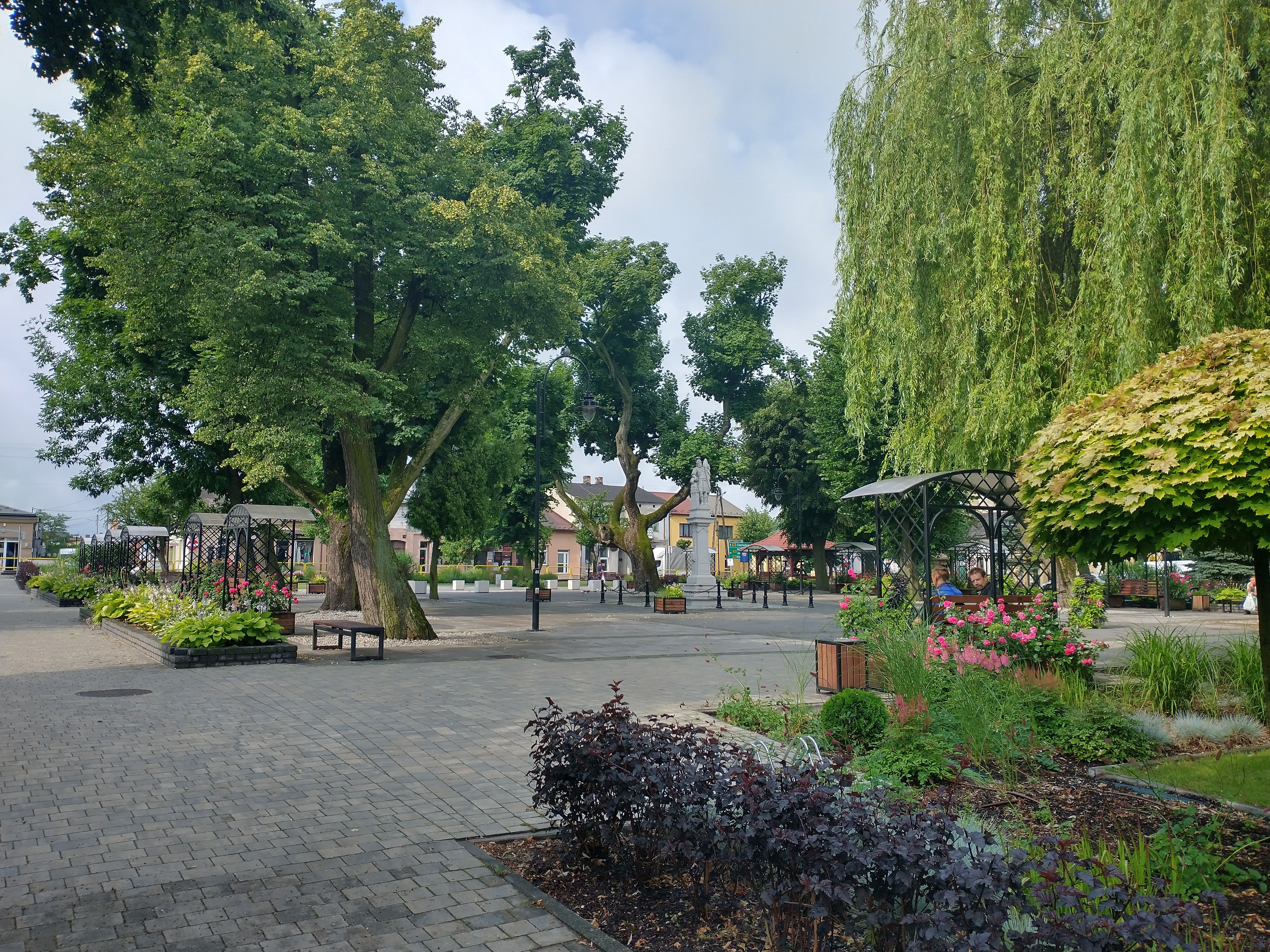
- Market Square in Włoszczowa

- Coat of arms

- Location within Poland
- Coordinates: 50°51′15″N 19°58′1″E
- Country: Poland
- Voivodeship: Świętokrzyskie
- County: Włoszczowa
- Gmina: Włoszczowa
- Town rights: 1539

Government
  - Mayor: Grzegorz Dziubek (PSL)

Area
  - Total: 30.17 km^{2} (11.65 sq mi)
- Elevation: 240 m (790 ft)

Population (2012)
  - Total: 10,657
  - Density: 353.2/km^{2} (914.9/sq mi)
- Time zone: UTC+1 (CET)
  - Summer (DST): UTC+2 (CEST)
- Postal code: 29-100
- Area code: +48 41
- Car plates: TLW
- Website: http://wloszczowa.pl/

Włoszczowa [vwɔˈʂt͡ʂɔva] is a town in southern Poland, in Świętokrzyskie Voivodeship. It lies approximately 50 kilometres (31 miles) west of Kielce. It is the capital of Włoszczowa County. Population is 10,657 (2010). Włoszczowa lies in historic Lesser Poland. The town has the area of 30 km^{2} (12 sq mi) (11 sq miles).

== History ==
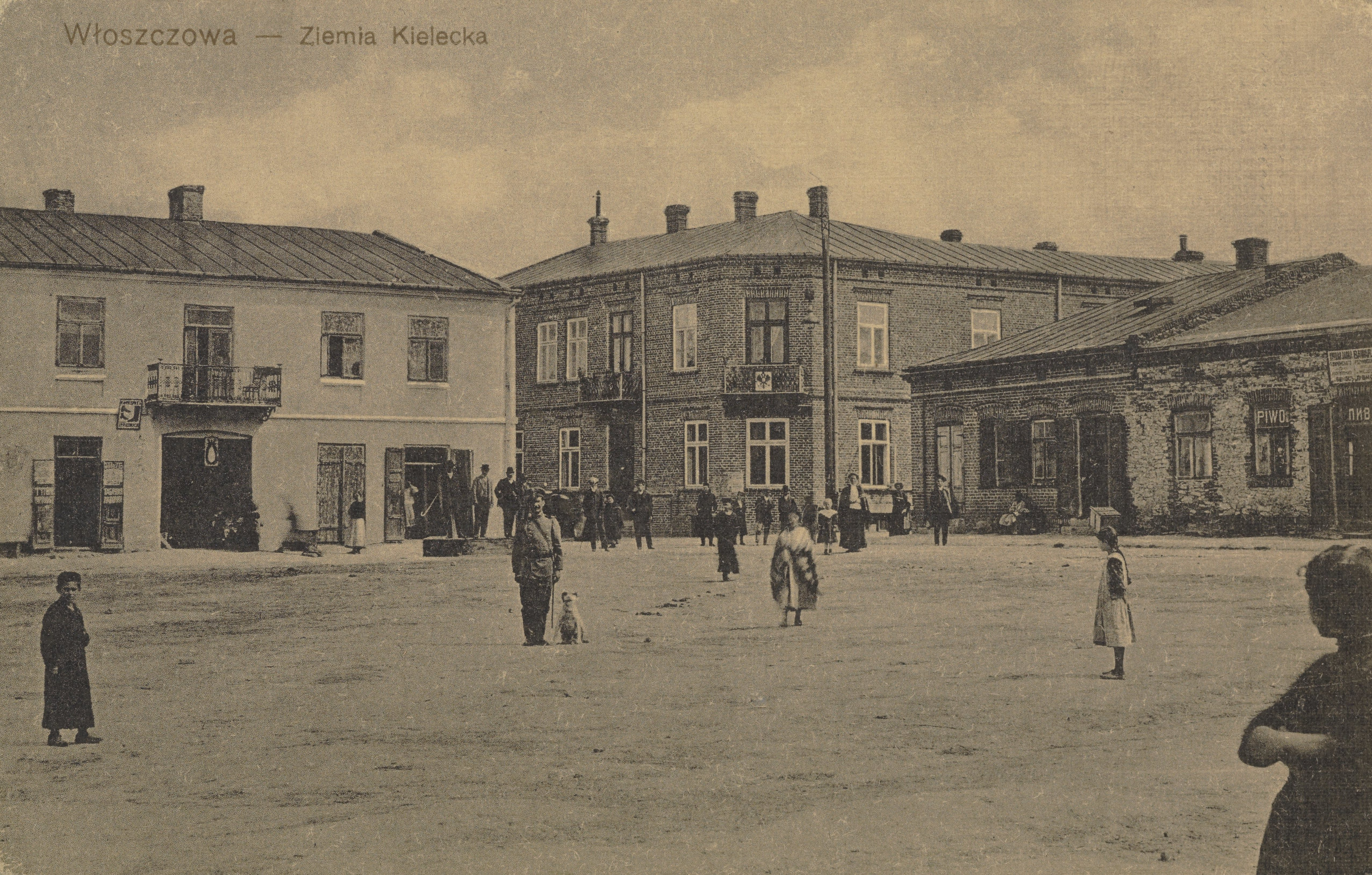
Włoszczowa in the early 20th century

Włoszczowa was first mentioned in 1154, when Prince Henry of Sandomierz handed the village known then as Vloszcova to the Sovereign Military Order of Malta monks. It received its town charter in 1539, when King Zygmunt Stary handed the document to the starosta of Chęciny, Hieronim Szafraniec. The town remained the property of the Szafraniec family until the late 18th century. In the Kingdom of Poland and the Polish–Lithuanian Commonwealth, Włoszczowa was part of the Sandomierz Voivodeship in the Lesser Poland Province.

After the Partitions of Poland, it belonged to Russian-controlled Congress Poland (1815-1918). In the Second Polish Republic, Włoszczowa belonged to Kielce Voivodeship. It had a large Jewish population, which made 50% of its population in 1925.

Following the German-Soviet invasion of Poland, which started World War II in September 1939, the village was occupied by Germany until 1945. Almost all Włoszczowa's Jews were murdered by the Germans in the Holocaust. On 19 March 1944, the town was briefly liberated by the Home Army.

== Sights ==
Among points of interest there are remains of a 12th-century gord, with traces of a moat, and ruins of the Szafraniec family castle (16th century). Furthermore, there is a 17th-century parish church, and the 16th-century urban layout of the streets.

== Demographics ==
Historical population
Year	Pop.	±%
1921	5,479	—
1931	6,900	+25.9%
1950	5,260	−23.8%
1960	6,057	+15.2%
2010	10,657	+75.9%

== Transport ==
Włoszczowa is a junction of regional roads nr 786, nr 742, and 785. Włoszczowa has two rail stations: PKP Włoszczowa (on the Kielce - Częstochowa route), and PKP Włoszczowa Północ (Włoszczowa North) (on the Central Rail Line).

== Twin towns ==
Włoszczowa is twinned with:

- Illintsi, Ukraine
- Le Passage, Lot-et-Garonne, France

== Gallery ==
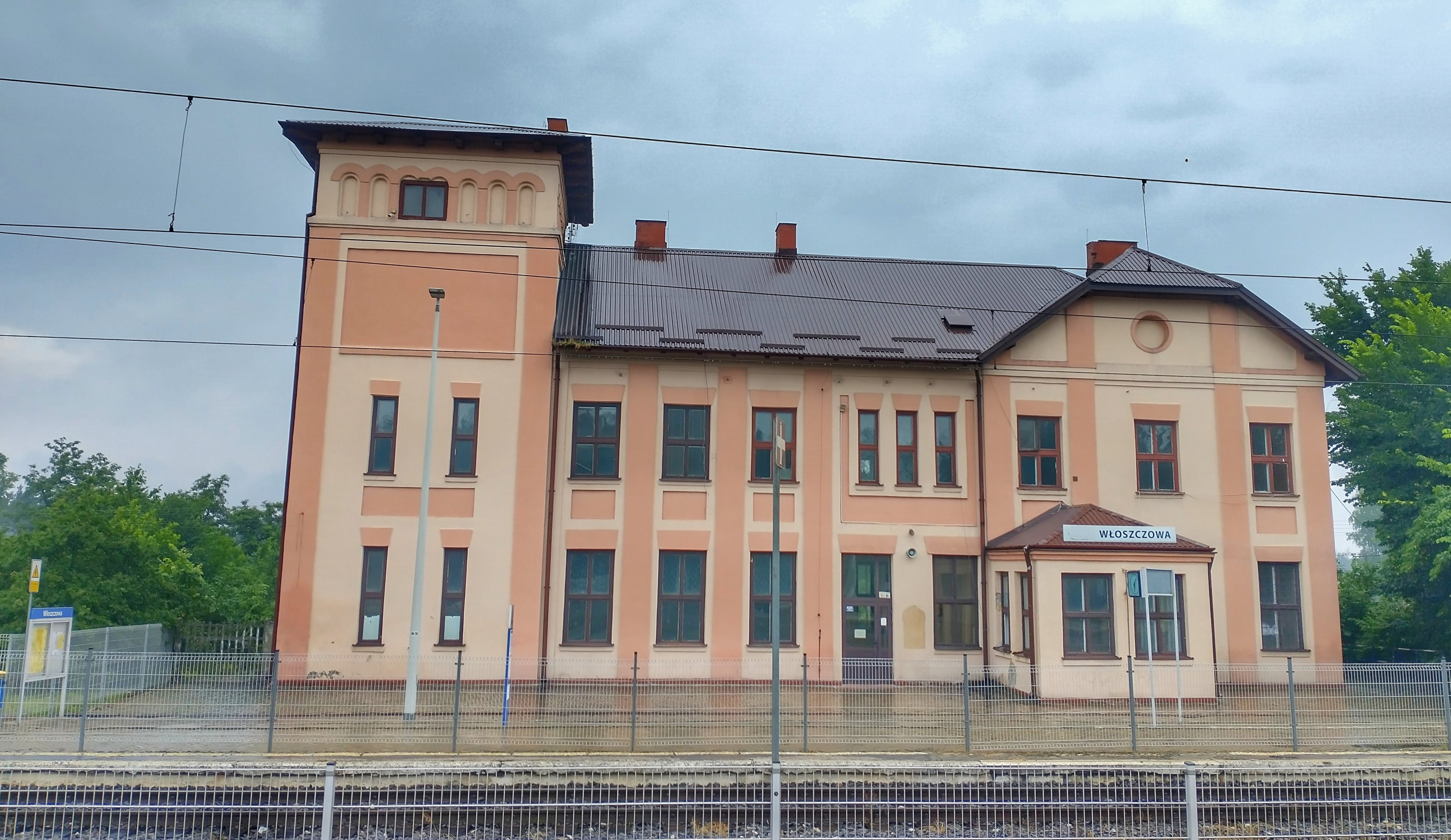
Train station

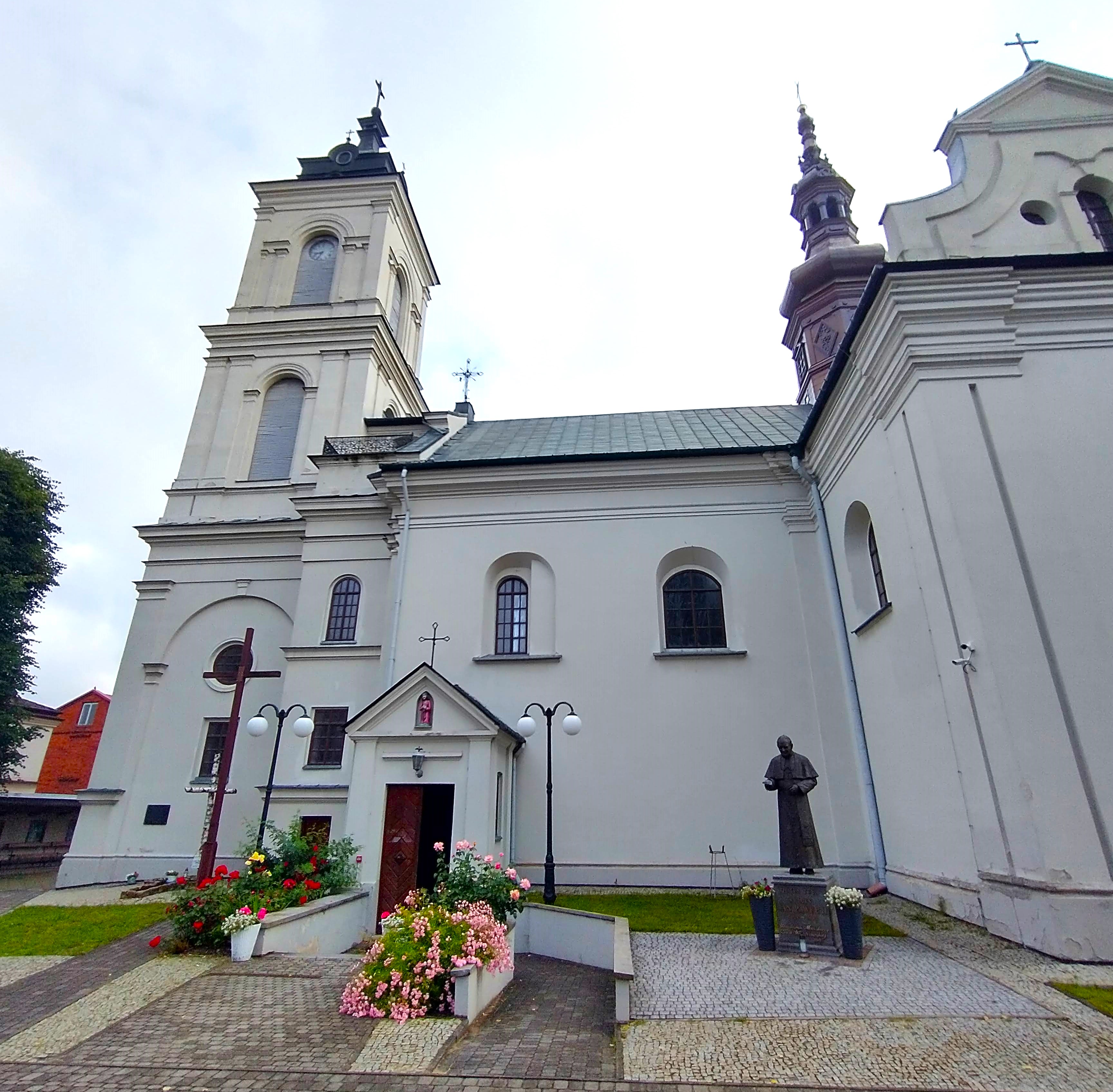
Church of the Assumption

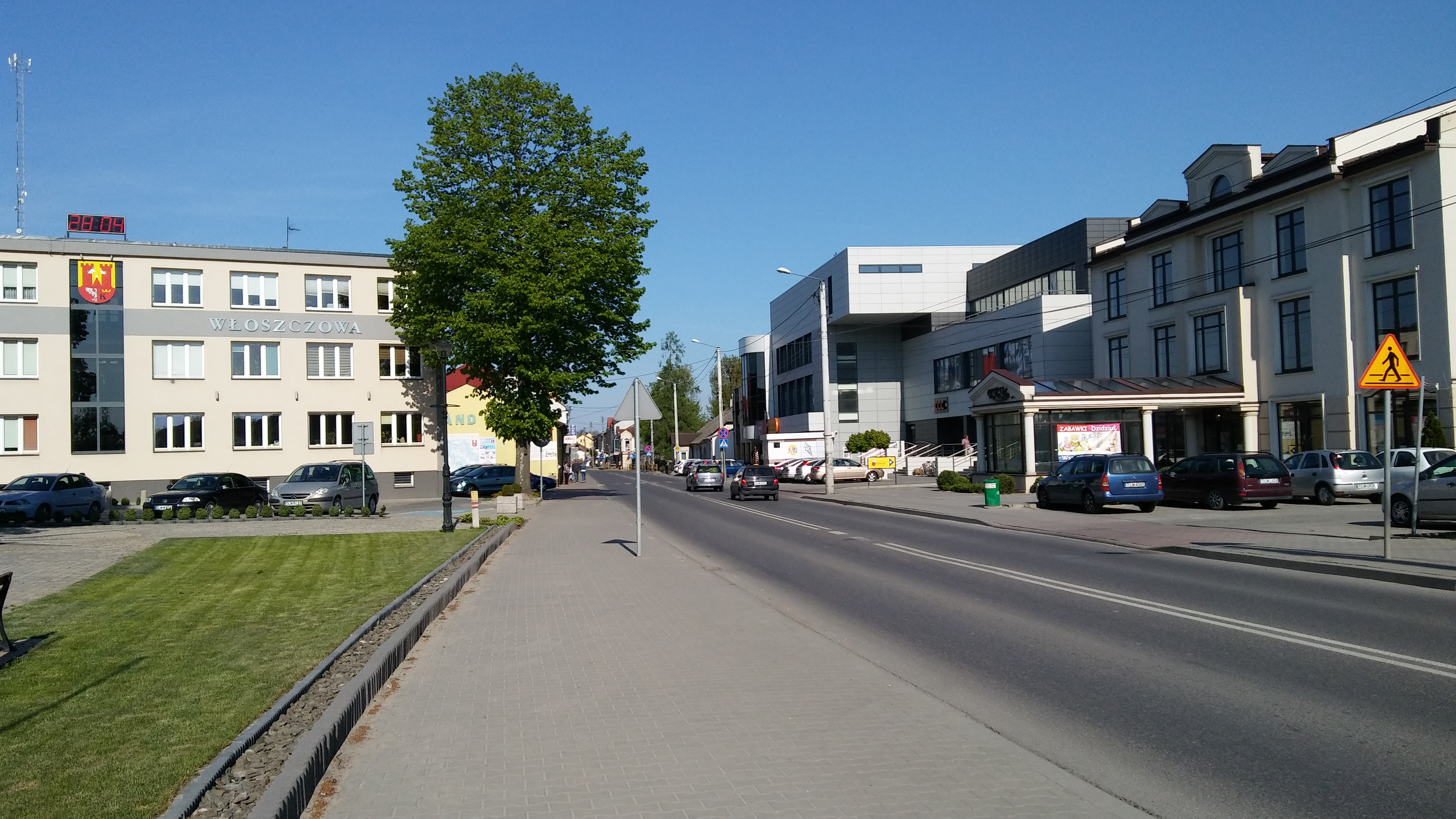
Partyzantów Street

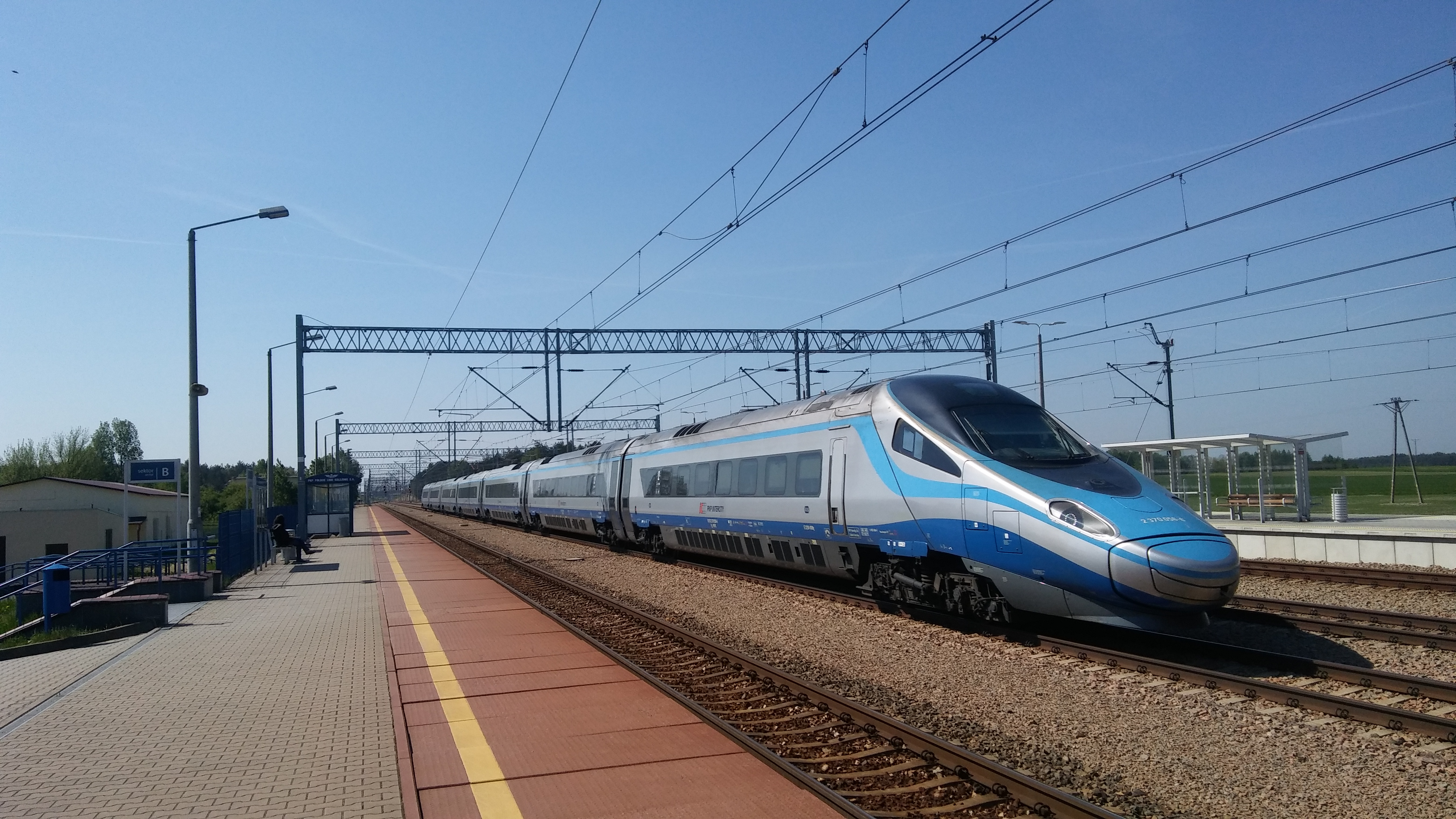
Pendolino at the Włoszczowa - North train station
