= Włoszczowa County =

Włoszczowa County Powiat włoszczowski
- County
- Flag Coat of arms

- Location within the voivodeship

- Division into gminas
- Coordinates (Włoszczowa): 50°51′15″N 19°58′1″E
- Country: Poland
- Voivodeship: Świętokrzyskie
- Seat: Włoszczowa
- Gminas: Total 6: Gmina Kluczewsko; Gmina Krasocin; Gmina Moskorzew; Gmina Radków; Gmina Secemin; Gmina Włoszczowa

Area
  - Total: 906.38 km^{2} (349.96 sq mi)

Population (2019)
  - Total: 45,137
  - Density: 49.799/km^{2} (128.98/sq mi)
  - Urban: 9,985
  - Rural: 35,152
- Postal code: 29-100 to 29-145
- Area codes: +48 34 and +48 41
- Car plates: TLW
- Website: www.powiat-wloszczowa.pl

Włoszczowa County (Polish: powiat włoszczowski) is a unit of territorial administration and local government (powiat) in Świętokrzyskie Voivodeship, south-central Poland. It came into being on January 1, 1999, as a result of the Polish local government reforms passed in 1998. Its administrative seat and only town is Włoszczowa, which lies 46 kilometres (29 mi) west of the regional capital Kielce.

The county covers an area of 906.38 square kilometres (350.0 sq mi). As of 2019 its total population is 45,137, out of which the population of Włoszczowa is 9,985, and the rural population is 35,152.

== Neighbouring counties ==
Włoszczowa County is bordered by Końskie County to the north-east, Kielce County to the east, Jędrzejów County to the south-east, Zawiercie County to the south-west, and Częstochowa County and Radomsko County to the west.

== Administrative divisions ==
The county is subdivided into six gminas (one urban-rural and five rural). These are listed in the following table, in descending order of population.

Gmina	Type	Area (km^{2})	Population (2019)	Seat
Gmina Włoszczowa	urban-rural	253.7	19,370	Włoszczowa
Gmina Krasocin	rural	193.9	10,608	Krasocin
Gmina Kluczewsko	rural	137.1	5,171	Kluczewsko
Gmina Secemin	rural	164.1	4,811	Secemin
Gmina Moskorzew	rural	71.3	2,677	Moskorzew
Gmina Radków	rural	86.3	2,500	Radków
