= Bobrowniki (disambiguation) =

Bobrowniki may refer to the following places:

- Bobrowniki in Kuyavian-Pomeranian Voivodeship (north-central Poland)
- Bobrowniki, Białystok County in Podlaskie Voivodeship (north-east Poland)
- Bobrowniki, Sokółka County in Podlaskie Voivodeship (north-east Poland)
- Bobrowniki, Łowicz County in Łódź Voivodeship (central Poland)
- Bobrowniki, Pajęczno County in Łódź Voivodeship (central Poland)
- Bobrowniki, Sieradz County in Łódź Voivodeship (central Poland)
- Bobrowniki, Lublin Voivodeship (east Poland)
- Bobrowniki, Świętokrzyskie Voivodeship (south-central Poland)
- Bobrowniki, Masovian Voivodeship (east-central Poland)
- Bobrowniki, Ostrzeszów County in Greater Poland Voivodeship (west-central Poland)
- Bobrowniki, Wągrowiec County in Greater Poland Voivodeship (west-central Poland)
- Bobrowniki, Silesian Voivodeship (south Poland)
- Bobrowniki, Lubusz Voivodeship (west Poland)
- Bobrowniki, Pomeranian Voivodeship (north Poland)
- Bobrowniki, West Pomeranian Voivodeship (north-west Poland)
