= Raczkiewicz =

Origin
- Language: Polish
- Meaning: from Raczki
- Region of origin: Poland

Other names
- Variant forms: Rackevičius (Lithuanianized), Rachkevich, Ratskevich, Rackiewicz, Similar surnames: Racewicz (Lithuanian: Racevičius); Raczewski ("from Racze", Lithuania); Rachkovsky, Raczkowski, Rackowski, Raczkowicz, Rackowicz, Racki (Ratzky), Ratsker (Rackier), etc.

Raczkiewicz is a Polish surname of Ruthenian origin. Notable people with the surname include:

- Tadeusz Raczkiewicz
- Władysław Raczkiewicz (1885–1947), Polish politician, lawyer, diplomat and first president of the Polish government-in-exile

== Rackevičius ==
- Vaclovas Rackevičius
