= Bobrowska =

Bobrowska may refer to the following villages in Poland:

- Kuźnica Bobrowska in Gmina Grabów, Ostrzeszów County
- Ignacówka Bobrowska in Gmina Głowaczów, Kozienice County
- Bobrowska Wola in Gmina Kluczewsko, Włoszczowa County
- Kolonia Bobrowska Wola in Gmina Kluczewsko, Włoszczowa County
