= Brzeście =

Brzeście may refer to the following places in Poland:

- Brzeście, Lower Silesian Voivodeship (south-west Poland)
- Brzeście, Jędrzejów County in Świętokrzyskie Voivodeship (south-central Poland)
- Brzeście, Pińczów County in Świętokrzyskie Voivodeship (south-central Poland)
- Brzeście, Skarżysko County in Świętokrzyskie Voivodeship (south-central Poland)
- Brzeście, Gmina Kluczewsko in Świętokrzyskie Voivodeship (south-central Poland)
- Brzeście, Gmina Radków in Świętokrzyskie Voivodeship (south-central Poland)
- Brzeście, Masovian Voivodeship (east-central Poland)
- Brzeście, West Pomeranian Voivodeship (north-west Poland)
