= Zmarłe =

- Village
- Location within Poland
- Coordinates: 50°55′5″N 19°58′1″E
- Country: Poland
- Voivodeship: Świętokrzyskie
- County: Włoszczowa
- Gmina: Kluczewsko
- Population: 80

Zmarłe [ˈzmarwɛ] is a village in the administrative district of Gmina Kluczewsko, within Włoszczowa County, Świętokrzyskie Voivodeship, in south-central Poland. It lies approximately 4 km (2 mi) east of Kluczewsko, 8 km (5 mi) north of Włoszczowa, and 46 km (29 mi) west of the regional capital Kielce.
