= Pilczyca, Włoszczowa County =

Pilczyca
- Village
- Location within Poland
- Coordinates: 50°56′27″N 19°54′17″E
- Country: Poland
- Voivodeship: Świętokrzyskie
- County: Włoszczowa
- Gmina: Kluczewsko

Pilczyca [pilˈt͡ʂɨt͡sa] is a village in the administrative district of Gmina Kluczewsko, within Włoszczowa County, Świętokrzyskie Voivodeship, in south-central Poland. It lies approximately 2 km (1 mi) north-west of Kluczewsko, 11 km (7 mi) north-west of Włoszczowa, and 51 km (32 mi) west of the regional capital Kielce.
