= Kolonia Łapczyna Wola =

- Village
- Location within Poland
- Coordinates: 50°59′44″N 19°53′12″E
- Country: Poland
- Voivodeship: Świętokrzyskie
- County: Włoszczowa
- Gmina: Kluczewsko

Kolonia Łapczyna Wola [kɔˈlɔɲa wapˈt͡ʂɨna ˈvɔla] is a village in the administrative district of Gmina Kluczewsko, within Włoszczowa County, Świętokrzyskie Voivodeship, in south-central Poland. It lies approximately 8 km (5 mi) north of Kluczewsko, 17 km (11 mi) north of Włoszczowa, and 53 km (33 mi) west of the regional capital Kielce.
