= Miedziana Góra, Włoszczowa County =

Miedziana Góra
- Village
- Location within Poland
- Coordinates: 50°57′49″N 19°53′29″E
- Country: Poland
- Voivodeship: Świętokrzyskie
- County: Włoszczowa
- Gmina: Kluczewsko

Miedziana Góra [mjɛˈd͡ʑana ˈɡura] is a village in the administrative district of Gmina Kluczewsko, within Włoszczowa County, Świętokrzyskie Voivodeship, in south-central Poland. It lies approximately 5 km (3 mi) north-west of Kluczewsko, 14 km (9 mi) north-west of Włoszczowa, and 52 km (32 mi) west of the regional capital Kielce.
