= Mrowina-Kolonia =

- Village
- Location within Poland
- Coordinates: 50°59′6″N 19°52′33″E
- Country: Poland
- Voivodeship: Świętokrzyskie
- County: Włoszczowa
- Gmina: Kluczewsko

Mrowina-Kolonia [mrɔˈvina kɔˈlɔɲa] is a village in the administrative district of Gmina Kluczewsko, within Włoszczowa County, Świętokrzyskie Voivodeship, in south-central Poland. It lies approximately 8 km (5 mi) north-west of Kluczewsko, 16 km (10 mi) north-west of Włoszczowa, and 54 km (34 mi) west of the regional capital Kielce.
