= Komorniki (disambiguation) =

Komorniki may refer to the following villages in Poland:

- Komorniki, the seat of Gmina Komorniki in Poznań County, Greater Poland Voivodeship (west-central Poland)
- Komorniki, Legnica County in Lower Silesian Voivodeship (south-west Poland)
- Komorniki, Polkowice County in Lower Silesian Voivodeship (south-west Poland)
- Komorniki, Gmina Środa Śląska in Lower Silesian Voivodeship (south-west Poland)
- Komorniki, Podlaskie Voivodeship (north-east Poland)
- Komorniki, Gmina Gorzkowice in Łódź Voivodeship (central Poland)
- Komorniki, Gmina Wolbórz in Łódź Voivodeship (central Poland)
- Komorniki, Wieluń County in Łódź Voivodeship (central Poland)
- Komorniki, Lesser Poland Voivodeship (south Poland)
- Komorniki, Świętokrzyskie Voivodeship (south-central Poland)
- Komorniki, Masovian Voivodeship (east-central Poland)
- Komorniki, Gmina Kleszczewo in Greater Poland Voivodeship (west-central Poland)
- Komorniki, Opole Voivodeship (south-west Poland)
- Komorniki, Strzelce County in Opole Voivodeship (south-west Poland)
- Komorniki, Warmian-Masurian Voivodeship (north Poland)
- Komorniki, West Pomeranian Voivodeship (north-west Poland)
