= Stanowiska, Włoszczowa County =

Stanowiska
- Village
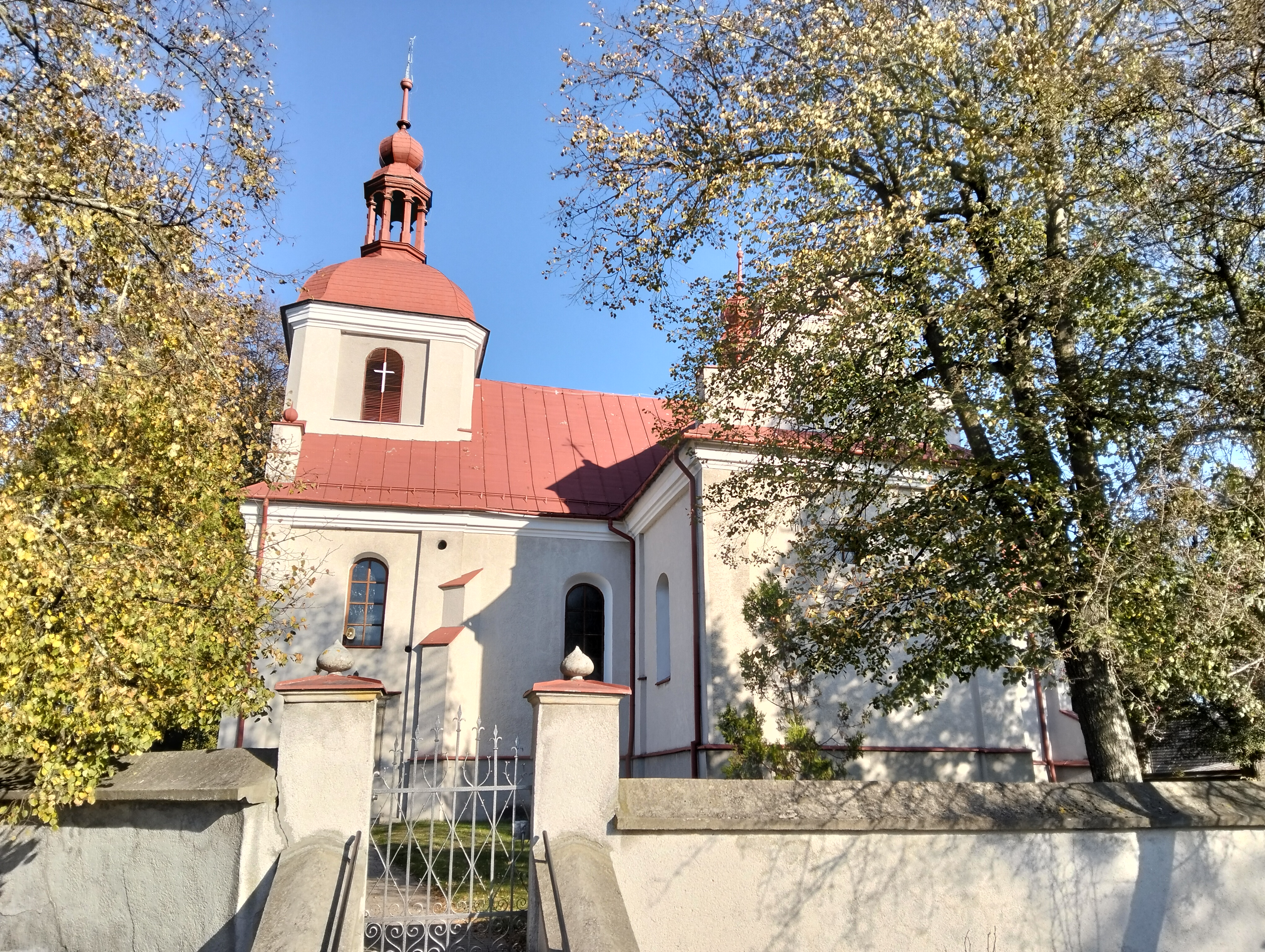
- Catholic church

- Location within Poland
- Coordinates: 50°58′33″N 19°55′17″E
- Country: Poland
- Voivodeship: Świętokrzyskie
- County: Włoszczowa
- Gmina: Kluczewsko

Stanowiska [stanɔˈviska] is a village in the administrative district of Gmina Kluczewsko, within Włoszczowa County, Świętokrzyskie Voivodeship, in south-central Poland. It lies approximately 6 km (4 mi) north of Kluczewsko, 14 km (9 mi) north of Włoszczowa, and 50 km (31 mi) west of the regional capital Kielce.
