= Boża Wola, Świętokrzyskie Voivodeship =

Boża Wola
- Village
- Location within Poland
- Coordinates: 50°59′54″N 19°56′58″E
- Country: Poland
- Voivodeship: Świętokrzyskie
- County: Włoszczowa
- Gmina: Kluczewsko

Boża Wola [ˈbɔʐa ˈvɔla] is a village in the administrative district of Gmina Kluczewsko, within Włoszczowa County, Świętokrzyskie Voivodeship, in south-central Poland. It lies approximately 9 km (6 mi) north of Kluczewsko, 17 km (11 mi) north of Włoszczowa, and 49 km (30 mi) west of the regional capital Kielce.
