= Januszewice, Świętokrzyskie Voivodeship =

Januszewice
- Village
- Location within Poland
- Coordinates: 50°56′36″N 19°57′56″E
- Country: Poland
- Voivodeship: Świętokrzyskie
- County: Włoszczowa
- Gmina: Kluczewsko

Januszewice [januʂɛˈvit͡sɛ] is a village in the administrative district of Gmina Kluczewsko, within Włoszczowa County, Świętokrzyskie Voivodeship, in south-central Poland. It lies approximately 4 km (2 mi) north-east of Kluczewsko, 10 km (6 mi) north of Włoszczowa, and 47 km (29 mi) west of the regional capital Kielce.
