= Jakubowice, Włoszczowa County =

Jakubowice
- Village
- Location within Poland
- Coordinates: 50°56′49″N 19°55′57″E
- Country: Poland
- Voivodeship: Świętokrzyskie
- County: Włoszczowa
- Gmina: Kluczewsko

Jakubowice [jakubɔˈvit͡sɛ] is a village in the administrative district of Gmina Kluczewsko, within Włoszczowa County, Świętokrzyskie Voivodeship, in south-central Poland. It lies approximately 3 km (2 mi) north of Kluczewsko, 11 km (7 mi) north of Włoszczowa, and 49 km (30 mi) west of the regional capital Kielce.
