= Pilczyca-Kolonia =

- Village
- Location within Poland
- Coordinates: 50°57′16″N 19°54′54″E
- Country: Poland
- Voivodeship: Świętokrzyskie
- County: Włoszczowa
- Gmina: Kluczewsko

Pilczyca-Kolonia [pilˈt͡ʂɨt͡sa kɔˈlɔɲa] is a village in the administrative district of Gmina Kluczewsko, within Włoszczowa County, Świętokrzyskie Voivodeship, in south-central Poland. It lies approximately 4 km (2 mi) north of Kluczewsko, 12 km (7 mi) north of Włoszczowa, and 50 km (31 mi) west of the regional capital Kielce.
