= Ciemiętniki =

- Village
- Location within Poland
- Coordinates: 50°56′55″N 19°51′37″E
- Country: Poland
- Voivodeship: Świętokrzyskie
- County: Włoszczowa
- Gmina: Kluczewsko

Ciemiętniki [t͡ɕɛmjɛntˈniki] is a village in the administrative district of Gmina Kluczewsko, within Włoszczowa County, Świętokrzyskie Voivodeship, in south-central Poland. It lies approximately 5 km (3 mi) north-west of Kluczewsko, 13 km (8 mi) north-west of Włoszczowa, and 54 km (34 mi) west of the regional capital Kielce.
