= Łapczyna Wola =

- Village
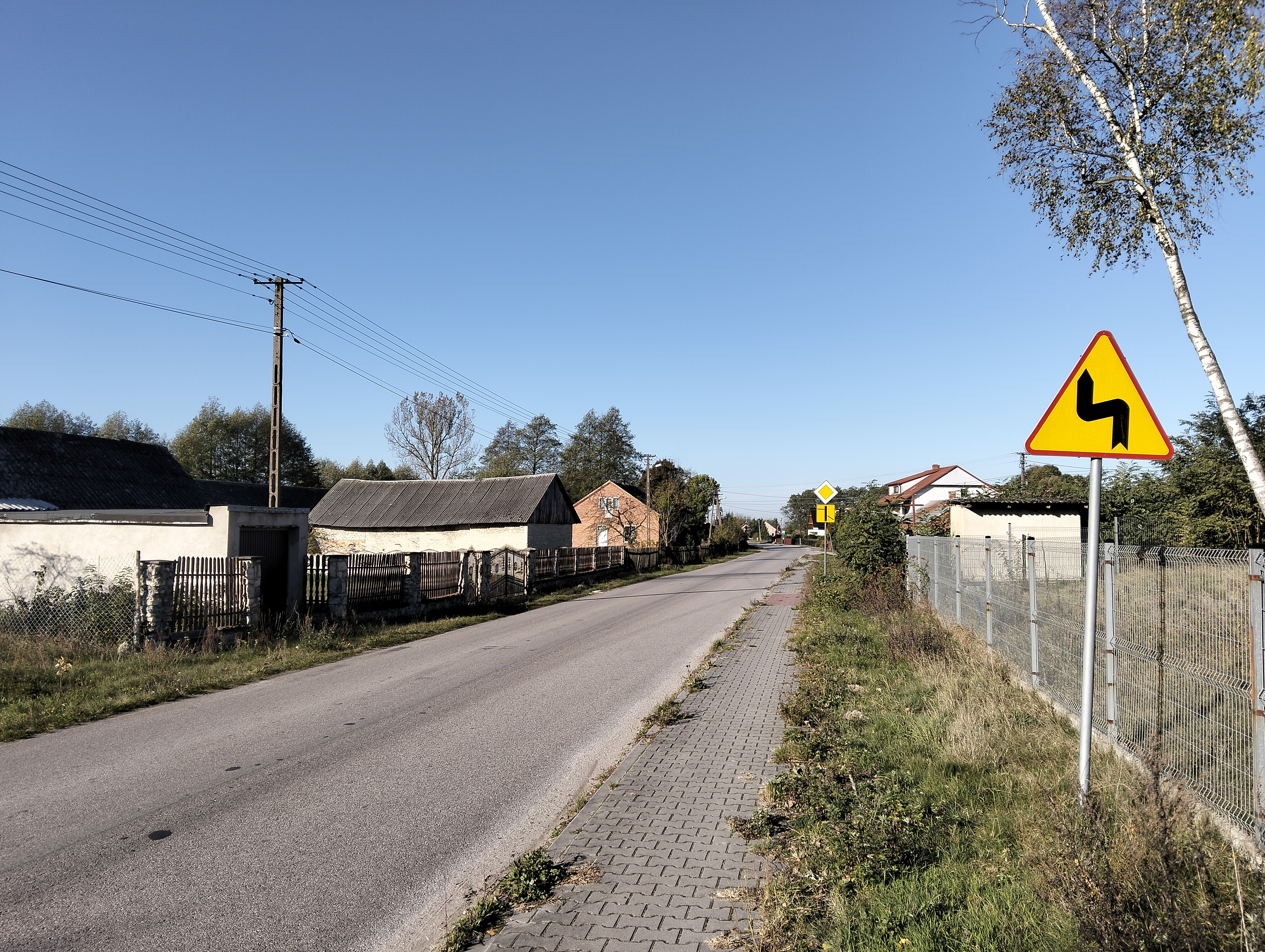

- Location within Poland
- Coordinates: 50°59′5″N 19°53′52″E
- Country: Poland
- Voivodeship: Świętokrzyskie
- County: Włoszczowa
- Gmina: Kluczewsko

Łapczyna Wola [wapˈt͡ʂɨna ˈvɔla] is a village in the administrative district of Gmina Kluczewsko, within Włoszczowa County, Świętokrzyskie Voivodeship, in south-central Poland. It lies approximately 7 km (4 mi) north of Kluczewsko, 16 km (10 mi) north of Włoszczowa, and 52 km (32 mi) west of the regional capital Kielce.

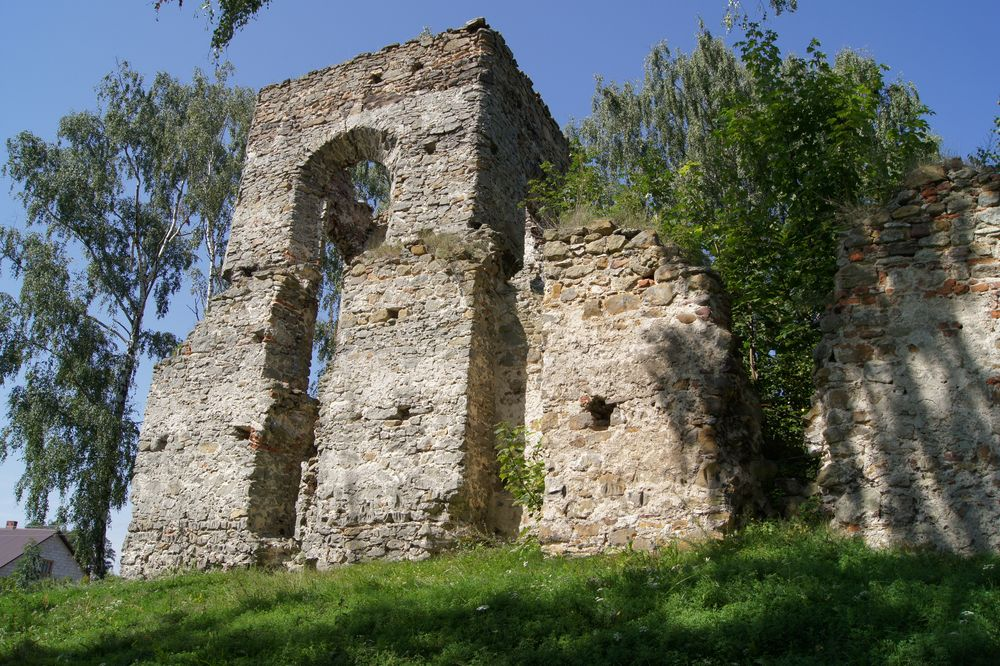
Ruins of the Calvinist church in Łapczyna Wola.

== Calvinist church ==
In 1704 existed in Łapczyna Wola, the Calvinist church. In 1730, the minister of the church was Samuel Aram. In 1754, the church was closed.
