= Jeżowiec, Świętokrzyskie Voivodeship =

Jeżowiec
- Village
- Location within Poland
- Coordinates: 50°59′54″N 19°54′30″E
- Country: Poland
- Voivodeship: Świętokrzyskie
- County: Włoszczowa
- Gmina: Kluczewsko

Jeżowiec [jɛˈʐɔvjɛt͡s] is a village in the administrative district of Gmina Kluczewsko, within Włoszczowa County, Świętokrzyskie Voivodeship, in south-central Poland. It lies approximately 8 km (5 mi) north of Kluczewsko, 17 km (11 mi) north of Włoszczowa, and 52 km (32 mi) west of the regional capital Kielce.
