= Kowale =

Kowale may refer to the following places in Poland:

- Kowale, Wrocław (south-west Poland)
- Kowale, Łódź Voivodeship (central Poland)
- Kowale, Lower Silesian Voivodeship (south-west Poland)
- Kowale, Masovian Voivodeship (east-central Poland)
- Kowale, Opole Voivodeship (south-west Poland)
- Kowale, Białystok County in Podlaskie Voivodeship (north-east Poland)
- Kowale, Bielsk County in Podlaskie Voivodeship (north-east Poland)
- Kowale, Sokółka County in Podlaskie Voivodeship (north-east Poland)
- Kowale, Gdańsk County in Pomeranian Voivodeship (north Poland)
- Kowale, Kartuzy County in Pomeranian Voivodeship (north Poland)
- Kowale, Kwidzyn County in Pomeranian Voivodeship (north Poland)
- Kowale, Cieszyn County in Silesian Voivodeship (south Poland)
- Kowale, Częstochowa County in Silesian Voivodeship (south Poland)
- Kowale, Warmian-Masurian Voivodeship (north Poland)
