= Kąparzów =

Komparzów
- Village
- Location within Poland
- Coordinates: 50°54′35″N 19°53′20″E
- Country: Poland
- Voivodeship: Świętokrzyskie
- County: Włoszczowa
- Gmina: Kluczewsko

Komparzów [kɔmˈpaʐuf] is a village in the administrative district of Gmina Kluczewsko, within Włoszczowa County, Świętokrzyskie Voivodeship, in south-central Poland. It lies approximately 3 km (2 mi) south-west of Kluczewsko, 9 km (6 mi) north-west of Włoszczowa, and 52 km (32 mi) west of the regional capital Kielce.
