= Dąbrowy, Świętokrzyskie Voivodeship =

Dąbrowy
- Village
- Location within Poland
- Coordinates: 50°55′N 19°52′E
- Country: Poland
- Voivodeship: Świętokrzyskie
- County: Włoszczowa
- Gmina: Kluczewsko

Dąbrowy [dɔmˈbrɔvɨ] is a village in the administrative district of Gmina Kluczewsko, within Włoszczowa County, Świętokrzyskie Voivodeship, in south-central Poland. It lies approximately 4 km (2 mi) west of Kluczewsko, 10 km (6 mi) north-west of Włoszczowa, and 53 km (33 mi) west of the regional capital Kielce.
