= Nowiny, Włoszczowa County =

Nowiny
- Village
- Location within Poland
- Coordinates: 50°57′16″N 19°59′1″E
- Country: Poland
- Voivodeship: Świętokrzyskie
- County: Włoszczowa
- Gmina: Kluczewsko

Nowiny [nɔˈvinɨ] is a village in the administrative district of Gmina Kluczewsko, within Włoszczowa County, Świętokrzyskie Voivodeship, in south-central Poland. It lies approximately 6 km (4 mi) north-east of Kluczewsko, 12 km (7 mi) north of Włoszczowa, and 46 km (29 mi) west of the regional capital Kielce.
