= Dąbrowa Wielka =

Dąbrowa Wielka may refer to the following places:

- Dąbrowa Wielka, Kuyavian-Pomeranian Voivodeship (north-central Poland)
- Dąbrowa Wielka, Łódź Voivodeship (central Poland)
- Dąbrowa Wielka, Podlaskie Voivodeship (north-east Poland)
