= Zabrodzie, Świętokrzyskie Voivodeship =

Zabrodzie
- Village
- Location within Poland
- Coordinates: 50°54′45″N 19°59′8″E
- Country: Poland
- Voivodeship: Świętokrzyskie
- County: Włoszczowa
- Gmina: Kluczewsko

Zabrodzie [zaˈbrɔd͡ʑɛ] is a village in the administrative district of Gmina Kluczewsko, within Włoszczowa County, Świętokrzyskie Voivodeship, in south-central Poland. It lies approximately 5 km (3 mi) east of Kluczewsko, 7 km (4 mi) north of Włoszczowa, and 45 km (28 mi) west of the regional capital Kielce.
