= Dobromierz, Świętokrzyskie Voivodeship =

Dobromierz
- Village
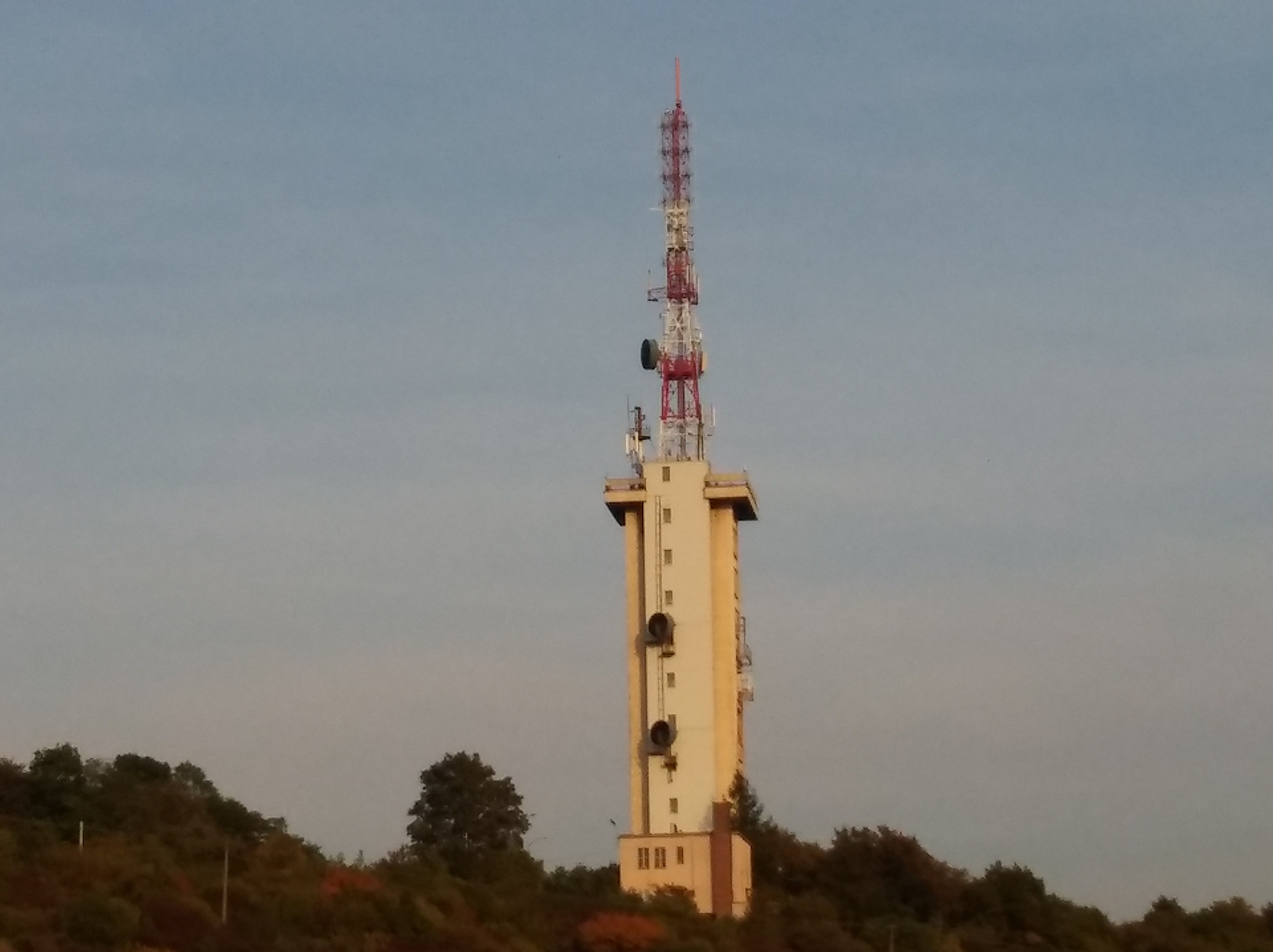

- Location within Poland
- Coordinates: 51°0′24″N 19°53′42″E
- Country: Poland
- Voivodeship: Świętokrzyskie
- County: Włoszczowa
- Gmina: Kluczewsko

Dobromierz [dɔˈbrɔmjɛʂ] is a village in the administrative district of Gmina Kluczewsko, within Włoszczowa County, Świętokrzyskie Voivodeship, in south-central Poland. It lies approximately 10 km (6 mi) north of Kluczewsko, 18 km (11 mi) north of Włoszczowa, and 53 km (33 mi) west of the regional capital Kielce.
