= Mrowina =

- Village
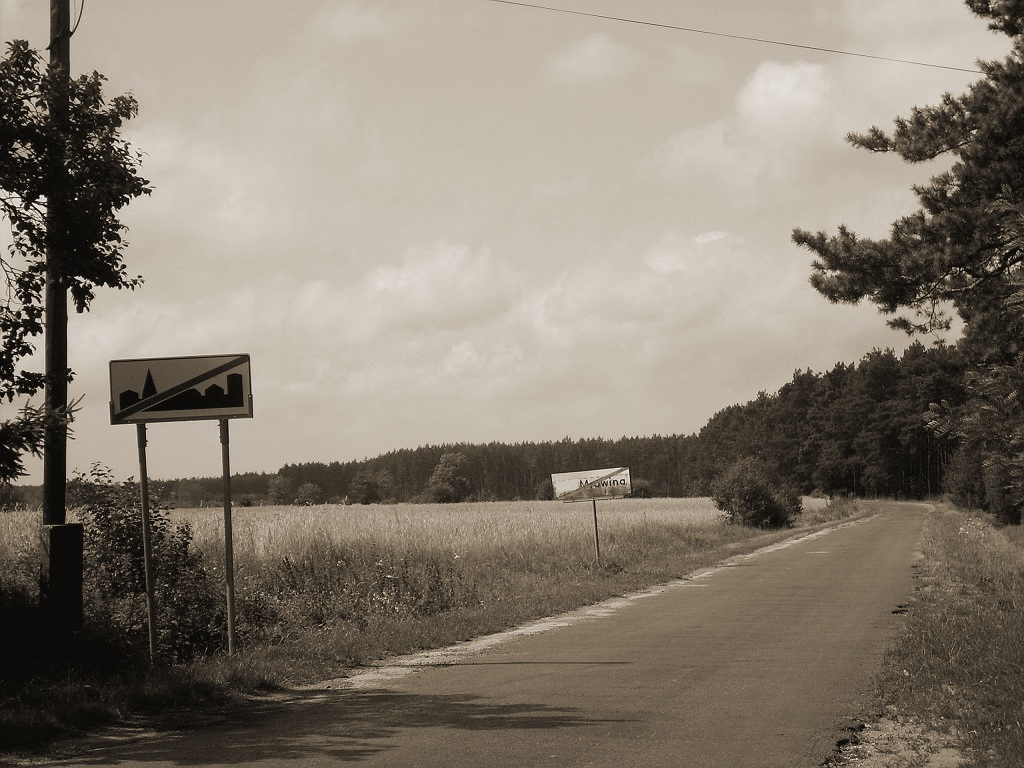

- Location within Poland
- Coordinates: 50°59′50″N 19°52′24″E
- Country: Poland
- Voivodeship: Świętokrzyskie
- County: Włoszczowa
- Gmina: Kluczewsko
- Website: http://www.mrowina.republika.pl

Mrowina [mrɔˈvina] is a village in the administrative district of Gmina Kluczewsko, within Włoszczowa County, Świętokrzyskie Voivodeship, in south-central Poland. It lies approximately 9 km (6 mi) north-west of Kluczewsko, 18 km (11 mi) north-west of Włoszczowa, and 54 km (34 mi) west of the regional capital Kielce.
