= Zalesie, Włoszczowa County =

Zalesie
- Village
- Location within Poland
- Coordinates: 50°59′5″N 19°57′55″E
- Country: Poland
- Voivodeship: Świętokrzyskie
- County: Włoszczowa
- Gmina: Kluczewsko

Zalesie [zaˈlɛɕɛ] is a village in the administrative district of Gmina Kluczewsko, within Włoszczowa County, Świętokrzyskie Voivodeship, in south-central Poland. It lies approximately 8 km (5 mi) north-east of Kluczewsko, 15 km (9 mi) north of Włoszczowa, and 48 km (30 mi) west of the regional capital Kielce.
