= List of European tornadoes in 2013 =

This is a list of all tornadoes that were confirmed throughout Europe by the European Severe Storms Laboratory and local meteorological agencies during 2013. Unlike the United States, the original Fujita Scale and the TORRO scale are used to rank tornadoes across the continent.

== European yearly total ==
Tornadoes by Country (as of December 22, 2013)
Country	Total	F?	F0	F1	F2	F3	F4	F5
Austria	1	1	0	0	0	0	0	0
Belarus	3	2	0	0	1	0	0	0
Belgium	6	2	2	2	0	0	0	0
Bulgaria	1	1	0	0	0	0	0	0
Croatia	35	34	0	1	0	0	0	0
Czech Republic	2	1	0	0	1	0	0	0
Denmark	10	8	2	0	0	0	0	0
Estonia	1	0	0	1	0	0	0	0
France	43	23	5	12	2	1	0	0
Germany	26	21	0	3	2	0	0	0
Greece	49	45	1	3	0	0	0	0
Hungary	5	5	0	0	0	0	0	0
Ireland	2	2	0	0	0	0	0	0
Italy	85	76	3	4	2	0	0	0
Kazakhstan	3	3	0	0	0	0	0	0
Latvia	1	1	0	0	0	0	0	0
Lithuania	1	0	0	1	0	0	0	0
Malta	2	2	0	0	0	0	0	0
Netherlands	12	12	0	0	0	0	0	0
Norway	8	7	0	1	0	0	0	0
Poland	10	8	0	2	0	0	0	0
Portugal	2	2	0	0	0	0	0	0
Romania	4	3	0	0	1	0	0	0
Russia	66	58	1	6	1	0	0	0
Serbia	2	1	0	1	0	0	0	0
Slovakia	1	1	0	0	0	0	0	0
Slovenia	4	4	0	0	0	0	0	0
Spain	13	11	1	1	0	0	0	0
Sweden	7	7	0	0	0	0	0	0
Switzerland	7	6	0	1	0	0	0	0
Turkey	31	20	1	9	1	0	0	0
Ukraine	17	16	0	1	0	0	0	0
United Kingdom	6	4	1	1	0	0	0	0
Totals	466	390	17	48	10	1	0	0

== January ==
=== January 2 event ===
List of reported tornadoes - Wednesday, January 2, 2013
F#	T#	Location	District/ County	Coord.	Time (UTC)	Path length	Comments/Damage
Italy
F?	T?	San Lucido	Cosenza	39.31°N 16.04°E	1300	Unknown	Waterspout briefly moved onshore near San Lucido
Sources: ESSL Severe Weather Database

=== January 16 event ===
List of reported tornadoes - Wednesday, January 16, 2013
F#	T#	Location	District/ County	Coord.	Time (UTC)	Path length	Comments/Damage
Turkey
F1	T?	Turgutlu	Manisa	38.50°N 27.71°E	2200	Unknown	The roof of a poultry barn was blown off and trees were uprooted
Sources: ESSL Severe Weather Database

=== January 17 event ===
List of reported tornadoes - Thursday, January 17, 2013
F#	T#	Location	District/ County	Coord.	Time (UTC)	Path length	Comments/Damage
Turkey
F?	T?	Serik	Antalya	36.92°N 31.10°E	0100	Unknown	
Sources: ESSL Severe Weather Database

=== January 24 event ===
List of reported tornadoes - Thursday, January 24, 2013
F#	T#	Location	District/ County	Coord.	Time (UTC)	Path length	Comments/Damage
Greece
F1	T?	Xánthi	East Macedonia and Thrace	41.14°N 24.88°E	1100	Unknown	Tornado struck Xánthi and destroyed one home. One person was injured by the storm.
Sources: ESSL Severe Weather Database

=== January 27 event ===
List of reported tornadoes - Sunday, January 27, 2013
F#	T#	Location	District/ County	Coord.	Time (UTC)	Path length	Comments/Damage
United Kingdom
F?	T?	Clevedon	Somerset	51.47°N 2.87°W	1300	Unknown	Confirmed tornado
Sources: ESSL Severe Weather Database

== February ==
=== February 2 event ===
List of reported tornadoes - Saturday, February 2, 2013
F#	T#	Location	District/ County	Coord.	Time (UTC)	Path length	Comments/Damage
Italy
F?	T?	Rome	Lazio	41.92°N 12.39°E	1400	Unknown	A tornado was reported near Rome
Sources: ESSL Severe Weather Database

=== February 5 event ===
List of reported tornadoes - Tuesday, February 5, 2013
F#	T#	Location	District/ County	Coord.	Time (UTC)	Path length	Comments/Damage
Belgium
F?	T?	Meulebeke	West Flanders	50.95°N 3.28°E	0405	0.7 km (0.43 mi)	At least one home was damaged
France
F0	T1	Étang-sur-Arroux	Saône-et-Loire	46.87°N 4.18°E	1300	3.5 km (2.2 mi)	Several structures sustained minor damage and many trees were snapped
Sources: ESSL Severe Weather Database

=== February 7 event ===
List of reported tornadoes - Thursday, February 7, 2013
F#	T#	Location	District/ County	Coord.	Time (UTC)	Path length	Comments/Damage
Greece
F?	T?	Missolonghi	West Greece	38.38°N 21.44°E	1200	Unknown	Homes were damaged
F1	T?	Tatoi Airport	Attica	37.98°N 23.73°E	1448	Unknown	Tornado with winds of 166 km/h (103 mph) struck Tatoi Airport, destroying two small planes and damaging several structures. Debris from the aircraft was blown upwards of 70 m (230 ft) away.
Sources: ESSL Severe Weather Database

=== February 8 event ===
List of reported tornadoes - Friday, February 8, 2013
F#	T#	Location	District/ County	Coord.	Time (UTC)	Path length	Comments/Damage
Italy
F?	T?	Porto Cervo	Olbia-Tempio	41.12°N 9.58°E	1200	Unknown	Waterspout briefly moved onshore and damaged trees.
Sources: ESSL Severe Weather Database

=== February 9 event ===
List of reported tornadoes - Saturday, February 9, 2013
F#	T#	Location	District/ County	Coord.	Time (UTC)	Path length	Comments/Damage
Turkey
F?	T?	Gebiz	Antalya	37.10°N 30.94°E	2030	Unknown	Tornado struck the town of Gebiz, destroying a barn and damaging several structures. Five sheep were killed.
Sources: ESSL Severe Weather Database

=== February 15 event ===
List of reported tornadoes - Friday, February 15, 2013
F#	T#	Location	District/ County	Coord.	Time (UTC)	Path length	Comments/Damage
Turkey
F1	T?	Bozyazı area (1st tornado)	Mersin	36.10°N 32.97°E	0045	Unknown	One of three tornadoes to strike near Bozyazı. Greenhouses were damaged and numerous trees were downed
F?	T?	Bozyazı area (2nd tornado)	Mersin	36.10°N 32.97°E	0045	Unknown	One of three tornadoes to strike near Bozyazı. Greenhouses were damaged and numerous trees were downed
F?	T?	Bozyazı area (3rd tornado)	Mersin	36.10°N 32.97°E	0045	Unknown	One of three tornadoes to strike near Bozyazı. Greenhouses were damaged and numerous trees were downed
Sources: ESSL Severe Weather Database

=== February 19 event ===
List of reported tornadoes - Tuesday, February 19, 2013
F#	T#	Location	District/ County	Coord.	Time (UTC)	Path length	Comments/Damage
Turkey
F?	T?	Alanya	Antalya	36.55°N 32.00°E	1430	Unknown	Waterspout moved onshore without causing damage
Sources: ESSL Severe Weather Database

=== February 27 event ===
List of reported tornadoes - Wednesday, February 27, 2013
F#	T#	Location	District/ County	Coord.	Time (UTC)	Path length	Comments/Damage
Turkey
F?	T?	Foça	İzmir	38.67°N 26.76°E	1100	Unknown	Tornado caused some crop damage
Sources: ESSL Severe Weather Database

== March ==
=== March 9 event ===
List of reported tornadoes - Saturday, March 9, 2013
F#	T#	Location	District/ County	Coord.	Time (UTC)	Path length	Comments/Damage
Spain
F0	T1	Moledo	Viana do Castelo	41.55°N 1.03°E	1130	Unknown	Confirmed tornado
F?	T?	A Guarda	Pontevedra	41.90°N 8.86°W	1230	Unknown	
Portugal
F?	T?	Porto	Porto	41.16°N 8.62°W	1730	Unknown	
F?	T?	A Ver-o-Mar	Porto	41.40°N 8.77°W	2230	Unknown	
Sources: ESSL Severe Weather Database

=== March 10 event ===
List of reported tornadoes - Sunday, March 10, 2013
F#	T#	Location	District/ County	Coord.	Time (UTC)	Path length	Comments/Damage
Hungary
F?	T?	Etyek	Fejér	47.45°N 18.75°E	1530	Unknown	Possible tornado
Sources: ESSL Severe Weather Database

=== March 12 event ===
List of reported tornadoes - Tuesday, March 12, 2013
F#	T#	Location	District/ County	Coord.	Time (UTC)	Path length	Comments/Damage
Turkey
F2	T5	Seben	Bolu	47.45°N 18.75°E	0000	Unknown	Seven well-constructed frame homes were destroyed and ten others lost their roof.
Sources: ESSL Severe Weather Database

=== March 31 event ===
List of reported tornadoes - Sunday, March 31, 2013
F#	T#	Location	District/ County	Coord.	Time (UTC)	Path length	Comments/Damage
Serbia
F1	T?	Torda	Central Banat	45.59°N 20.46°E	1700	Unknown	Tornado observed in Torda causing damage to roofs
Sources: ESSL Severe Weather Database

== April ==
=== April 1 event ===
List of reported tornadoes - Monday, April 1, 2013
F#	T#	Location	District/ County	Coord.	Time (UTC)	Path length	Comments/Damage
Turkey
F?	T?	Bozyer	Muğla	37.33°N 28.60°E	0900	Unknown	Some cars were moved and greenhouses were damaged
Sources: ESSL Severe Weather Database

=== April 15 event ===
List of reported tornadoes - Monday, April 15, 2013
F#	T#	Location	District/ County	Coord.	Time (UTC)	Path length	Comments/Damage
Turkey
F1	T?	Çaybağı	Elazığ	38.70°N 39.63°E	0700	Unknown	Several homes damaged, some with their roof blown off. Power lines were also downed.
F?	T?	Emirşah	Mersin	36.08°N 32.79°E	1530	12 kilometres (7.5 mi)	Tornado damaged homes, greenhouses, and downed power lines. One person was injured.
Sources: ESSL Severe Weather Database

=== April 27 event ===
List of reported tornadoes - Saturday, April 27, 2013
F#	T#	Location	District/ County	Coord.	Time (UTC)	Path length	Comments/Damage
Italy
F0	T?	Brugine	Padua	45.30°N 11.99°E	1613	0.15 kilometres (0.093 mi)	Brief tornado caused minor roof damage to one home and snapped small trees.
Sources: ESSL Severe Weather Database

== May ==
=== May 3 event ===
List of reported tornadoes - Friday, May 3, 2013
F#	T#	Location	District/ County	Coord.	Time (UTC)	Path length	Comments/Damage
Italy
F?	T?	San Giorgio di Piano	Bologna	44.64°N 11.39°E	1445	Unknown	One of three tornadoes produced by a powerful supercell thunderstorm in the Emilia-Romagna region. This tornado was the most intense of the three and injured 13 people. Many homes were damaged and a state of emergency was declared for the region. It was accompanied by very large hail, measured at 8 cm (3.1 in) in diameter.
F2	T?	Mirandola	Modena	44.94°N 11.23°E	1515	15 kilometres (9.3 mi)	Second of three tornadoes produced by a supercell thunderstorm in the Emilia-Romagna region.
Sources: ESSL Severe Weather Database

=== May 4 event ===
List of reported tornadoes - Saturday, May 4, 2013
F#	T#	Location	District/ County	Coord.	Time (UTC)	Path length	Comments/Damage
Germany
F?	T?	Flonheim	Rhineland-Palatinate	49.78°N 8.04°E	1630	Unknown	Brief tornado with no damage
Sources: ESSL Severe Weather Database

=== May 7 event ===
List of reported tornadoes - Tuesday, May 7, 2013
F#	T#	Location	District/ County	Coord.	Time (UTC)	Path length	Comments/Damage
Czech Republic
F?	T?	Spořice	Ústí nad Labem	50.44°N 13.39°E	1350	Unknown	Brief tornado tossed a slide 4 m (13 ft) and damaged a garden
Croatia
F?	T?	Lepoglava	Varaždin	46.21°N 16.04°E	1630	Unknown	Brief tornado with no damage
Sources: ESSL Severe Weather Database

=== May 11 event ===
List of reported tornadoes - Saturday, May 11, 2013
F#	T#	Location	District/ County	Coord.	Time (UTC)	Path length	Comments/Damage
Turkey
F?	T?	Kızıltepe	Mardin	37.19°N 40.59°E	1400	Unknown	1 death – A possible tornado struck Kızıltepe, killing one person.
Sources: ESSL Severe Weather Database

=== May 12 event ===
List of reported tornadoes - Sunday, May 12, 2013
F#	T#	Location	District/ County	Coord.	Time (UTC)	Path length	Comments/Damage
Germany
F?	T?	Minsener Oog	Lower Saxony	53.75°N 8.02°E	0830	Unknown	Tornado observed over Minsener Oog
Hungary
F?	T?	Őr	Szabolcs-Szatmár-Bereg	47.98°N 22.20°E	1315	Unknown	Tornado struck Őr, injuring two people.
Italy
F?	T?	Iesi	Ancona	43.51°N 13.23°E	1330	Unknown	Tornado damaged homes and downed trees.
Sources: ESSL Severe Weather Database

=== May 14 event ===
List of reported tornadoes - Tuesday, May 14, 2013
F#	T#	Location	District/ County	Coord.	Time (UTC)	Path length	Comments/Damage
Turkey
F?	T?	Kargılı	Mersin	36.93°N 35.07°E	1000	Unknown	2 deaths – A tornado struck Mersin Province in coastal Turkey, killing two people and injuring 19 others after it struck a construction site.
Sources: ESSL Severe Weather Database

=== May 18 event ===
List of reported tornadoes - Saturday, May 18, 2013
F#	T#	Location	District/ County	Coord.	Time (UTC)	Path length	Comments/Damage
France
F0	T?	Sainte-Maxime	Var	43.22°N 6.66°E	0638	1.1 kilometres (0.68 mi)	Waterspout moved onshore in Nartelle within Sainte-Maxime
Turkey
F?	T?	Kabaçayır	Bayburt	40.22°N 40.18°E	1000	Unknown	Thirteen buildings sustained roof damage
F?	T?	Canaptal	Sivas	39.65°N 36.27°E	1200	Unknown	Three buildings sustained roof damage and two cars were damaged
Estonia
F?	T?	Hummuli	Valga	57.90°N 26.06°E	1600	Unknown	One building lost its roof
Sources: ESSL Severe Weather Database

=== May 20 event ===
List of reported tornadoes - Monday, May 20, 2013
F#	T#	Location	District/ County	Coord.	Time (UTC)	Path length	Comments/Damage
Ukraine
F?	T?	Novoselivka	Poltava	50.01°N 32.72°E	1100	Unknown	Landspout tornado
Sources: ESSL Severe Weather Database

=== May 22 event ===
List of reported tornadoes - Wednesday, May 22, 2013
F#	T#	Location	District/ County	Coord.	Time (UTC)	Path length	Comments/Damage
Russia
F2	T?	Yefremov	Tula	53.15°N 38.09°E	1430	Unknown	Tornado confirmed by video. A total of 200 homes were damaged and losses amounted to 100 million rubles (US$31.9 million).
Sources: ESSL Severe Weather Database

=== May 23 event ===
List of reported tornadoes - Thursday, May 23, 2013
F#	T#	Location	District/ County	Coord.	Time (UTC)	Path length	Comments/Damage
Russia
F1	T?	Barsuki	Kaluga	54.83°N 35.59°E	0000	Unknown	Tornado damaged homes and downed power lines
F?	T?	Obninsk	Kaluga	55.08°N 36.57°E	1520	Unknown	Tornado confirmed by video
Lithuania
F1	T2	Šimkaičiai	Tauragė	55.87°N 23.49°E	1000	Unknown	Tornado damaged 196 homes.
Romania
F2	T4	Drăgușeni	Galați	46.01°N 27.76°E	1500	5.5 kilometres (3.4 mi)	29 homes were damaged or destroyed
France
F0	T?	Macheren	Moselle	49.10°N 6.77°E	1700	0.8 kilometres (0.50 mi)	Tornado confirmed by video
Germany
F?	T?	Finthen	Rhineland-Palatinate	49.99°N 8.17°E	1838	Unknown	Plausible tornado
Sources: ESSL Severe Weather Database

=== May 24 event ===
List of reported tornadoes - Friday, May 24, 2013
F#	T#	Location	District/ County	Coord.	Time (UTC)	Path length	Comments/Damage
Italy
F?	T?	Chioggia	Venice	45.23°N 12.29°E	1100	Unknown	Waterspout briefly moved onshore
Russia
F?	T?	Zaymishche	Bryansk	52.70°N 32.24°E	1130	Unknown	Homes damaged and numerous trees downed
F?	T?	Avdot'ino	Moscow	55.92°N 38.23°E	1300	Unknown	Homes damaged
Sources: ESSL Severe Weather Database

=== May 25 event ===
List of reported tornadoes - Saturday, May 25, 2013
F#	T#	Location	District/ County	Coord.	Time (UTC)	Path length	Comments/Damage
Russia
F?	T?	Volovo	Tula	53.56°N 38.01°E	1000	Unknown	Tornado reported
Italy
F?	T?	Mirabella	Veneto	45.68°N 11.55°E	1435	Unknown	Landspout tornado
Sources: ESSL Severe Weather Database

=== May 26 event ===
List of reported tornadoes - Sunday, May 26, 2013
F#	T#	Location	District/ County	Coord.	Time (UTC)	Path length	Comments/Damage
Ukraine
F?	T?	Novomoskovsk	Dnipropetrovsk	48.64°N 35.15°E	1200	Unknown	Tornado reported
Sources: ESSL Severe Weather Database

=== May 27 event ===
List of reported tornadoes - Monday, May 27, 2013
F#	T#	Location	District/ County	Coord.	Time (UTC)	Path length	Comments/Damage
Russia
F?	T?	Unknown	Tula	53.65°N 38.41°E	1000	Unknown	Tornado reported
Belarus
F?	T?	Baranovichi	Brest	53.10°N 26.00°E	1330	Unknown	Tornado damaged homes in Baranovichi
Sources: ESSL Severe Weather Database

=== May 29 event ===
List of reported tornadoes - Wednesday, May 29, 2013
F#	T#	Location	District/ County	Coord.	Time (UTC)	Path length	Comments/Damage
Italy
F1	T?	Cavenago di Brianza	Monza and Brianza	45.58°N 9.41°E	0930	1.2 kilometres	Confirmed tornado
Germany
F1	T2	Lockwitz	Saxony	50.98°N 13.71°E	0945	0.4 kilometres (0.25 mi)	Confirmed tornado
Netherlands
F?	T?	Amsterdam Airport Schiphol	North Holland	52.30°N 4.75°E	1500	Unknown	Possible tornado
F?	T?	Meppel	Drenthe	52.70°N 6.19°E	1544	Unknown	Possible tornado
France
F0	T?	Aiguillon	Lot-et-Garonne	44.30°N 0.35°E	1500	Unknown	Brief EF0 tornado caused minor damage to a market and farm.
Sources: ESSL Severe Weather Database

=== May 30 event ===
List of reported tornadoes - Thursday, May 30, 2013
F#	T#	Location	District/ County	Coord.	Time (UTC)	Path length	Comments/Damage
Hungary
F?	T?	Kunmadaras	Jász-Nagykun-Szolnok	47.43°N 20.80°E	1129	Unknown	Possible tornado
Slovakia
F?	T?	Kalinovo	Poltár	48.40°N 19.72°E	1508	Unknown	Possible tornado
Poland
F?	T?	Buczek	Łask	51.52°N 19.17°E	1600	Unknown	Confirmed tornado
F1	T3	Chojne to Redzeń	Łask	51.55°N 18.82°E	1600	Unknown	Tornado touched down near Chojne and downed many trees and power poles.
Sources: ESSL Severe Weather Database

== June ==
=== June 19 event ===
List of reported tornadoes - Wednesday, June 19, 2013
F#	T#	Location	District/ County	Coord.	Time (UTC)	Path length	Comments/Damage
France
F3	T?	WSW of Châtillon-sur-Seine to NE of Montliot-et-Courcelles	Côte-d'Or	47.88°N 4.53°E	1540	14 kilometres (8.7 mi)	See section on this tornado – Low-end F3 tornado moved along an intermittent path near Châtillon-sur-Seine. A total of 20 homes were severely damaged or destroyed while 190 more sustained varying degrees of damage. One person sustained minor injuries in relation to the tornado. This was the strongest tornado in France since the deadly 2008 F4 Hautmont tornado.
Sources: ESSL Severe Weather Database
