= Borzewisko =

Borzewisko refers to the following places in Poland:

- Borzewisko, Poddębice County
- Borzewisko, Sieradz County
