= Okręglica =

Okręglica may refer to the following places:

- Okręglica, Greater Poland Voivodeship (west-central Poland)
- Okręglica, Łódź Voivodeship (central Poland)
- Okręglica, Świętokrzyskie Voivodeship (south-central Poland)
