= Kłocko =

- Village
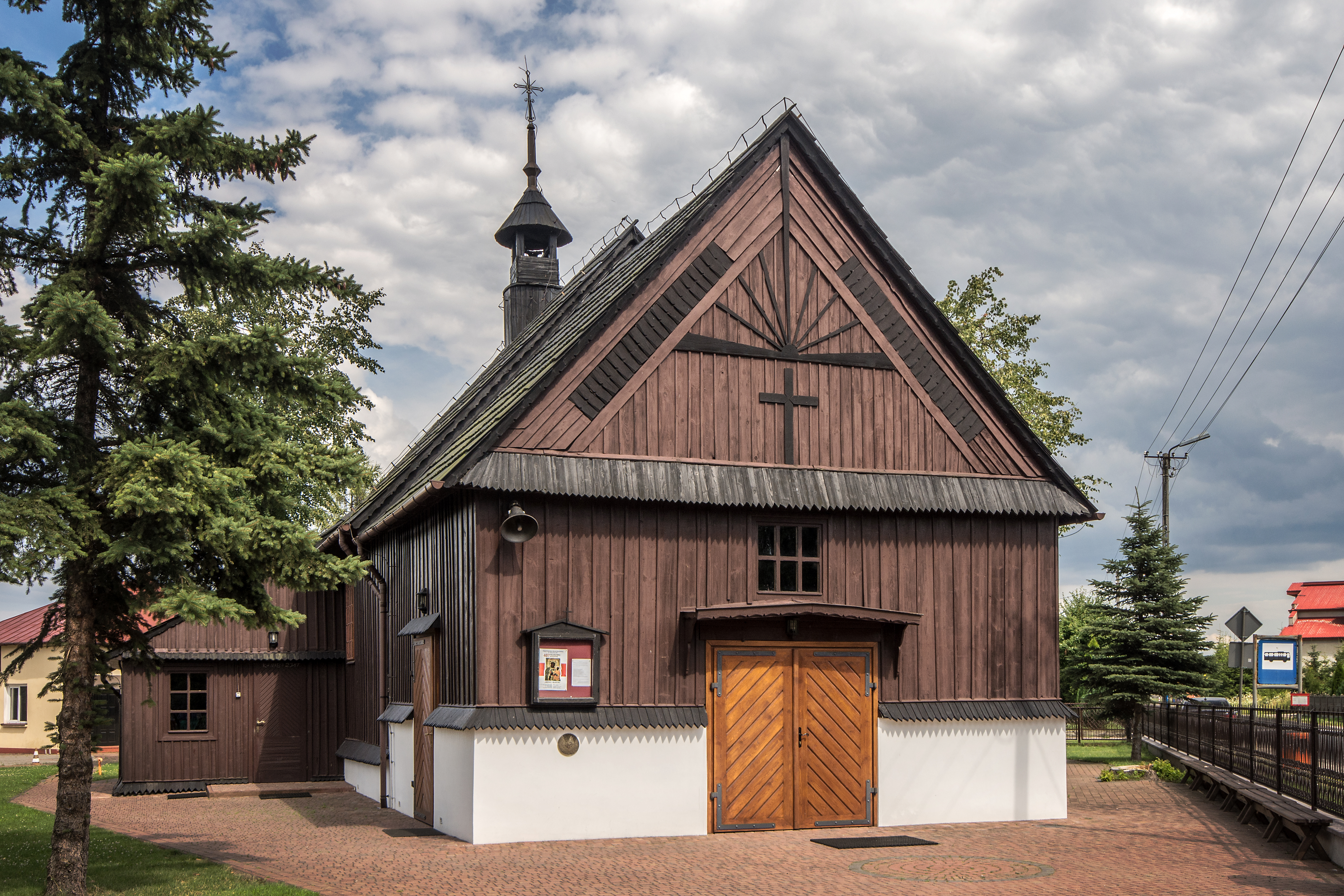
- Saint Valentine church in Kłocko

- Location within Poland
- Coordinates: 51°34′12″N 18°40′25″E
- Country: Poland
- Voivodeship: Łódź
- County: Sieradz
- Gmina: Sieradz

Population
  - Total: 850
- Time zone: UTC+1 (CET)
  - Summer (DST): UTC+2 (CEST)
- Vehicle registration: ESI

Kłocko [ˈkwɔt͡skɔ] is a village in the administrative district of Gmina Sieradz, within Sieradz County, Łódź Voivodeship, in central Poland.

== History ==
During the German occupation of Poland in World War II, in 1940, the German gendarmerie carried out expulsions of Poles, who were either sent to forced labour in the county or deported to the General Government in the more-eastern part of German-occupied Poland, while their houses and farms were handed over to German colonists.

In 1979, a part of the village was included within the town limits of Sieradz as its new neighborhood.
