= Sokołów, Gmina Sieradz =

Sokołów
- Village
- Location within Poland
- Coordinates: 51°30′53″N 18°44′8″E
- Country: Poland
- Voivodeship: Łódź
- County: Sieradz
- Gmina: Sieradz

Sokołów [sɔˈkɔwuf] is a village in the administrative district of Gmina Sieradz, within Sieradz County, Łódź Voivodeship, in central Poland.
