= Charłupia Mała =

- Village
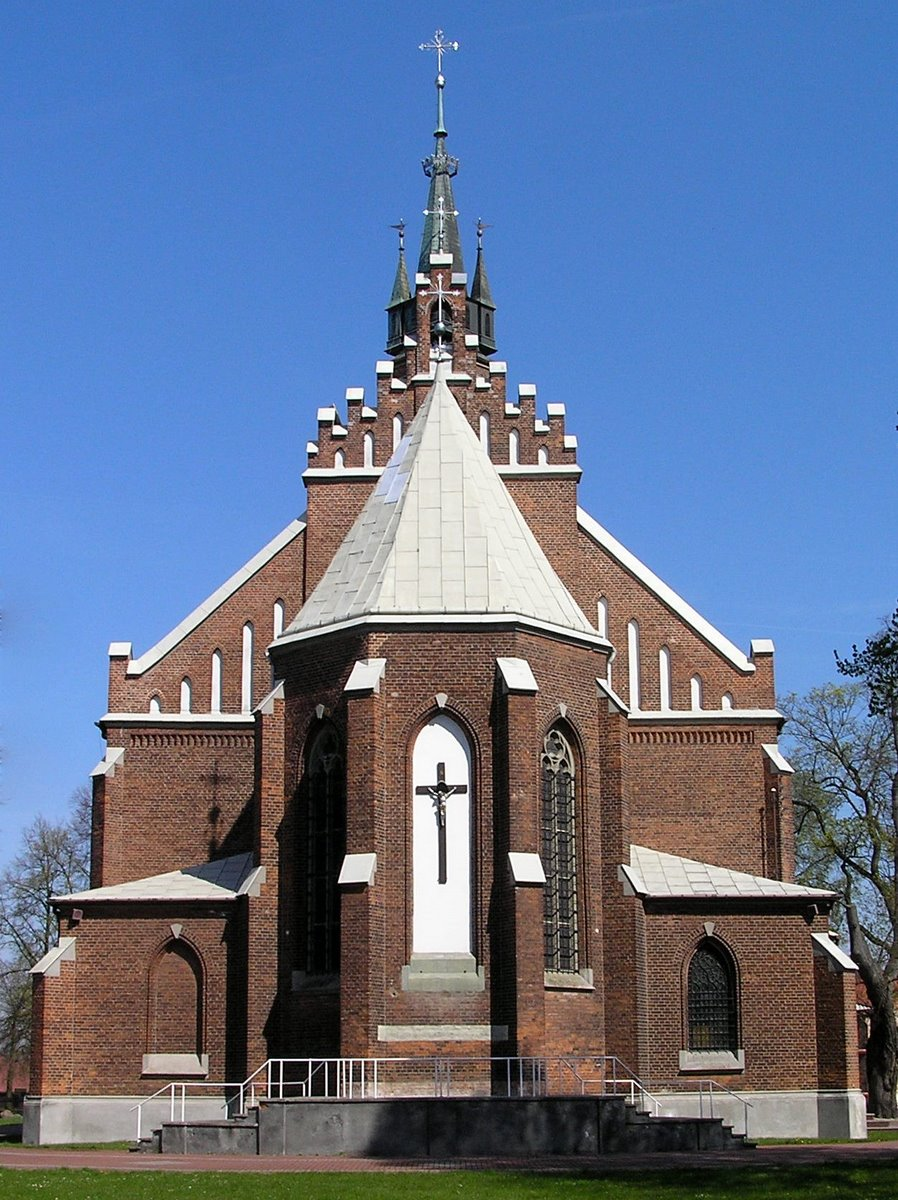
- Catholic church

- Location within Poland
- Coordinates: 51°37′N 18°41′E
- Country: Poland
- Voivodeship: Łódź
- County: Sieradz
- Gmina: Sieradz
- Population: 680

Charłupia Mała [xarˈwupja ˈmawa] is a village in the administrative district of Gmina Sieradz, within Sieradz County, Łódź Voivodeship, in central Poland.
