= Mnichów, Łódź Voivodeship =

Mnichów
- Village
- Location within Poland
- Coordinates: 51°37′29″N 18°44′15″E
- Country: Poland
- Voivodeship: Łódź
- County: Sieradz
- Gmina: Sieradz

Mnichów [ˈmnixuf] is a village in the administrative district of Gmina Sieradz, within Sieradz County, Łódź Voivodeship, in central Poland.

== History ==
It was probably founded by canons regular from the nearby village of Męka. It was first mentioned in 1413. At that time it was the property of Jan Kożuszek.

In the southern part of the village, on a sand dune, a circular fortified settlement with a diameter of 80 meters at the base has been preserved. As a result of research carried out in 1962, it was established that in the 6th-8th century there was a stronghold here, built on an older settlement from the period of migration of peoples - probably the oldest center of territorial and tribal authority in the Sieradz region.

On September 4–5, 1939, heavy fighting between the 31st Kaniowski Rifle Regiment from Sieradz and the German 10th Infantry Division took place here. On the eastern edge of the village there is a battle shelter for HMG personnel, where the Polish crew defended themselves until they lost their lives.
