= Stoczki, Sieradz County =

Stoczki
- Village
- Location within Poland
- Coordinates: 51°31′8″N 18°47′28″E
- Country: Poland
- Voivodeship: Łódź
- County: Sieradz
- Gmina: Sieradz

Stoczki [ˈstɔt͡ʂki] is a village in the administrative district of Gmina Sieradz, within Sieradz County, Łódź Voivodeship, in central Poland.
