= Gmina Kluczewsko =

Gmina Kluczewsko Kluczewsko Commune
- Gmina
- Flag Coat of arms
- Interactive map of Gmina Kluczewsko
- Coordinates (Kluczewsko): 50°55′38″N 19°55′16″E
- Country: Poland
- Voivodeship: Świętokrzyskie
- County: Włoszczowa
- Seat: Kluczewsko

Area
  - Total: 137.05 km^{2} (52.92 sq mi)

Population (2006)
  - Total: 5,191
  - Density: 37.88/km^{2} (98.10/sq mi)
- Postal code: 29-120
- Area code: +48 44
- Car plates: TLW
- Website: http://www.kluczewsko.gmina.pl/

Gmina Kluczewsko is a rural gmina (administrative district) in Włoszczowa County, Świętokrzyskie Voivodeship, in south-central Poland. Its seat is the village of Kluczewsko, which lies approximately 9 kilometres (6 mi) north of Włoszczowa and 50 km (31 mi) west of the regional capital Kielce.

The gmina covers an area of 137.05 square kilometres (52.9 sq mi), and as of 2006 its total population is 5,191.

The gmina contains part of the protected area called Przedbórz Landscape Park.

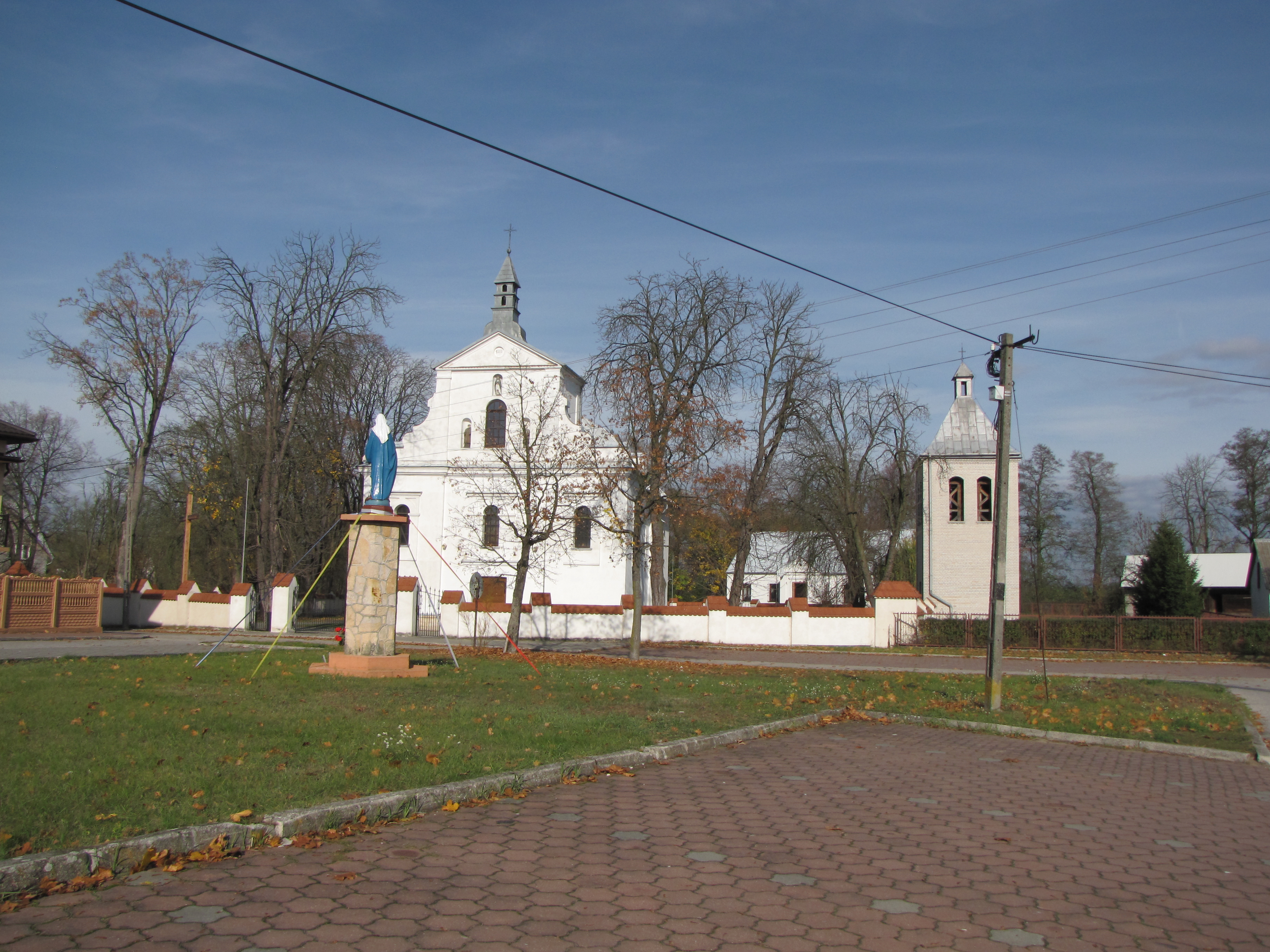

== Villages ==
Gmina Kluczewsko contains the villages and settlements of Bobrowniki, Bobrowska Wola, Boża Wola, Brzeście, Ciemiętniki, Dąbrowy, Dobromierz, Jakubowice, Januszewice, Jeżowiec, Kąparzów, Kluczewsko, Kolonia Bobrowska Wola, Kolonia Łapczyna Wola, Komorniki, Łapczyna Wola, Miedziana Góra, Mrowina, Mrowina-Kolonia, Nowiny, Pilczyca, Pilczyca-Kolonia, Praczka, Rączki, Rzewuszyce, Stanowiska, Zabrodzie, Zalesie and Zmarłe.

== Neighbouring gminas ==
Gmina Kluczewsko is bordered by the gminas of Krasocin, Przedbórz, Wielgomłyny, Włoszczowa and Żytno.
