= Dzierlin =

- Village
- Location within Poland
- Coordinates: 51°38′N 18°41′E
- Country: Poland
- Voivodeship: Łódź
- County: Sieradz
- Gmina: Sieradz

Dzierlin [ˈd͡ʑɛrlin] is a village in the administrative district of Gmina Sieradz, within Sieradz County, Łódź Voivodeship, in central Poland.
