= Bobrowska Wola =

- Village
- Location within Poland
- Coordinates: 50°58′17″N 19°53′8″E
- Country: Poland
- Voivodeship: Świętokrzyskie
- County: Włoszczowa
- Gmina: Kluczewsko

Bobrowska Wola [bɔˈbrɔfska ˈvɔla] is a village in the administrative district of Gmina Kluczewsko, within Włoszczowa County, Świętokrzyskie Voivodeship, in south-central Poland. It lies approximately 6 km (4 mi) north-west of Kluczewsko, 15 km (9 mi) north-west of Włoszczowa, and 53 km (33 mi) west of the regional capital Kielce.
