= Wiechucice =

- Village
- Location within Poland
- Coordinates: 51°33′N 18°47′E
- Country: Poland
- Voivodeship: Łódź
- County: Sieradz
- Gmina: Sieradz
- Time zone: UTC+1 (CET)
  - Summer (DST): UTC+2 (CEST)
- Vehicle registration: ESI

Wiechucice [vjɛxuˈt͡ɕit͡sɛ] is a village in the administrative district of Gmina Sieradz, within Sieradz County, Łódź Voivodeship, in central Poland.

== History ==
During the German occupation of Poland in World War II, in 1941, the German gendarmerie expelled the entire population of the village, which was deported to the Radom District in the more-eastern part of German-occupied Poland, as the occupiers established a military training ground.

In c. 1950, a hoard of 20 coins from the 17th century was found in the village. The hoard was hidden after 1699.
