= Męcka Wola =

Village in Łódź Voivodeship, Poland

- Village
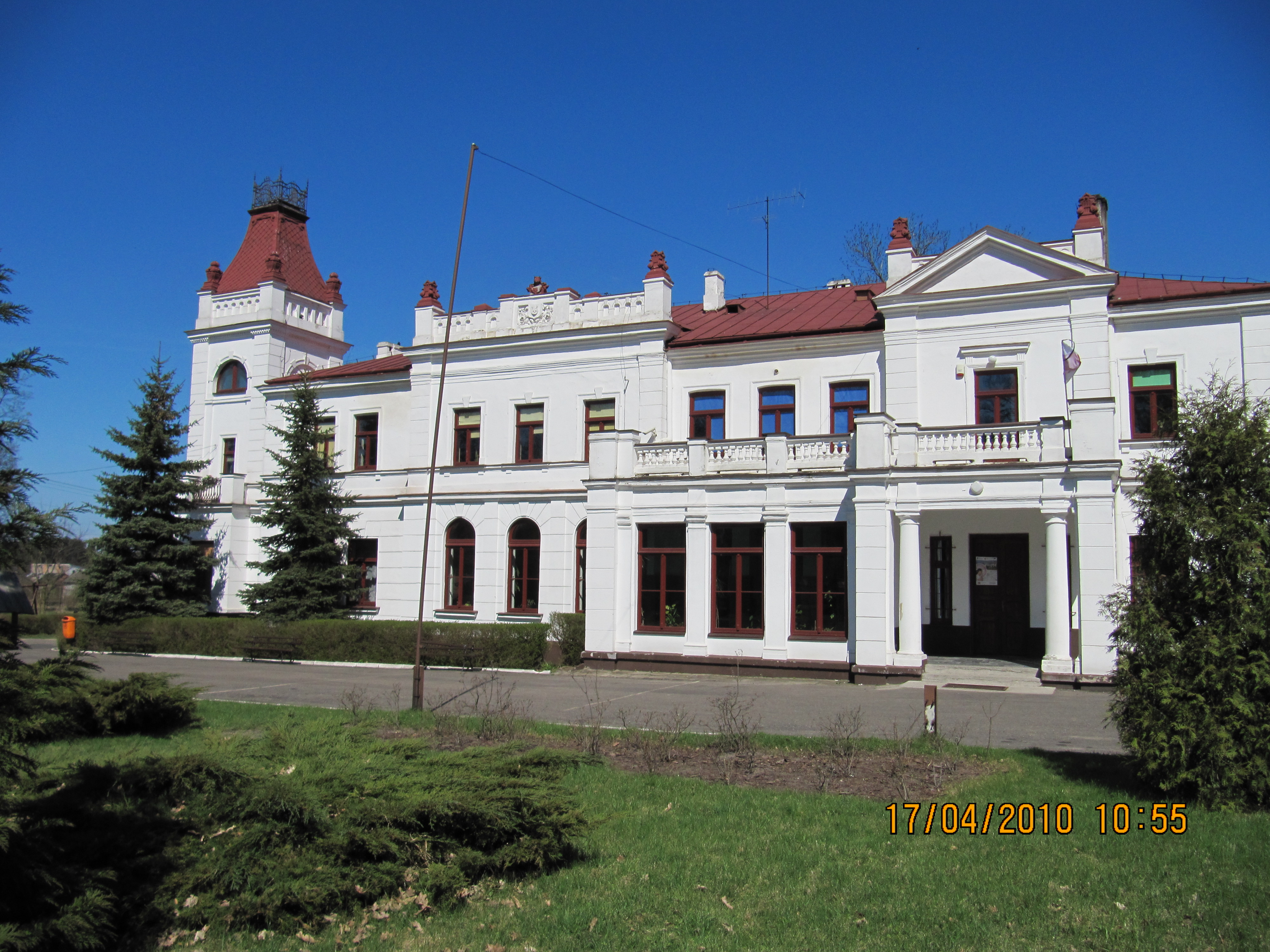
- Manor

- Location within Poland
- Coordinates: 51°36′46″N 18°49′6″E
- Country: Poland
- Voivodeship: Łódź
- County: Sieradz
- Gmina: Sieradz

Męcka Wola [ˈmɛnt͡ska ˈvɔla] is a village in the administrative district of Gmina Sieradz, within Sieradz County, Łódź Voivodeship, in central Poland.
