= Chałupki, Sieradz County =

Chałupki
- Village
- Location within Poland
- Coordinates: 51°33′59″N 18°48′9″E
- Country: Poland
- Voivodeship: Łódź
- County: Sieradz
- Gmina: Sieradz

Chałupki [xaˈwupki] is a village located in the administrative district of Gmina Sieradz, within Sieradz County, Łódź Voivodeship, in central Poland.
