= Dębina, Sieradz County =

Dębina
- Village
- Location within Poland
- Coordinates: 51°30′28″N 18°46′2″E
- Country: Poland
- Voivodeship: Łódź
- County: Sieradz
- Gmina: Sieradz

Dębina [dɛmˈbina] is a village in the administrative district of Gmina Sieradz, within Sieradz County, Łódź Voivodeship, in central Poland.
