= Kuśnie =

- Village
- Location within Poland
- Coordinates: 51°32′0″N 18°41′7″E
- Country: Poland
- Voivodeship: Łódź
- County: Sieradz
- Gmina: Sieradz

Kuśnie [ˈkuɕɲɛ] is a village in the administrative district of Gmina Sieradz, within Sieradz County, Łódź Voivodeship, in central Poland.
