= Kamionaczyk =

- Village
- Location within Poland
- Coordinates: 51°39′47″N 18°43′31″E
- Country: Poland
- Voivodeship: Łódź
- County: Sieradz
- Gmina: Sieradz

Kamionaczyk [kamjɔˈnat͡ʂɨk] is a village in the administrative district of Gmina Sieradz, within Sieradz County, Łódź Voivodeship, in central Poland.
