= Grądy, Sieradz County =

Grądy
- Village
- Location within Poland
- Coordinates: 51°39′26″N 18°42′15″E
- Country: Poland
- Voivodeship: Łódź
- County: Sieradz
- Gmina: Sieradz

Grądy [ˈɡrɔndɨ] is a village in the administrative district of Gmina Sieradz, within Sieradz County, Łódź Voivodeship, in central Poland.
