= Sucha, Łódź Voivodeship =

Sucha
- Village
- Location within Poland
- Coordinates: 51°38′N 18°42′E
- Country: Poland
- Voivodeship: Łódź
- County: Sieradz
- Gmina: Sieradz
- Population: 240

Sucha [ˈsuxa] is a village in the administrative district of Gmina Sieradz, within Sieradz County, Łódź Voivodeship, in central Poland.
