= Biskupice, Łódź Voivodeship =

Biskupice
- Village
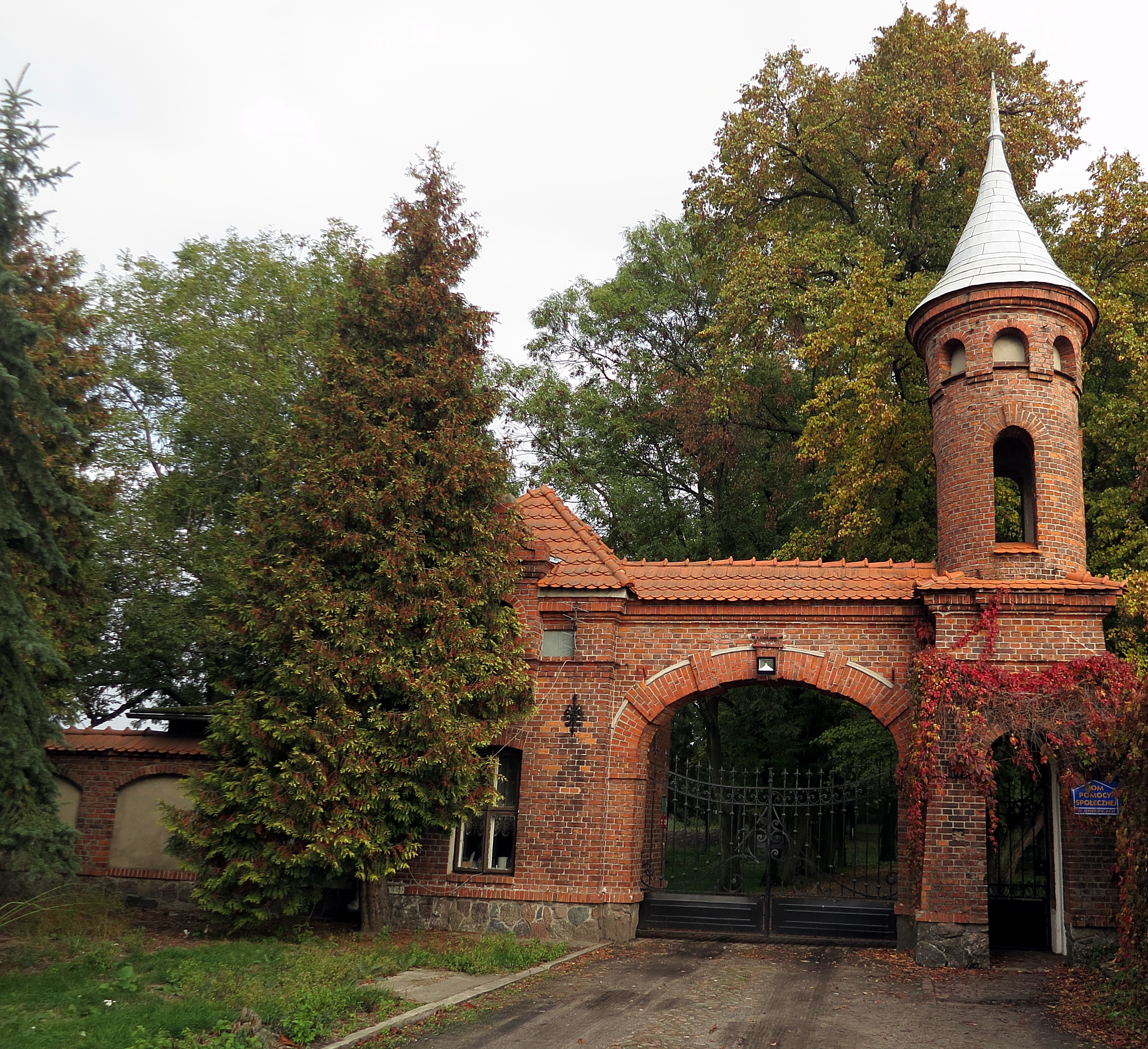
- Entrance gate to the Biskupice Palace park

- Location within Poland
- Coordinates: 51°38′51″N 18°39′55″E
- Country: Poland
- Voivodeship: Łódź
- County: Sieradz
- Gmina: Sieradz

Population
  - Total: 560

Biskupice [biskuˈpit͡sɛ] is a village in the administrative district of Gmina Sieradz, within Sieradz County, Łódź Voivodeship, in central Poland.
