= Łosieniec =

- Village
- Location within Poland
- Coordinates: 51°37′N 18°39′E
- Country: Poland
- Voivodeship: Łódź
- County: Sieradz
- Gmina: Sieradz

Łosieniec [wɔˈɕɛɲɛt͡s] is a village in the administrative district of Gmina Sieradz, within Sieradz County, Łódź Voivodeship, in central Poland.
