= Brzeście, Gmina Kluczewsko =

Brzeście
- Village
- Location within Poland
- Coordinates: 50°53′55″N 19°55′48″E
- Country: Poland
- Voivodeship: Świętokrzyskie
- County: Włoszczowa
- Gmina: Kluczewsko

Brzeście [ˈbʐɛɕt͡ɕɛ] is a village in the administrative district of Gmina Kluczewsko, within Włoszczowa County, Świętokrzyskie Voivodeship, in south-central Poland. It lies approximately 4 km (2 mi) south of Kluczewsko, 6 km (4 mi) north-west of Włoszczowa, and 49 km (30 mi) west of the regional capital Kielce.
