= Gmina Sieradz =

Gmina Sieradz Sieradz Commune
- Gmina
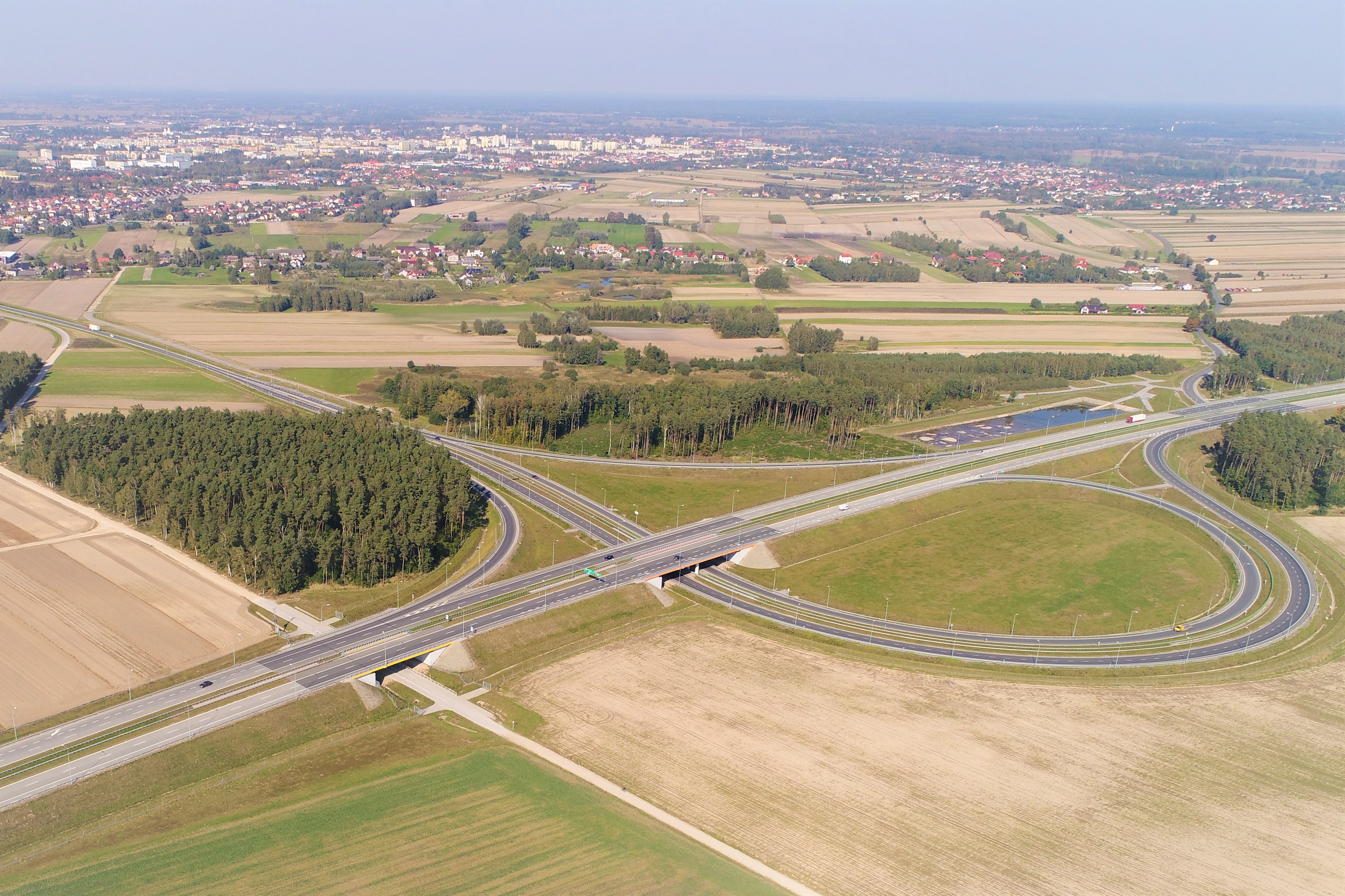

- Flag Coat of arms
- Interactive map of Gmina Sieradz
- Coordinates (Sieradz): 51°36′N 18°45′E
- Country: Poland
- Voivodeship: Łódź
- County: Sieradz
- Seat: Sieradz

Area
  - Total: 181.63 km^{2} (70.13 sq mi)

Population (2006)
  - Total: 9,788
  - Density: 53.89/km^{2} (139.6/sq mi)
- Car plates: ESI
- Website: www.ugsieradz.pl

Gmina Sieradz is a rural gmina (administrative district) in Sieradz County, Łódź Voivodeship, in central Poland. Its seat is the town of Sieradz, although the town is not part of the territory of the gmina.

The gmina covers an area of 181.63 square kilometres (70.1 sq mi), and as of 2006 its total population is 9,788.

The gmina contains part of the protected area called Warta-Widawka Landscape Park.

== Villages ==
Gmina Sieradz contains the villages and settlements of:

- Biskupice
- Bobrowniki
- Bogumiłów
- Borzewisko
- Chałupki
- Charłupia Mała
- Chojne
- Czartki
- Dąbrowa Wielka
- Dąbrówka
- Dębina
- Dzierlin
- Dzigorzew
- Grabowiec
- Grądy
- Kamionaczyk
- Kłocko
- Kolonia Okręglica
- Kowale
- Kuśnie
- Łosieniec
- Męcka Wola
- Mnichów
- Okręglica
- Podłężyce
- Ruda
- Rzechta
- Sokołów
- Stoczki
- Sucha
- Wiechucice

== Neighbouring gminas ==
Gmina Sieradz is bordered by the town of Sieradz and by the gminas of Brzeźnio, Burzenin, Warta, Wróblew, Zapolice and Zduńska Wola.
