= Bobrowniki, Świętokrzyskie Voivodeship =

Bobrowniki
- Village
- Location within Poland
- Coordinates: 50°58′15″N 19°50′30″E
- Country: Poland
- Voivodeship: Świętokrzyskie
- County: Włoszczowa
- Gmina: Kluczewsko

Bobrowniki [bɔbrɔvˈniki] is a village in the administrative district of Gmina Kluczewsko, within Włoszczowa County, Świętokrzyskie Voivodeship, in south-central Poland. It lies approximately 8 km (5 mi) north-west of Kluczewsko, 16 km (10 mi) north-west of Włoszczowa, and 56 km (35 mi) west of the regional capital Kielce.
