= Raczki =

Raczki may refer to:

- Raczki, Masovian Voivodeship (east-central Poland)
- Raczki, Podlaskie Voivodeship (north-east Poland)
- Raczki, West Pomeranian Voivodeship (north-west Poland)
- Rączki, Świętokrzyskie Voivodeship (south-central Poland)
- Rączki, Warmian-Masurian Voivodeship (north Poland)
