= Kolonia Okręglica =

Village in Gmina Sieradz, Poland

- Village
- Location within Poland
- Coordinates: 51°31′35″N 18°44′48″E
- Country: Poland
- Voivodeship: Łódź
- County: Sieradz
- Gmina: Sieradz

Kolonia Okręglica [kɔˈlɔɲa ɔkrɛnˈɡlit͡sa] is a village in the administrative district of Gmina Sieradz, within Sieradz County, Łódź Voivodeship, in central Poland.
