= Grabowiec, Sieradz County =

Grabowiec
- Village
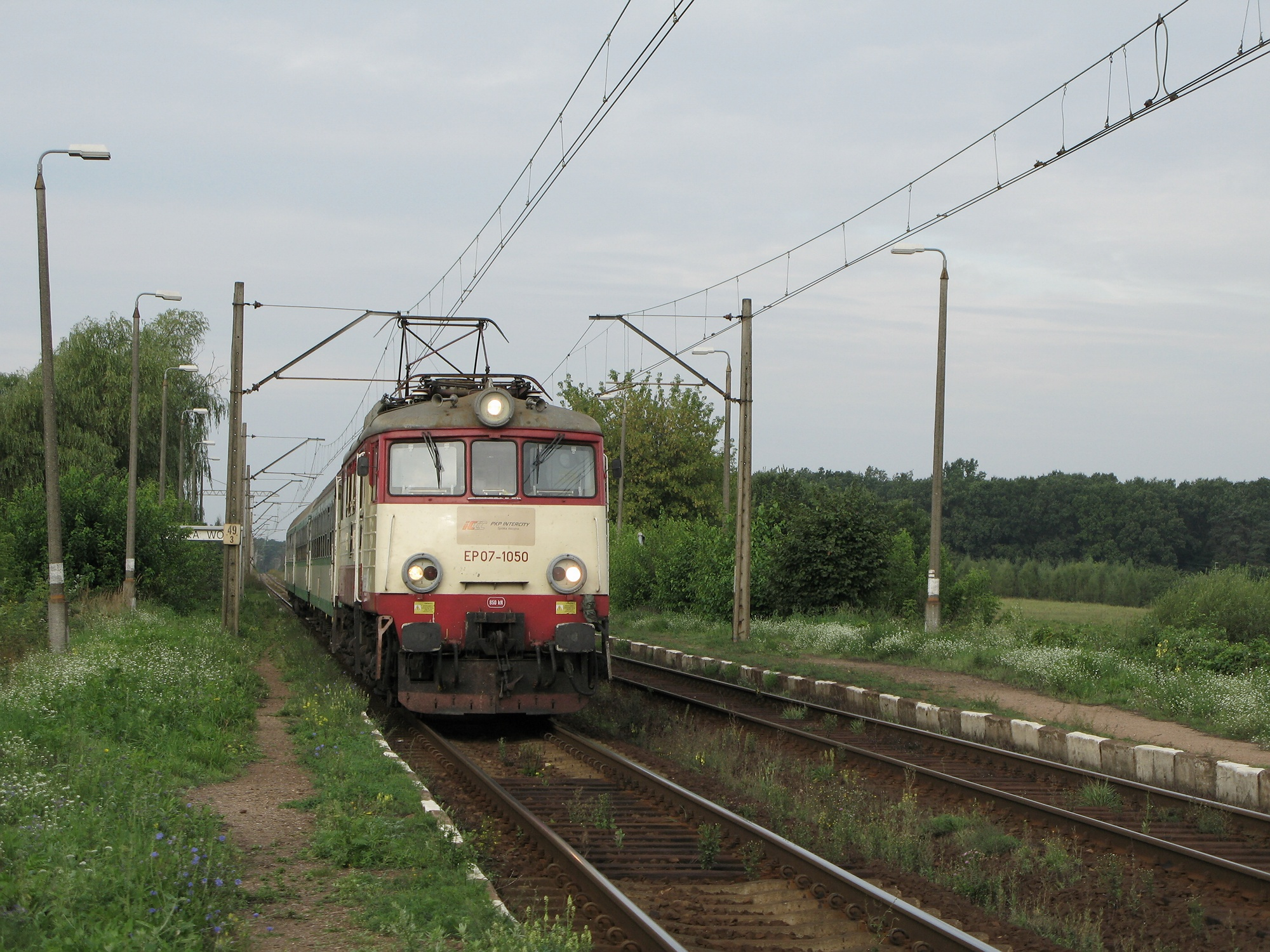
- Railway station

- Location within Poland
- Coordinates: 51°36′19″N 18°50′53″E
- Country: Poland
- Voivodeship: Łódź
- County: Sieradz
- Gmina: Sieradz

Grabowiec [ɡraˈbɔvjɛt͡s] is a village in the administrative district of Gmina Sieradz, within Sieradz County, Łódź Voivodeship, in central Poland.
