= Rzechta, Łódź Voivodeship =

Rzechta
- Village
- Location within Poland
- Coordinates: 51°35′36″N 18°50′53″E
- Country: Poland
- Voivodeship: Łódź
- County: Sieradz
- Gmina: Sieradz

Rzechta [ˈʐɛxta] is a village in the administrative district of Gmina Sieradz, within Sieradz County, Łódź Voivodeship, in central Poland.

Rzechta is the location of the annual two-day celebrations of Święto Plinzy (Plinza festival) holiday devoted to – among other things – the traditional potato pancake cookery. The pancakes, known as placki ziemniaczane in Polish have a long history in Poland, with recipes dating back to the 17th-century Catholic monasteries. The largest potato pancake (possibly in the world) measuring 2 meters and 2 centimeters was made during the Rzechta festival in 2011 (see photo). The tongue-in-cheek games in Rzechta include the throwing of bad potato pancake, with the record of 29 meters.
