= Praczka =

- Village
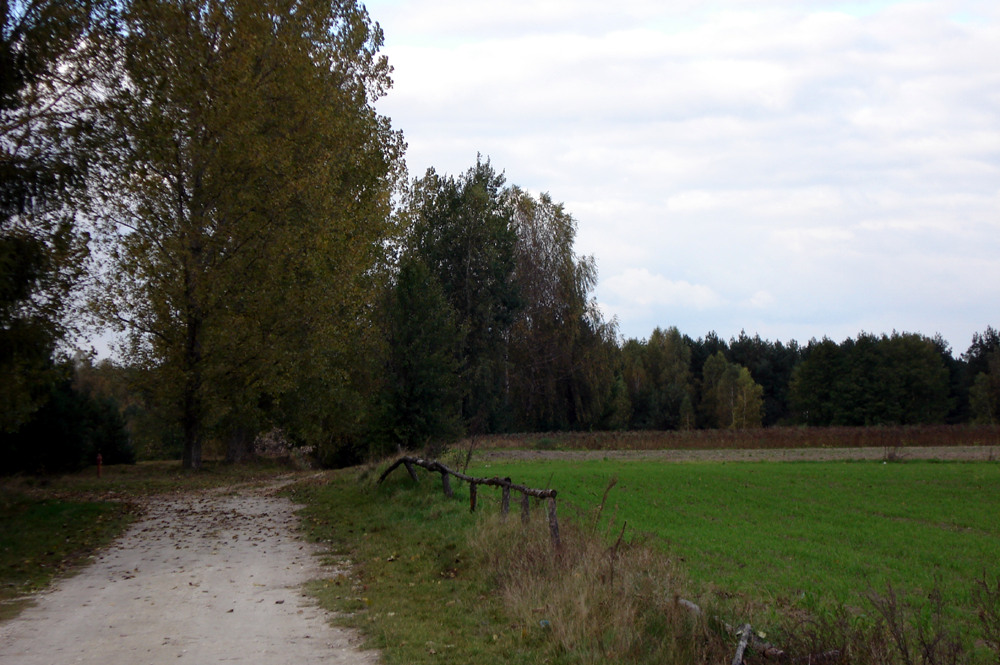
- Praczka village, view towards the Czarna Włoszczowska river.

- Location within Poland
- Coordinates: 50°55′29″N 19°52′17″E
- Country: Poland
- Voivodeship: Świętokrzyskie
- County: Włoszczowa
- Gmina: Kluczewsko

Praczka [ˈprat͡ʂka] is a village in the administrative district of Gmina Kluczewsko, within Włoszczowa County, Świętokrzyskie Voivodeship, in south-central Poland.
