= Bogumiłów, Sieradz County =

Bogumiłów
- Village
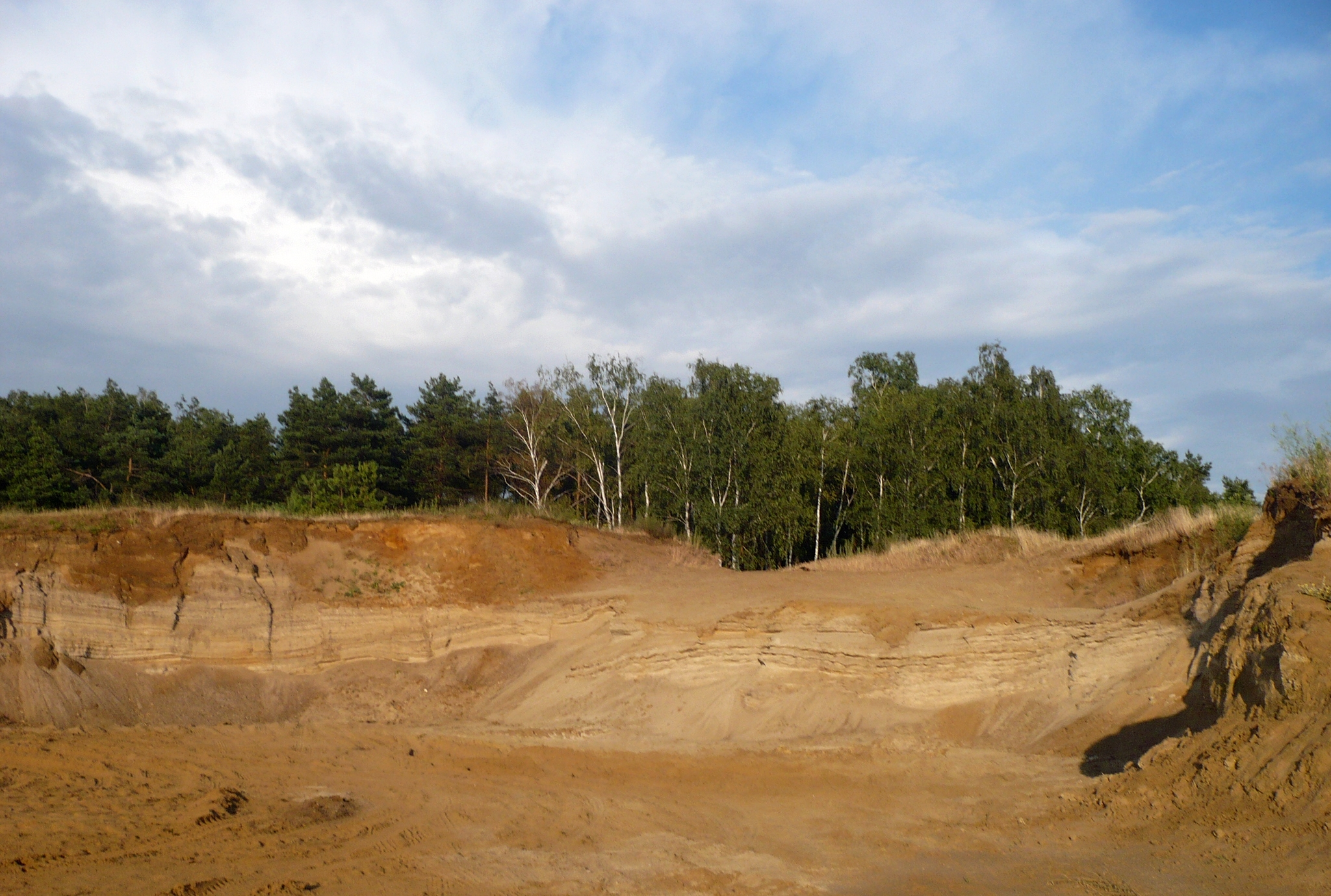

- Location within Poland
- Coordinates: 51°32′49″N 18°45′12″E
- Country: Poland
- Voivodeship: Łódź
- County: Sieradz
- Gmina: Sieradz

Bogumiłów [bɔɡuˈmiwuf] is a village in the administrative district of Gmina Sieradz, within Sieradz County, Łódź Voivodeship, in central Poland.
