= Ruda, Sieradz County =

Ruda
- Village
- Location within Poland
- Coordinates: 51°38′15″N 18°45′33″E
- Country: Poland
- Voivodeship: Łódź
- County: Sieradz
- Gmina: Sieradz

Ruda [ˈruda] is a village in the administrative district of Gmina Sieradz, within Sieradz County, Łódź Voivodeship, in central Poland.
