= Rączki, Świętokrzyskie Voivodeship =

Rączki
- Village
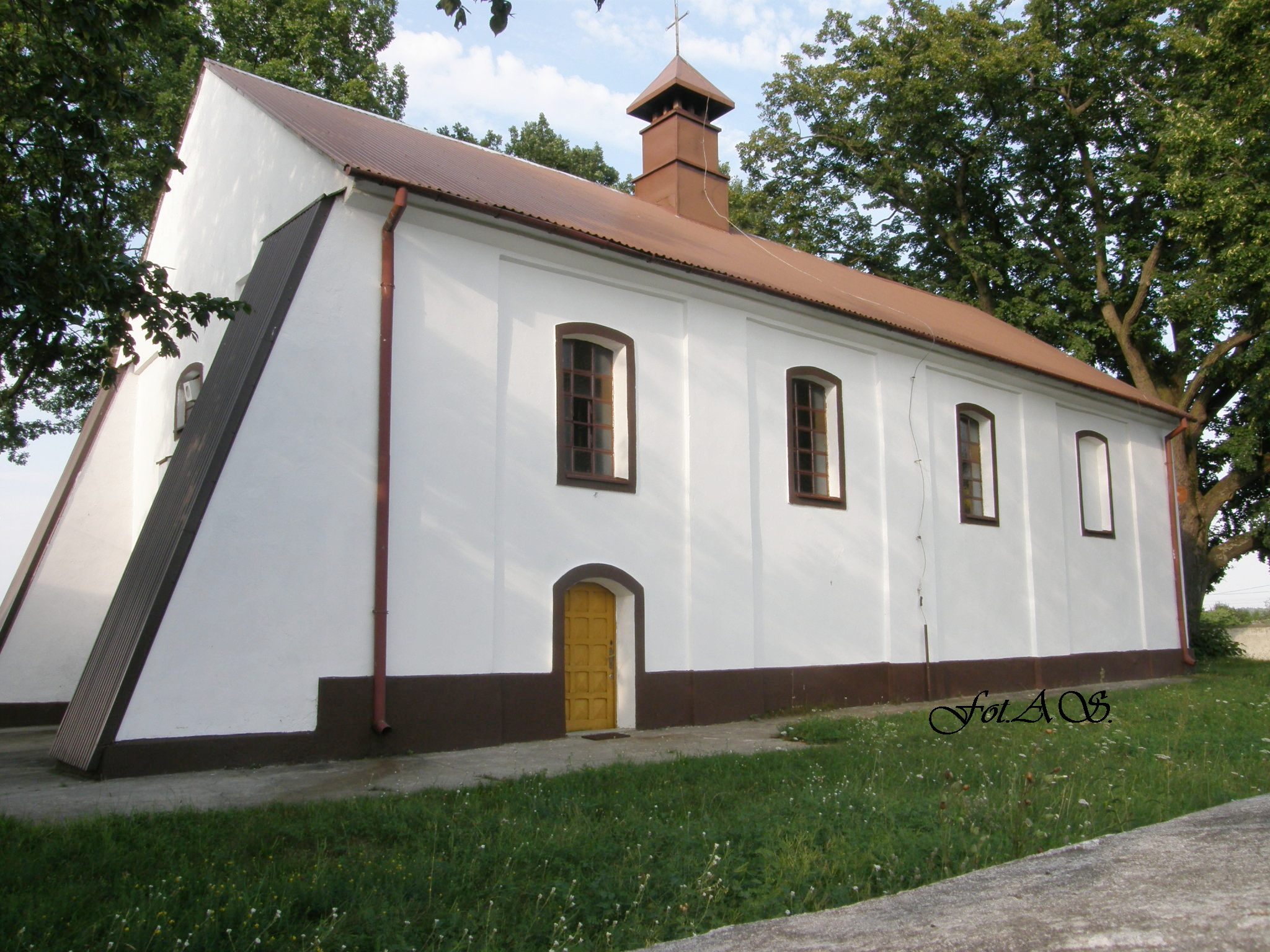
- Catholic church

- Location within Poland
- Coordinates: 51°1′14″N 19°53′53″E
- Country: Poland
- Voivodeship: Świętokrzyskie
- County: Włoszczowa
- Gmina: Kluczewsko
- Elevation: 316 m (1,037 ft)
- Population: 401

Rączki [ˈrɔnt͡ʂki] is a village in the administrative district of Gmina Kluczewsko, within Włoszczowa County, Świętokrzyskie Voivodeship, in south-central Poland. It lies approximately 11 km (7 mi) north of Kluczewsko, 20 km (12 mi) north of Włoszczowa, and 53 km (33 mi) west of the regional capital Kielce.
