= Dąbrówka, Gmina Sieradz =

Dąbrówka
- Village
- Location within Poland
- Coordinates: 51°32′38″N 18°42′35″E
- Country: Poland
- Voivodeship: Łódź
- County: Sieradz
- Gmina: Sieradz
- Population: 260

Dąbrówka [dɔmˈbrufka] is a village in the administrative district of Gmina Sieradz, within Sieradz County, Łódź Voivodeship, in central Poland.
