= Komorniki, Świętokrzyskie Voivodeship =

Komorniki
- Village
- Location within Poland
- Coordinates: 50°56′23″N 19°58′47″E
- Country: Poland
- Voivodeship: Świętokrzyskie
- County: Włoszczowa
- Gmina: Kluczewsko

Komorniki [kɔmɔrˈniki] is a village in the administrative district of Gmina Kluczewsko, within Włoszczowa County, Świętokrzyskie Voivodeship, in south-central Poland. It lies approximately 5 km (3 mi) east of Kluczewsko, 10 km (6 mi) north of Włoszczowa, and 46 km (29 mi) west of the regional capital Kielce.
