= Czartki, Gmina Sieradz =

Czartki
- Village
- Location within Poland
- Coordinates: 51°39′44″N 18°47′47″E
- Country: Poland
- Voivodeship: Łódź
- County: Sieradz
- Gmina: Sieradz

Czartki [ˈt͡ʂartki] is a village in the administrative district of Gmina Sieradz, within Sieradz County, Łódź Voivodeship, in central Poland.
