= Dąbrowa Wielka, Łódź Voivodeship =

Dąbrowa Wielka
- Village
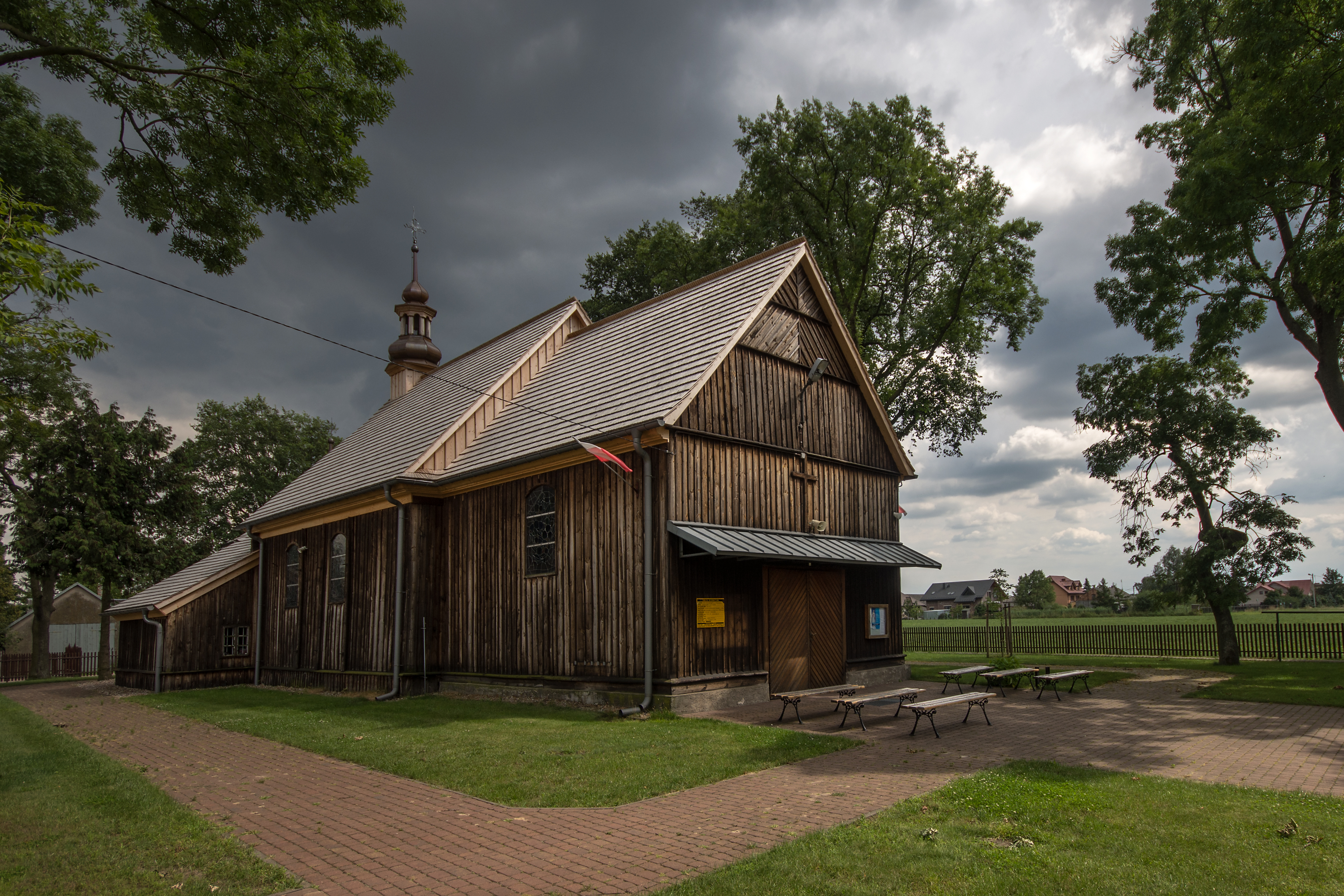
- Church of Saint Michael

- Location within Poland
- Coordinates: 51°31′42″N 18°42′58″E
- Country: Poland
- Voivodeship: Łódź
- County: Sieradz
- Gmina: Sieradz

Dąbrowa Wielka [dɔmˈbrɔva ˈvjɛlka] is a village in the administrative district of Gmina Sieradz, within Sieradz County, Łódź Voivodeship, in central Poland.
