= Chojne =

- Village
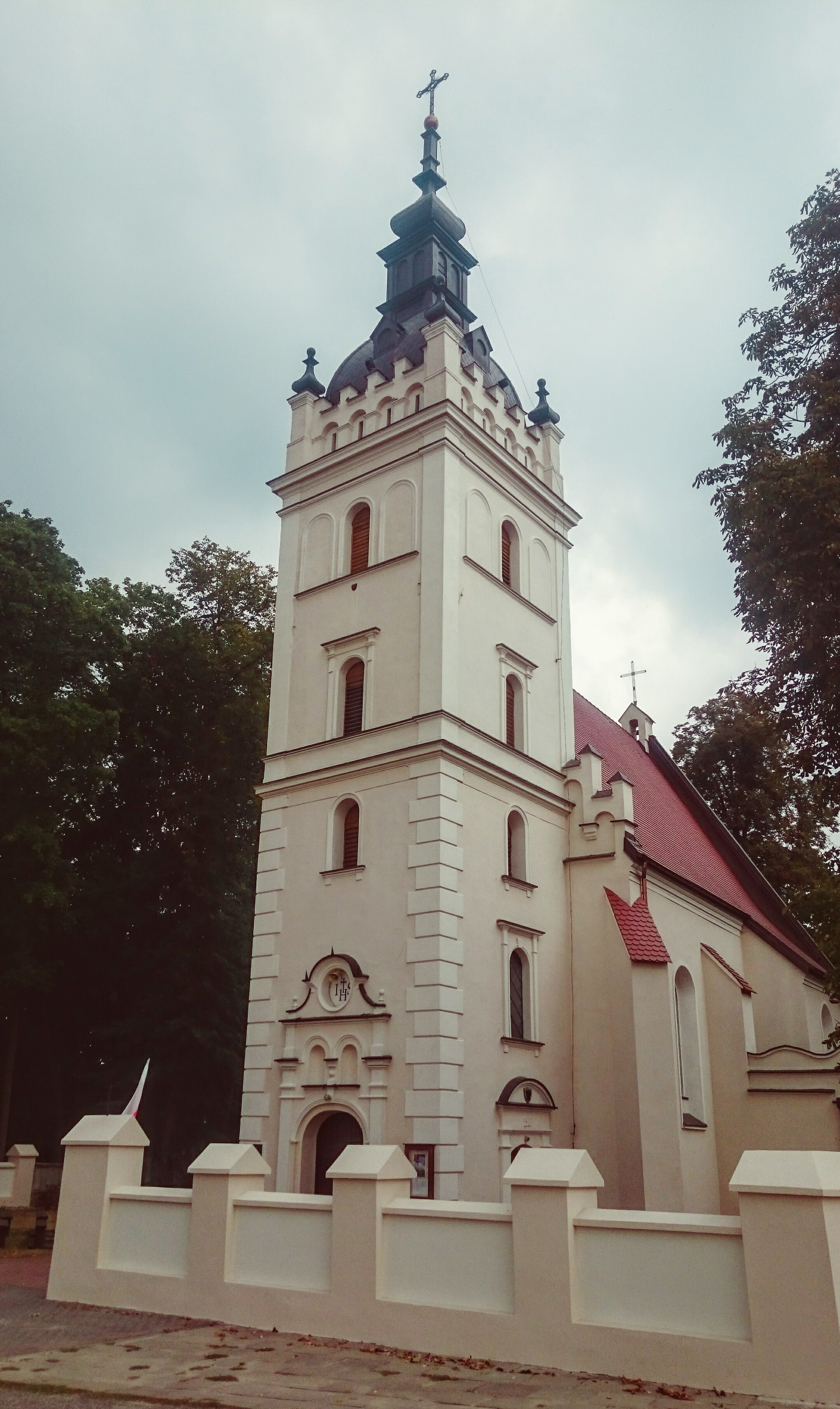
- Saint Anne church in Chojne

- Location within Poland
- Coordinates: 51°33′N 18°49′E
- Country: Poland
- Voivodeship: Łódź
- County: Sieradz
- Gmina: Sieradz
- Time zone: UTC+1 (CET)
  - Summer (DST): UTC+2 (CEST)
- Vehicle registration: ESI

Chojne [ˈxɔi̯nɛ] is a village in the administrative district of Gmina Sieradz, within Sieradz County, Łódź Voivodeship, in central Poland.

== History ==
During the German occupation of Poland in World War II, in 1940–1941, the German gendarmerie carried out expulsions of Poles, who were either sent to forced labour in the county or deported to the General Government in the more-eastern part of German-occupied Poland, while their houses and farms were handed over to German colonists.

After the war, a hoard of several coins of Kings John II Casimir Vasa and John III Sobieski from the 17th century was found in the village. The coins are part of the collection of the Archaeological and Ethnographic Museum in Łódź.
