= Rački =

Racki or Rački is a surname. It may refer to:

- Antonio Rački (born 1973), Croatian cross-country skier
- Franjo Rački (1828–1894), Croatian historian and politician
- Mirko Rački (1879–1982), Croatian painter
- Natko Rački (born 1981), Croatian football player
