= Bobrowniki, Sieradz County =

Bobrowniki
- Village
- Location within Poland
- Coordinates: 51°32′N 18°51′E
- Country: Poland
- Voivodeship: Łódź
- County: Sieradz
- Gmina: Sieradz
- Population (approx.): 220

Bobrowniki [bɔbrɔvˈniki] is a village in the administrative district of Gmina Sieradz, within Sieradz County, Łódź Voivodeship, in central Poland.

The village has an approximate population of 220.
