= Kolonia Bobrowska Wola =

- Village
- Location within Poland
- Coordinates: 50°57′31″N 19°52′28″E
- Country: Poland
- Voivodeship: Świętokrzyskie
- County: Włoszczowa
- Gmina: Kluczewsko

Kolonia Bobrowska Wola [kɔˈlɔɲa bɔˈbrɔfska ˈvɔla] is a village in the administrative district of Gmina Kluczewsko, within Włoszczowa County, Świętokrzyskie Voivodeship, in south-central Poland.
