= Borzewisko, Sieradz County =

Borzewisko
- Village
- Location within Poland
- Coordinates: 51°32′12″N 18°49′59″E
- Country: Poland
- Voivodeship: Łódź
- County: Sieradz
- Gmina: Sieradz

Borzewisko [bɔʐɛˈviskɔ] is a village in the administrative district of Gmina Sieradz, within Sieradz County, Łódź Voivodeship, in central Poland.
