= Okręglica, Łódź Voivodeship =

Okręglica
- Village
- Location within Poland
- Coordinates: 51°31′24″N 18°45′11″E
- Country: Poland
- Voivodeship: Łódź
- County: Sieradz
- Gmina: Sieradz

Okręglica [ɔkrɛŋˈɡlit͡sa] is a village in the administrative district of Gmina Sieradz, within Sieradz County, Łódź Voivodeship, in central Poland.
