= Kowale, Łódź Voivodeship =

Kowale
- Village
- Location within Poland
- Coordinates: 51°39′31″N 18°39′35″E
- Country: Poland
- Voivodeship: Łódź
- County: Sieradz
- Gmina: Sieradz

Kowale [kɔˈvalɛ] is a village in the administrative district of Gmina Sieradz, within Sieradz County, Łódź Voivodeship, in central Poland.
