= Kluczewsko =

- Village
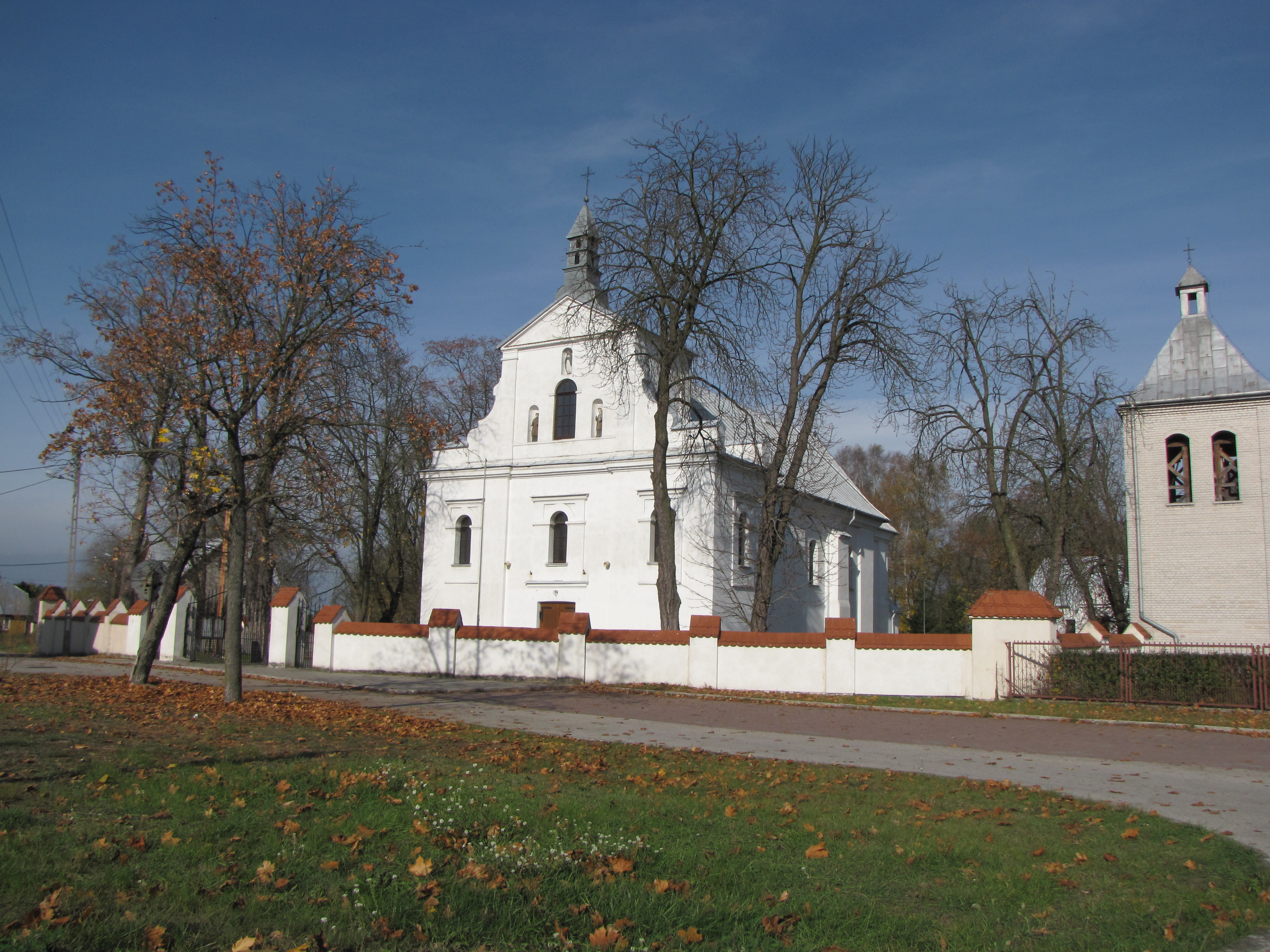
- Church of Saint Lawrence

- Coat of arms

- Location within Poland
- Coordinates: 50°55′38″N 19°55′16″E
- Country: Poland
- Voivodeship: Świętokrzyskie
- County: Włoszczowa
- Gmina: Kluczewsko

Population
  - Total: 806
- Postal code: 29-120
- Area code: +48 44
- Car plates: TLW

Kluczewsko [kluˈt͡ʂɛfskɔ] is a village in Włoszczowa County, Świętokrzyskie Voivodeship, in south-central Poland. It is the seat of the gmina (administrative district) called Gmina Kluczewsko. It lies approximately 9 km (6 mi) north of Włoszczowa and 50 km (31 mi) west of the regional capital Kielce.
