= Édouard de Reszke =

Polish bass (1853–1917)

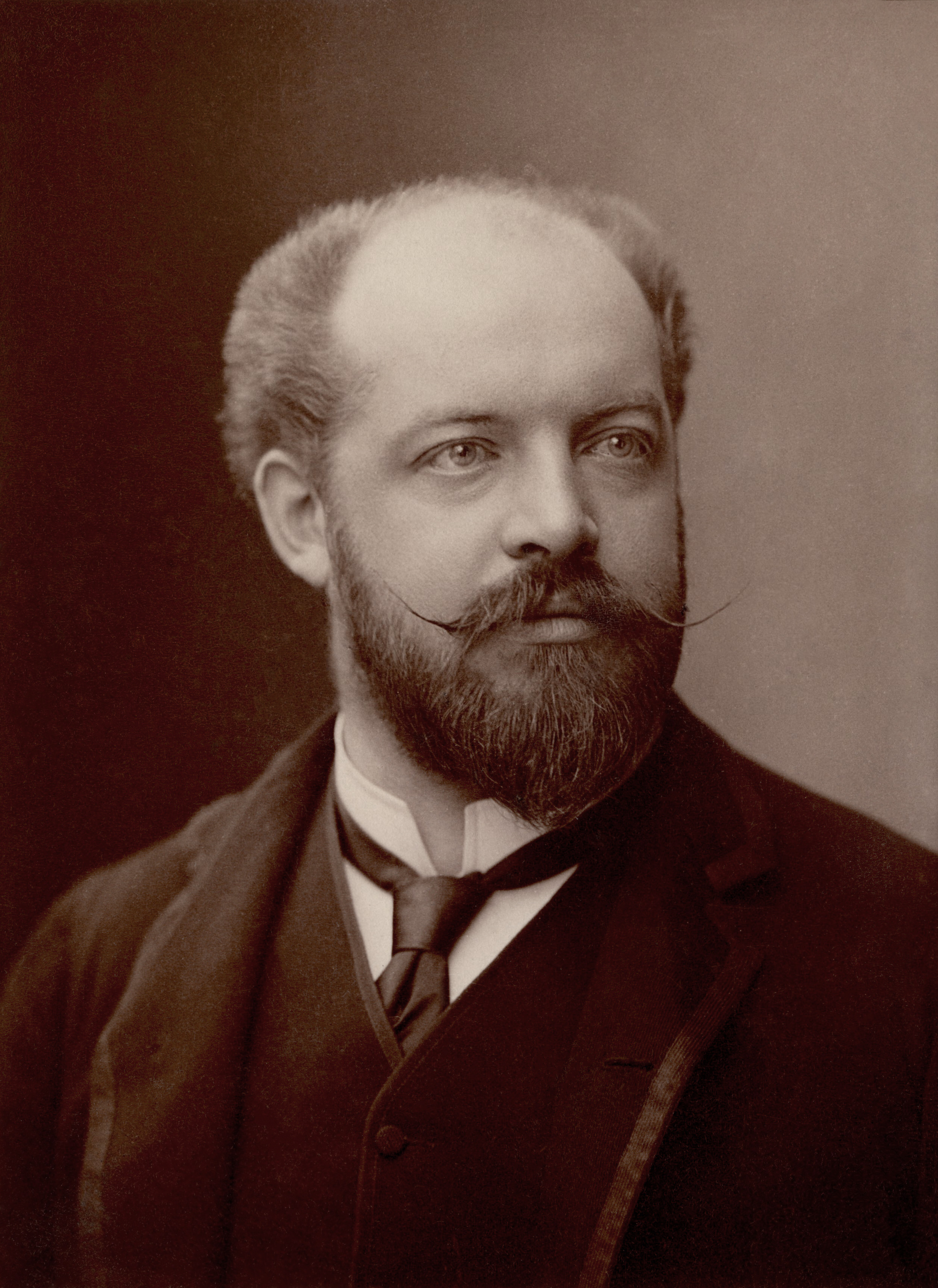
- Photograph by Nadar, c. 1900
- Born: 22 December 1853; Warsaw, Congress Poland
- Died: 25 May 1917 (aged 63); Garnek, Germany (now Poland)
- Occupation: Operatic bass
- Awards: Royal Victorian Order

Édouard de Reszke (Polish: Edward Reszke; 22 December 1853 – 25 May 1917) was a Polish bass from Warsaw. A member of the musical Reszke family, he was a successful opera singer, as were his brother Jean and his sister Josephine. He made his debut in Verdi's Aida in Paris on 22 April 1876.

Born with an impressive natural voice and equipped with compelling histrionic skills, he became one of the most illustrious opera singers active in Europe and America during the late Victorian era. He is most famous for his role as Gounod's Mephistopheles in Faust. He was also known for his roles as Mozart's Leporello, and Wagner's Sachs and Hagen. When in London, the Reszke brothers performed for Queen Victoria during gala performances at the Royal Opera House or command performances at Windsor Castle. He was awarded the Royal Victorian Order (R.V.O.) from the Queen. The Reszke brothers were entertained near London by Lady de Grey, a patron of the arts.

After he retired from the stage, he taught singing until he had significant health problems. He and his family suffered during the First World War, cut off from others, with shooting through opposite sides of the house. His health worsened during the war and he died in 1917.

== Early life ==
Édouard August Reszke was born to Jan Reszke and Emilja (also Emilie) Ufniarska on 22 December 1853. His parents operated the Hôtel de Saxe in the center of Warsaw, which catered to artists from Moscow, Berlin, and Paris. It adjoined their residence. His mother, a mezzo-soprano, had a clear, powerful voice. His father, a baritone, played the violin and wrote songs for his wife. The Reszkes held concerts on Friday nights with duets, arias and choral music. Both of his parents performed at charity events.

His siblings were Emilia, Jean (born 1850), Josephine (1855), and Victor (1859). Emilja taught her children to sing; all of whom were talented singers. At times the four oldest children, called the Reszke Quartet, performed together. Viktor was not interested in music. Josephine, Jean, and Édouard sang at a soirée in 1869.

Reszke attended an agricultural college in Germany for two years. When he returned to Warsaw, Jean noticed that his brother's voice had deepened significantly. Wanting to understand how his singing voice changed, Jean played the piano while Reszke sang, after which he told his parents that with his brother's talent, he should change his career goals and pursue an opera career. He followed his desire to sing over his parents' plan for a career in agriculture. He went to Italy and studied under Francesco Steller and later the retired baritone Filippo Coletti, who was also a friend. He studied with Giovanni Sbriglia in Paris.

By 1875, his sister Josephine was a prima donna at the Paris Opera; Reszke and his mother travelled with her. He sang at musicals as an amateur. Beginning in 1876, the Reszke brothers became known amongst Paris society and composers for their singing talent.

== Career ==
=== Stage ===
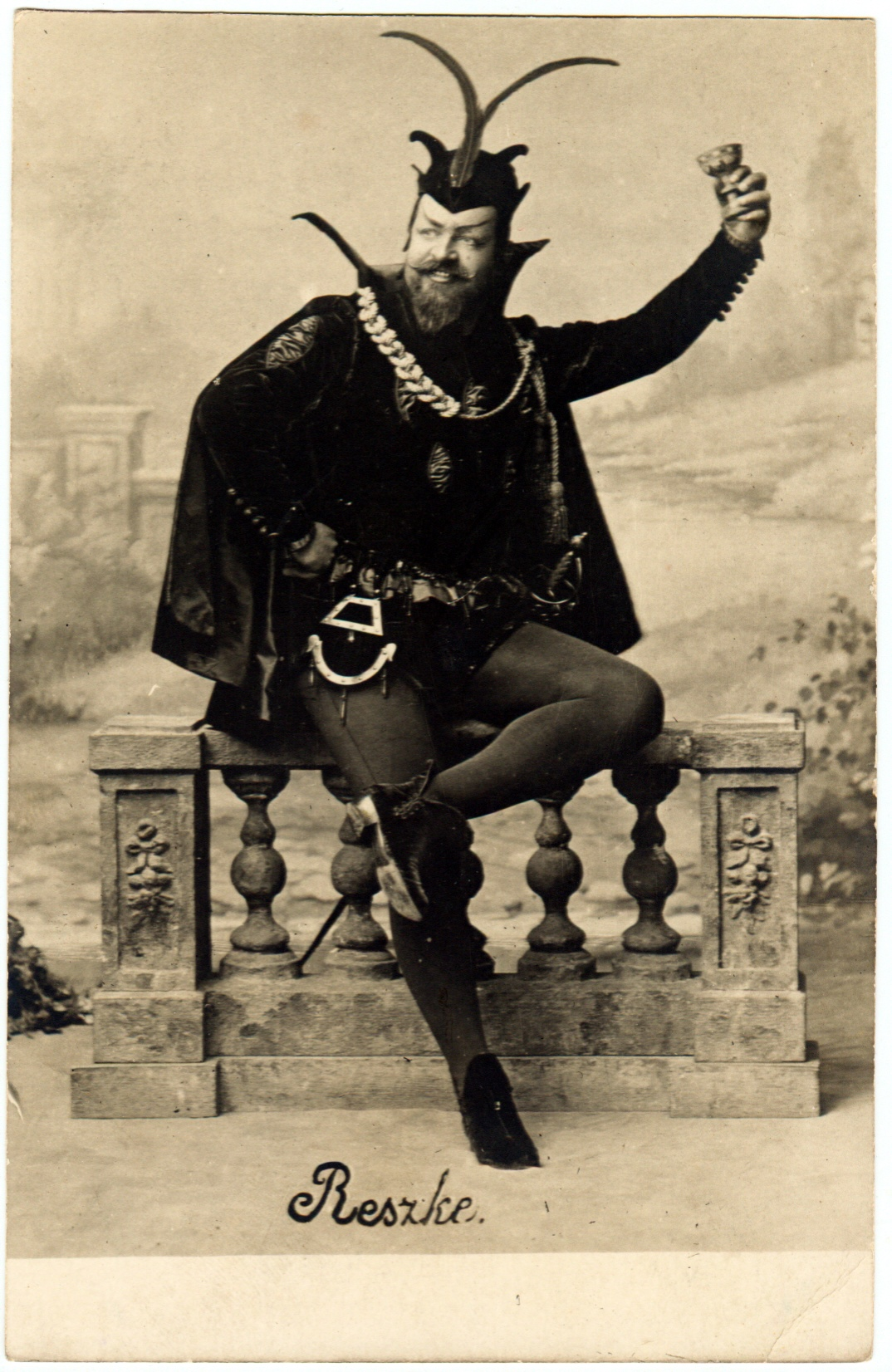
Édouard de Reszke as Mephistopheles in Gounod's Faust

Reszke debuted in Aida in Paris on 22 April 1876. He was chosen by the composer Giuseppe Verdi for the role of the King of Egypt. Fortunately, he knew the opera well, being hired just days before the performance. He was asked to grow a beard so that he looked more like a king than the young man that he was. That year, Reszke began using the French version of his surname: de Reszke. Josephine and Jean, who had careers as opera singers, changed their surname that year, too. After Aida, he performed at the Théâtre des Italiens for two seasons.

In 1879, he performed in Maria Tudor at the Teatro alla Scala and Indra in the premiere of Le roi de Lahore in Milan. The role of Ilda was created for him by Jules Massenet. He sang at Covent Garden in London in 1880. The following year, he performed in The Prodigal Son, Simon Boccanegra, and Ernani. He performed as Charles V in Don Giovanni d'Austria and the king in Elda in cities including Lisbon, Trieste, and Turin.

He performed in Italian opera at London's Royal Opera House in Covent Garden. While there, the Reszkes were often entertained at the residence of Lady de Grey, who treated the men like royalty and enjoyed their senses of humor. One night when they missed their train for London to perform at Covent Garden, a guest remembered he was the honorary president of the local fire brigade and arranged for them to be taken to London at good speed.

Reszke admired his brother, who was the leader of the two. He gladly sacrificed opportunities for a better and more independent career to perform with him once Jean had established himself as a tenor. In 1884, they appeared in Massenet's Hérodiade at the Théâtre-Italien. Later in the run, Josephine joined her brothers in the role of Salome. In Le Cid, Jean had the title role and Edouard created the role of Don Diègue. They also performed in Gounod's Roméo et Juliette and Mozart's Don Giovanni.

Reszke and his brother Jean and sister Josephine were described as a jolly trio:

Energetic, handsome, even-tempered, gifted linguists, free from the customary eccentricities of stardom, they were social favorites. The imitative faculties which Jean and Edouard had shown since childhood were generously exercised. Colleagues and friends were hilariously entertained by "take-offs" of friends and colleagues but, though the brothers enjoyed caricaturing to amuse, they never did so to wound... They loved practical jokes, but their jokes were never cruel.

In 1887, they performed in Gounod's Faust at the Paris Opéra. Reszke was best known for his role as Mephistopheles, overshadowing his brother. He was compared to Faure, a tenor who had earlier performed as the legendary demon. He excelled as Mephistopheles due to his genuine bass voice and his imposing physical presence. It was in that year he acquired the reputation of a great singer.

The brothers were at Covent Garden from 1887 to 1890. They performed in French productions of a full-length version of Faust as well as Meyerbeer's Les Huguenots with Jean Lassalle and under the impresario Augustus Harris. They added Wagner operas to their repertoire, beginning with Lohengrin and Die Meistersinger von Nürnberg , sung in Italian.

The Reszkes then performed in Warsaw and Russia. As Poles, the Reszkes were Russian citizens. During the winter of 1889–1890, they were called to a command performance by the Tsar of Russia, which made Jean nervous. The performance, and other command performances, went well for the Tsar, who ennobled the Reszkes in appreciation. More than three decades earlier, their father Jan Reszke had been exiled to Siberia in 1863 by the Russian government for his leadership role in the January Uprising; he was there five years.

They frequently performed together in the United States, beginning in Chicago then, in 1891, at New York's Metropolitan Opera. They starred with Nellie Melba in Herman Bemberg's Elaine. Maurice Grau of Abbey, Schoeffel and Grau had a formula for winning casts: the Reszke brothers, Lassalle, Plancon, and two prima donnas. According to The New York Times, that period was considered the "golden days" of art and great voices. He and his brother were among the list of well-known opera singers from Poland.

Reszke performed a wide range of roles in French, German and Italian operas, including works by Wagner, Verdi, Gounod, and Meyerbeer. In addition to Mephistopheles, he was known for the roles of Leporello, Sachs, and Hagen.

A tall, genial man, Reszke possessed a big, smooth, flexible and ripe-toned voice that matched his imposing physique and extroverted personality. He had a "full, resonant bass, capable of sending forth notes of immense volume or those of the most tender quality. His appearance was that of a broad-shouldered giant, with fair skin and blue eyes, and his stage presence was imposing".

In 1903, he retired from the stage and helped his brother teach singing in Paris, and four years later opened a singing school in London. In 1909, he closed his school in London due to recurring bouts of bronchitis and dizziness and began to teach in Warsaw until forced into retirement by health problems.

=== Queen Victoria ===
In the 25 years since Prince Albert's death, Queen Victoria did little entertaining, but in 1889 she issued a command for Emma Albani and the Reszke brothers to join her at Windsor Castle. The three performed solos and duets from L'Étoile du Nord, Lohengrin, Faust, Sweet Bird, Carmen, and La traviata. The Queen expressed her appreciation while "smiling and full of kindness". The same year, they performed a gala performance for the Shah of Persia. In 1890, after a performance of Faust at Windsor Castle, Reszke was given the Royal Victorian Order by the Queen, as was his brother fourteen months earlier.

The Queen wrote of the Reszkes in her diary:

...we had a fantastic musical feast at the dinner, which was part of a show whose task was to compensate to us the absence of Jean de Reszke in the staging of Romeo and Juliet. Jean and Edward de Reszke represented all the qualities of youthfulness. It was a gorgeous display of musical skills. The two brothers' singing was exquisite, their performance shall be memorable, so enchanting and ear-pleasing it was... The depth and powerfulness of Edward's voice were wonderful; the timbre of Jean's voice attracted with its amazing tone, worth of listening... There was no doubt that the brothers were gifted with the most eminent voices, and their singing fashion appears perfect indeed... I could be listening to this music longer still, endlessly. This is a real mastery. The voice pure and beautiful added pleasure to our soirée, and I wish it had never ended.

=== Recordings ===
External videos
- "Infelice", from Ernani
- "Chi Mi Dira" (Porter's Song) from Martha
- "Serenade" from Don Juan

Reszke made three records for commercial release that were recorded by the Columbia Phonograph Company in 1903.

Mapleson Cylinders, primitive recordings made privately during an actual performance at the Metropolitan Opera in 1901, exist. It has been released with other performances on CD by the Symposium label.

== Personal life ==
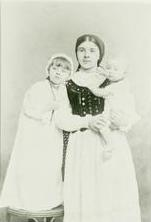
Sepia photographic print of two of Edouard de Reszke's daughters with their nurse, Lady de Grey Photographic Collection, Royal Opera House Collection

Reszke married Helene Schütze in 1885. Her brother Willie was secretary to the Reszke brothers. Her sister Félia Litvinne, born Françoise-Jeanne Schütz, sang with the men. With Helene, they had four daughters, one of whom was Minia (Emilie). She was close with both her father and her uncle Jean. When her father was to return home, she waited for him with his favorite dog. Minia considered her father to be the "most good" man she had known and was considered so by many others. Emma Eames said, "He was like a great big St. Bernard. You always wanted to pat him."

Reszke's best friend in the United States was Laura Tolman (Tolmanina), a cellist. He spent evenings with her, listening to her play her cello, beginning in the early 1890s. They saw each other until he retired from the stage and left the country. He had intended to return for a visit with her, but he never did. They continued to correspond. Among the gifts that he gave her was a St. Bernard to protect her.

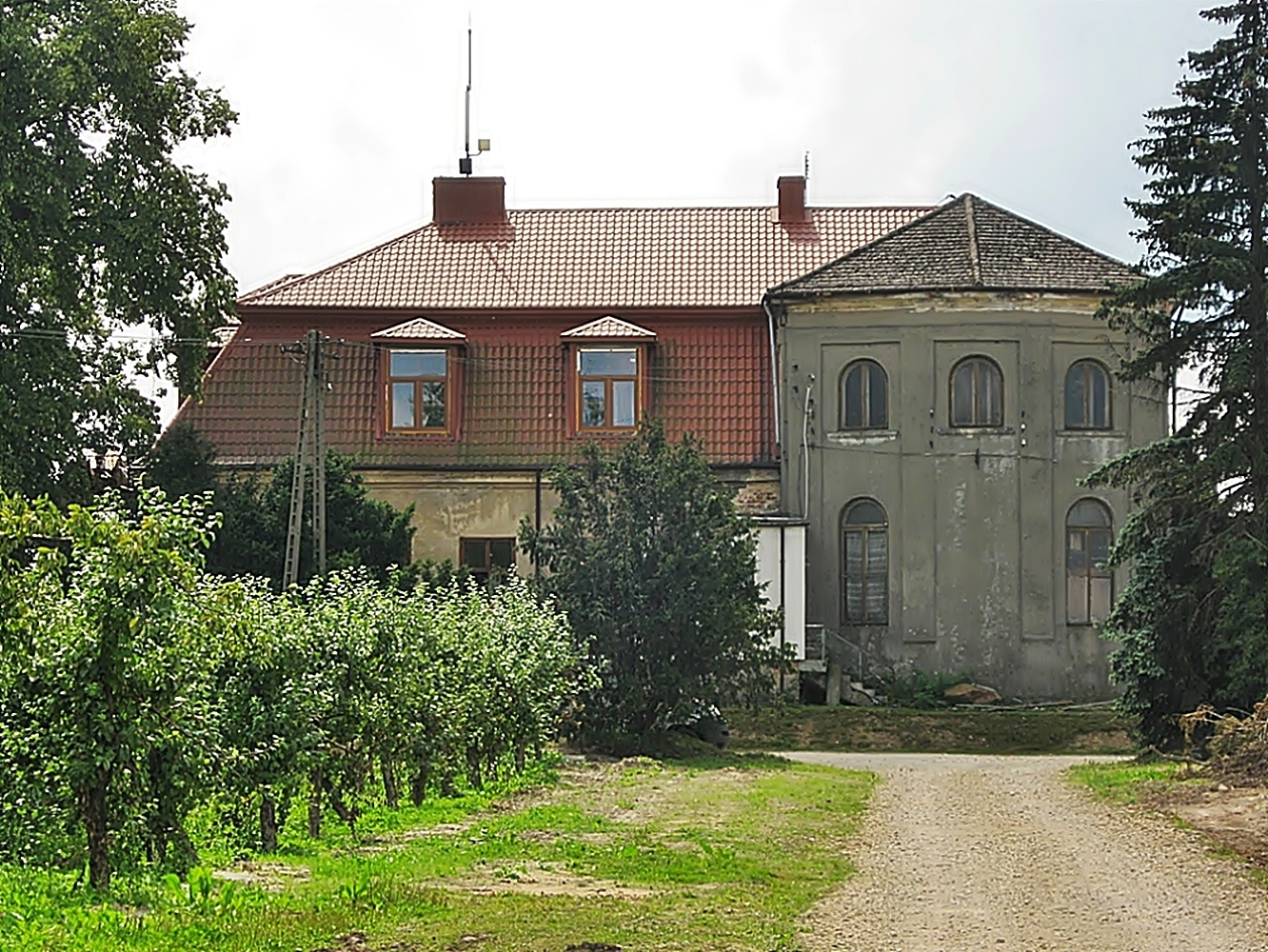
Chateau at Borowno, Poland

While they were single, the brothers spent the summers at Borowno, near Klomnice, where they owned an ancient castle or chateau of French and Russian architecture. It had been unchanged since it was rebuilt in 1791. It had a kitchen garden of several acres, was amongst thousands of acres of forest, and was the site of their first stud-farm. The stud farm and racing stable at Borowno employed about 400 local people, which was most of the residents of the village.

Reszke built a house near Garnek, Poland about 1895. It was his main residence in Poland and he owned a property named Klobukowice, which had one simple house. Jean had a manor house in Skrzydlów. It was six miles from Borowno, where he lived most of the time. He also had property at Zdrowa and Chorzenice. The Warta winds its way through the brothers' estates. Ponds and lakes on the estate were stocked with fish, including perch, trout, and carp. Deer, wild boars, turkey, and wolves lived in their forests. They farmed and raised cattle. (Note: The source says that it was the River Warra that runs through their property, but it is the Warta or River Warta.)

=== World War I ===
At the start of World War I (1914), residents of Warsaw had been told to flee the city for their safety. Children were told to cross the Alexandrian Bridge, and that they would return later. As children marched across the bridge, Reszke sang "Jescze Polska nie zginęła" (English: "Poland Is Not Yet Lost").

He retired to his estate in Poland, where he was adversely affected by the outbreak of World War I in Europe in 1914. He, his wife, and his daughters were stuck at their estate in Granek, cut off from his brother in Paris by the fighting. He had a difficult time earning money for his family and they lived in destitution during the war. At the start of the war, lines of communication were closed to them. His 12,000-acre (4,900 ha) estate called Borowno was in ruins and they lived in the cellar for one year. Princess and Prince Lubomirski, their neighbors, lived underground with them. They had little food and were generally unsuccessful at foraging for food. The Russian and German troops were on opposite sides of their house and during their conflict they shot through the house. Having run out of coal and with just a handful grain, they were cold and hungry. After the troops left the area, they were somewhat comfortable for a time, but then had to hide out in a cold cave for their protection. After that they returned home. Reszke became ill and suffered from crippling rheumatism. He became very thin and unable to lie down, so he spent his time in an armchair for a while. He was cared for by his wife and children, during which time he told funny and interesting stories about his career to lighten the mood.

Reszke died of illness on 25 May 1917 in Garnek, near Częstochowa, Poland (16 kilometres (9.9 miles) from the village of Borowno,) or at his estate in Erietrikov, Poland. He was buried at the Michalski family tomb at the Borowno estate. Daughter Minia comforted Jean after her father's death, and was with Jean when he died.

== Appearances ==
=== Royal Opera House, Covent Garden ===
His appearances at the Royal Opera House at Covent Garden include:

- 1880: Royal Italian Opera Season from 13 April to 17 July
  - as "Don Basilio" in The Barber of Seville (5, shared)
  - as "St. Bris" in Les Huguenots (3, shared)
  - as "Giorgio" in I puritani (3)
  - as "Indra" in Le roi de Lahore (3, debut at Covent Garden in this role 13 April 1880)
  - as "Count Rodolfo" in La sonnambula (5, shared)
- 1881: Royal Italian Opera Season from 19 April to 23 July
  - as "Don Basilio" in The Barber of Seville (2)
  - as "Gudal" in The Demon (4)
  - as "Walter" in Guillaume Tell (3)
  - as "St. Bris" in Les Huguenots (3)
  - as "The Prefect" in Linda di Chamounix (2)
  - as "Giorgio" in I puritani (1)
  - as "Frère Laurent" in Roméo et Juliette (2)
  - as "Count Rodolfo" in La sonnambula (2)
- 1882: Royal Italian Opera Season from 18 April to 20 July
  - as "Don Basilio" in The Barber of Seville (4)
  - as "Walter" in Guillaume Tell (2)
  - as "St. Bris" in Les Huguenots (1)
  - as "Giorgio" in I puritani (1)
  - as "Frère Laurent" in Roméo et Juliette (1)
  - as "Count Rodolfo" in La sonnambula (2)
  - as "Senon" in Velléda (3)
- 1883: Royal Italian Opera Season from 1 May to 21 July
  - as "Don Basilio" in The Barber of Seville (2)
  - as "Dalando" in The Flying Dutchman (2)
  - as "Walter" in Guillaume Tell (2)
  - as "Alvise" in La Gioconda (7)
  - as "St. Bris" in Les Huguenots (3)
  - as "Heinrich" in Lohengrin (2)
  - as "Almaviva" in The Marriage of Figaro (2)
  - as "Giorgio" in I puritani (1)
  - as "Count Rodolfo" in La sonnambula (3)
- 1884: Royal Italian Opera Season from 29 April to 26 July
  - as "Don Basilio" in The Barber of Seville (2)
  - as "Czar Peter" in L'étoile du nord (3)
  - as "Méphistophélès" in Faust (5)
  - as "Alvise" in La Gioconda (3)
  - as "St. Bris" in Les Huguenots (4)
  - as "The Prefect" in Linda di Chamounix (1)
  - as (illegible data) in Lucrezia Borgia (2)
  - as "Almaviva" in The Marriage of Figaro (4)
  - as (illegible data) in Semiramide (1)
  - as "Hagen" in Sigurd (3)
- 1888: Royal Italian Opera Season from 15 May to 21 July
  - as "Don Pedro" in L'Africaine (2)
  - as "Don Basilio" in The Barber of Seville (1)
  - as "Méphistophélès" in Faust (7, shared)
  - as "Walter" in Guillaume Tell (2)
  - as "St. Bris" in Les Huguenots (4)
  - as "Heinrich" in Lohengrin (6)
  - as "Sarastro" in The Magic Flute (1)
  - as "Mefistofele" in Mefistofele (1)
- 1889: Royal Italian Opera Season from 18 May to 27 July
  - as "Méphistophélès" in Faust (7, shared)
  - as "Walter" in Guillaume Tell (2)
  - as "St. Bris" in Les Huguenots (3)
  - as "Heinrich" in Lohengrin (6, shared)
  - as "Frère Laurent" in Roméo et Juliette (7)
  - as "Count Rodolfo" in La sonnambula (2)
- 1890: Royal Italian Opera Season from 19 May to 28 July
  - as "Méphistophélès" in Faust (6, shared)
  - as "St. Bris" in Les Huguenots (6, shared)
  - as "Heinrich" in Lohengrin (5)
  - as "Zacharie" in Le prophète (5)
  - as "Frère Laurent" in Roméo et Juliette (5)
  - as "Count Rodolfo" in La sonnambula (1)
- 1891: Royal Italian Opera Season from 6 April to 27 July
  - as "Leporello" in Don Giovanni (5, shared)
  - as "Méphistophélès" in Faust (12, shared)
  - as "St. Bris" in Les Huguenots (8)
  - as "Heinrich" in Lohengrin (9)
  - as "Plumketto" in Martha (2)
  - as "Mefistofele" in Mefistofele (2)
  - as "Zacharie" in Le Prophète (3)
  - as "Frère Laurent" in Roméo et Juliette (8, shared)
- 1892: Royal Italian Opera Season from 16 May to 28 July
  - as "Leporello" in Don Giovanni (2)
  - as "L'Eremite" in Elaine (5)
  - as "Dalando" in The Flying Dutchman (1)
  - as "St. Bris" in Les Huguenots (1)
  - as "Heinrich" in Lohengrin (5, shared)
  - as "Almaviva" in The Marriage of Figaro (2)
  - as "Zacharie" in Le prophète (1)
  - as "Frère Laurent" in Roméo et Juliette (3)
- 1893: Royal Opera Season from 15 May to 29 July
  - as "Méphistophélès" in Faust (6, shared)
  - as "Dalando" in The Flying Dutchman (2)
  - as "St. Bris" in Les Huguenots (2)
  - as "Heinrich" in Lohengrin (6, shared)
  - as "Frère Laurent" in Roméo et Juliette (7, shared)
- 1894: Royal Opera Season from 15 May to 29 July
  - as "Ramfis" in Aida (2)
  - as "L'Eremite" in Elaine (2)
  - as "Méphistophélès" in Faust (7, shared)
  - as "The Roundhead Colonel" in The Lady of Longford (2)
  - as "Heinrich" in Lohengrin (4)
  - as "Frère Laurent" in Roméo et Juliette (7)
- 1896: Royal Opera Season from 11 May to 28 July
  - as "Méphistophélès" in Faust (6, shared)
  - as "Heinrich" in Lohengrin (5, shared)
  - as "Plumketto" in Martha (2)
  - as "Mefistofele" in Mefistofele (2, shared)
  - as "Hans Sachs" in Die Meistersinger von Nürnberg (5)
  - as "Frère Laurent" in Roméo et Juliette (8, shared)
  - as "King Mark" in Tristan und Isolde (4)
- 1897: Royal Opera Season from 10 May to 28 July
  - as "Méphistophélès" in Faust (7)
  - as "Marcel" in Les Huguenots (5, shared)
  - as "Heinrich" in Lohengrin (7)
  - as "Hans Sachs" in Die Meistersinger (3)
  - as "Almaviva" in The Marriage of Figaro (2)
  - as "Frère Laurent" in Roméo et Juliette (6, shared)
  - as "Der Wanderer" in Siegfried (4)
  - as "King Mark" in Tristan und Isolde (3)
- 1898: Royal Opera Season from 9 May to 16 July
  - as "Don Basilio" in The Barber of Seville (1)
  - as "Leporello" in Don Giovanni (1)
  - as "Méphistophélès" in Faust (7, shared)
  - as "Hagen" in Götterdämmerung (3)
  - as "Heinrich" in Lohengrin (7, shared)
  - as "Hans Sachs" in Die Meistersinger (4)
  - as "Almaviva" in The Marriage of Figaro (2, shared)
  - as "King Mark" in Tristan und Isolde (4, shared)
  - as "Frère Laurent" in Roméo et Juliette (at least once)
- 1899: Royal Opera Season from 8 May to 24 July
  - as "Leporello" in Don Giovanni (3)
  - as "Méphistophélès" in Faust (8, shared)
  - as "St. Bris" in Les Huguenots (2, shared)
  - as "Heinrich" in Lohengrin (6, shared)
  - as "Frère Laurent" in Roméo et Juliette (5, shared)
  - as "King Mark" in Tristan und Isolde (4)
- 1900: Royal Opera Season from 14 May to 30 July
  - as "Don Basilio" in The Barber of Seville (1)
  - as "Leporello" in Don Giovanni (2)
  - as "Méphistophélès" in Faust (8, shared)
  - as "Marcel" in Les Huguenots (2)
  - as "Heinrich" in Lohengrin (6, shared)
  - as "Frère Laurent" in Roméo et Juliette (5, shared)
  - as "Ramfis" in Aida (at least once)

=== Gala and command performances ===
Gala and command performances by Jean and Édouard de Reszke at Covent Garden and Command Performances at Windsor Castle:

- 2 July 1889: Gala in honour of the Shah of Persia:
  - Éduoard as "Mephistofele" in Act I of Mefistofele and as "Mefistofele" in Act 4 of Faust
  - Jean as "Faust" in Act 4 of Faust
- 8 July 1891: Visit of the Emperor and Empress of Germany
  - Éduoard as "Enrico" in Act 1 of Lohengrin, as "Laurent" in Act 4 of Roméo et Juliette and as "San Bris" in Act 4 of Les Huguenots
  - Jean as "Lohengrin" in Act 1 of Lohengrin, as "Romeo" in Act 4 of Roméo et Juliette and as "Raoul" in Act 4 of Les Huguenots
- 4 July 1893: Gala in honour of the marriage of the Duke of York and Princess Mary of Teck
  - Éduoard as "Laurent" in Roméo et Juliette
  - Jean as "Romeo" in Roméo et Juliette
- 23 June 1897: 60th Anniversary of Queen Victoria's accession
  - Éduoard as "Laurent" in Act 3 of Roméo et Juliette
  - Jean as "Romeo" in Act 3 of Roméo et Juliette
- 27 June 1898: Command Performance at Windsor Castle (no data on programme)
- 24 May 1899: Command Performance at Windsor Castle
  - Éduoard as "Enrico" in Lohengrin
  - Jean as "Lohengrin" in Lohengrin
- 16 July 1900: Command Performance at Windsor Castle
  - Éduoard as "Mefistofele" in Faust

== Sources ==
- Leiser, Clara (1934). Jean de Reszke and the Great Days of Opera. Minton, Balch & Company.
- Małolepsza, Agata (2010). Działalność artystyczna i ziemiańska rodu Reszke na przełomie XIX i XX wieku ['The artistic and landed-gentry activities of the Reszke family in the late 19th/early 20th century']. Novae Res – Wydawnictwo Innowacyjne [Gdynia].
