= Josephine de Reszke =

Polish operatic soprano (1855–1891)

- Józefina Reszke
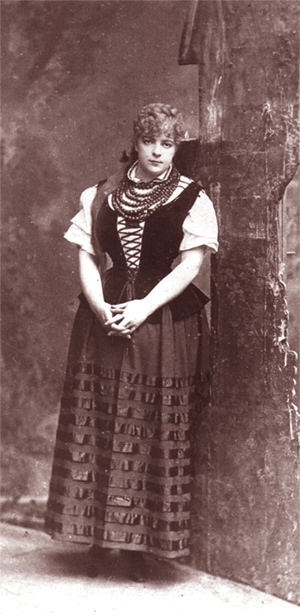
- Born: 4 June 1855
- Died: 22 February 1891 (aged 35); Warsaw, Poland
- Occupation: dramatic soprano
- Spouse: Leopold Julian Kronenberg
- Parents: Jan Reszke (father); Emilja Ufniarska (mother)

Joséphine de Reszke (née Józefina Reszke; 4 June 1855 – 22 February 1891) was a Polish operatic dramatic soprano. She and her brothers, Jean and Édouard de Reszke, learned to sing from their mother Emilja. Josephine also had lessons with Mme. Nissen-Salomon. She made her debut in Venice as Cecilia in Gomes' Il Guarany in 1874 as Giuseppina di Reschi, an Italianate spelling of her name.

She performed in Western Europe. She was with the Paris Opera for several years, during which time she became known for her performances in Italian and French operas. She retired from the stage after she married Baron Leopold Julian Kronenberg, yet she stayed in the arena as a voice teacher.

== Early years ==
Reske was the daughter of Emilja (also Emilie) Ufniarska (born c. 1827) and Jan Reszke. Emilja was an amateur soprano who had studied under Manuel García II and Pauline Viardot, his sister. She had a clear, powerful voice. She traveled throughout Italy and attended performances by the great masters of the opera. In Warsaw, she performed the role of Desdemona in William Shakespeare's Otello by Gioachino Rossini at an event for the Benevolent Society at the Grand Theatre.

The Reszkes built and operated the Hotel Saski, which catered to artists from Moscow, Berlin, and Paris, adjoined their residence. Impromptu performances with Emilja, as well as artist's rehearsals for upcoming performances, were held in their house.

Her siblings were Jean and Édouard de Reszke. Emilja taught her children to sing. and Josephine also studied with a Mme. Nissen-Salomon. She studied music at the Conservatorium in St. Petersburg. Josephine, Jean, and Édouard performed at a soirée in 1869.

== Career ==
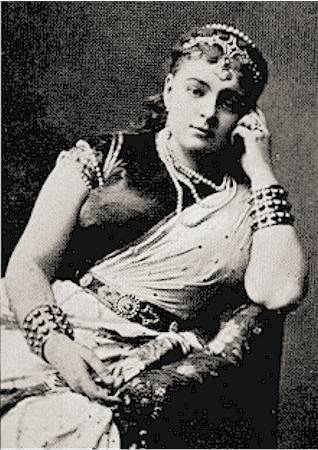
Josephine de Reszke as Sitâ in Le roi de Lahore by Jules Massenet

Josephine made her professional debut in 1874 in Venice, as Cecilia in a new production of Gomes' Il Guarany opposite Francesco Tamagno as Pery. Her Paris debut came on June 21, 1875 as Ophelia in Thomas' Hamlet. She and her younger brother Édouard de Reszke performed in Western Europe beginning in the 1870s. Jean sang soprano solos as a boy in Warsaw Cathedral. Édouard, a bass, debuted in Aida in Paris in April 1876.

She remained at the Opéra in Paris, France for several years, during which time she became known for her performances in Italian and French operas; she also created the role of Sita in Jules Massenet's Le roi de Lahore. She was a success in Madrid, Spain in Les Huguenots, L'Africaine, La favorite, and Don Giovanni. She also performed in Lisbon, Portugal but turned down an offer to appear in the United States. She remained in Europe—including Italy and Great Britain—for the duration of her career.

Reszke debuted in England on 18 April 1881 at Covent Garden where she played the title role in Aida and her brother Édouard was also a performer.

Reszke appeared with her brother Jean on the occasion of his debut; the two, along with Edouard, participated in the Paris premiere of Hérodiade in 1884. Josephine played Salome and Jean was John the Baptist.

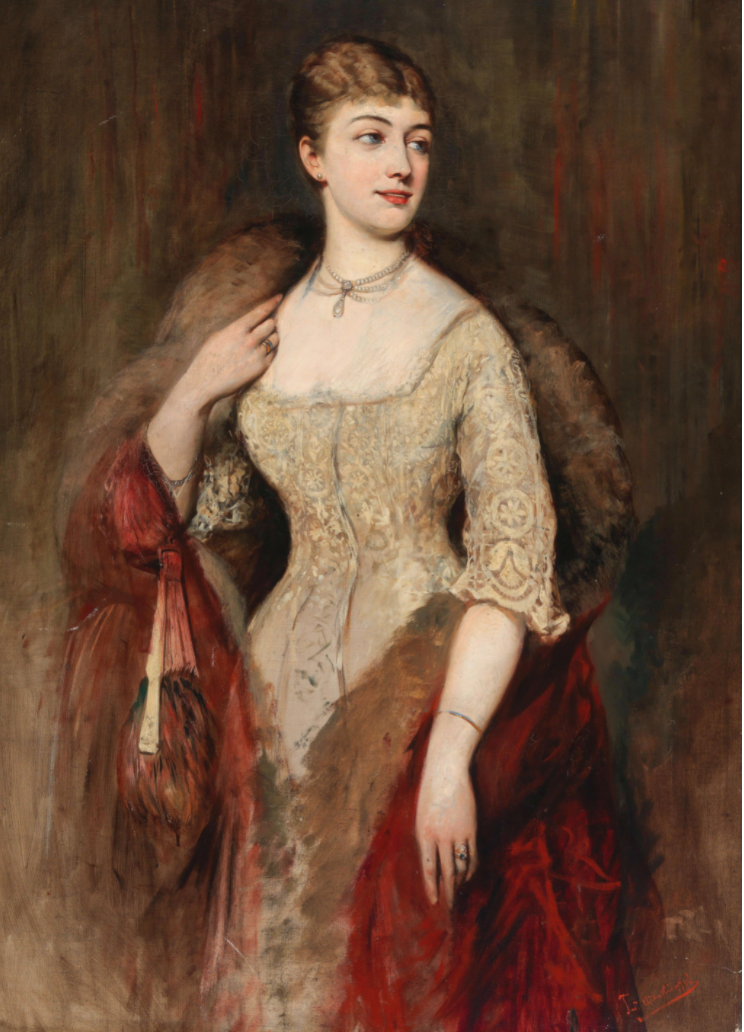
Tadeusz Ajdukiewicz, Portrait of a society lady, Josephine de Reszke, oil painting, 1879

At the end of the opera seasons, Josephine returned to Warsaw where she performed for charities, as her mother had. She gave any income that she made in Poland to charity. She became the darling of established poets and composers who dedicated poems and songs to her. Audience members gave her flowers and honored her by singing the Poland national anthem, Jescze Polska nie zginęła (English: Poland Is Not Yet Lost) to her. Fans from Krakow had a portrait of her painted by Tadeusz Ajdukiewicz and placed in the National Museum, Warsaw. (Note: The portrait was commissioned by her fans and placed in the collection of the National Museum, Warsaw. After she was married her husband Baron Krokenberg traded a painting from his collection for this painting, which was passed down through family members in 1892.)

She retired from the stage after her marriage, and she was then a voice teacher.

== Personal life ==
In 1885, she was married to Baron Leopold Julian Kronenberg. At the peak of her career, she retired from the stage almost completely, giving only charity performances thereafter. For this she was awarded with a diamond from the city of Poznań.

== Death ==
She died in Warsaw in 1891, aged 35.

== Sources ==
- Ewen, David (1963). Encyclopedia of the Opera (New enlarged ed.). New York: Hill and Wang.
- Klein, Herman (1925). "Jean de Reszke and Marie Brema: Some Reminiscences". The Musical Times. 66 (987): 405–408. doi:10.2307/912989. ISSN 0027-4666. JSTOR 912989.
- Leiser, Clara (1934). Jean de Reszke and the Great Days of Opera. Minton, Balch & Company.
