= Jean de Reszke =

Polish opera singer (1850–1925)

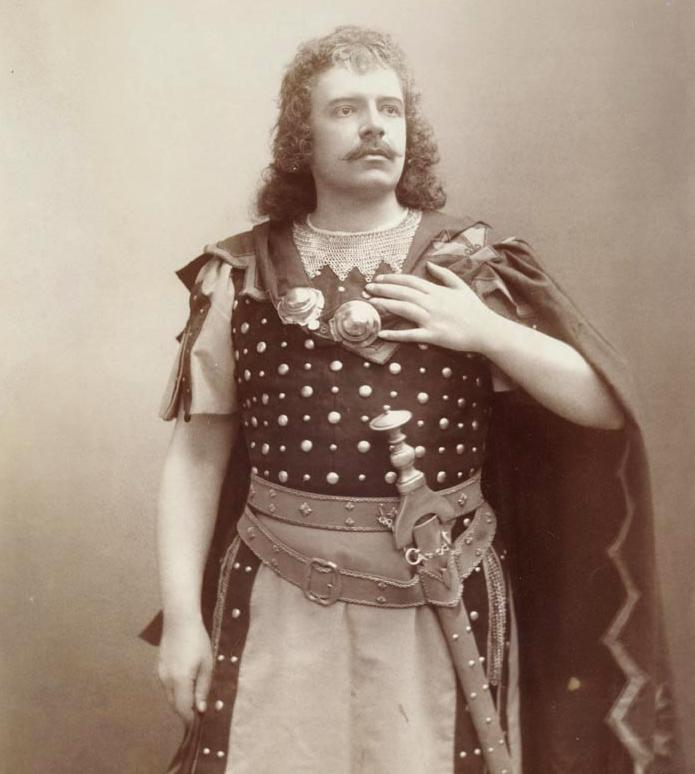
- Born: Jan Mieczysław Reszke; 14 January 1850; Warsaw, Poland
- Died: 3 April 1925 (aged 75); Nice, France
- Occupation: Tenor
- Years active: 1874–1904

Jean de Reszke (born Jan Mieczysław Reszke; 14 January 1850 – 3 April 1925) was a Polish dramatic tenor and opera star. Reszke came from a wealthy Polish family with classical and operatic musical traditions. His mother gave him his first singing lessons and provided a home that was a recognized music centre. His sister Josephine and younger brother Édouard performed in Western Europe, and Reszke would perform with each of them throughout his career.

He began as a baritone, but after having been trained by Giovanni Sbriglia he found that he was better suited and was most proficient as a tenor. His performance as John the Baptist in Massenet's Hérodiade in Paris in 1883 made him a notable singer. Reszke ranked as the world's leading tenor from that point until his retirement from the stage in 1902. He performed at opera houses in Paris, London, and New York among other places, including command performances for Queen Victoria. He was known for his desire to perform operas in the language in which they were written. Rather than taking the time-honored interpretation of the music and the characters, he brought a fresh and fuller perspective that impressed the audience, impresarios, and conductors. Music critic Camille Bellaigue said that he "gave to every word the fullness of its meaning and to every note the perfection of sound."

After suffering from a respiratory illnesses that affected his performances, he retired from the stage just after the turn of the 20th century. He was then a renowned vocal teacher and a horse breeder.

== Early years ==
Jan Mieczysław Reszke was born into a prosperous family with operatic and classical music traditions in Warsaw, Congress Poland, in 1850. (Note: His godfather was Wladyslaw Unifiaski, Lieutenant of the Artillery of the Troops for the Czar of Russia.) Both his parents were Poles; his father, Jan Reszke was a Polish state official and railroad controller and his mother, Emiljia, an amateur mezzo-soprano. Their household was a recognized musical centre.

His mother, Emiljia Ufniarska, first taught him to sing. She was a soprano who had studied under Manuel García and Pauline Viardot, his daughter. He sang with his siblings Josephine and Édouard at a soirée in 1869 and he sang soprano solos as a boy in Warsaw Cathedral. Édouard, a bass, debuted in Aida in Paris in April 1876.

Reszke studied law at the city's university, but after a few years he abandoned his legal schooling to study singing. He initially trained as a baritone under Francesco Ciaffei at the Warsaw Conservatoire, followed by lessons with Antonio Cotogni in Italy.

== Becoming a tenor ==
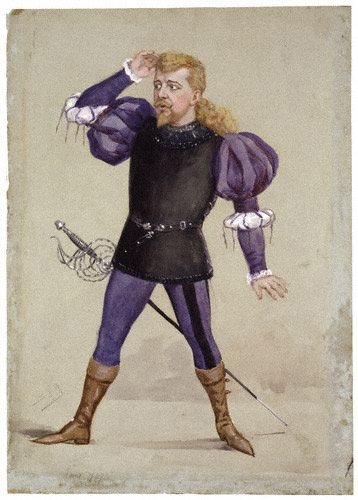
Leslie Ward, Caricature of Jean de Reszke, watercolour, published in Vanity Fair, 8 August 1891

In January 1874, Reszke made his debut in Venice undertaking the baritone part of Alfonso in a production of Donizetti's La favorite. To appeal to his audience, he was billed as Giovanni de Reschi, an Italianised version of his name. He sang opposite his sister Josephine at Teatro Malibran. In April 1874, he sang for the first time in London, performing at the Theatre Royal, Drury Lane, and on 11 October 1876 in Paris in La forza del Destino. His name was established or billed correctly as Jean de Reszke beginning with this Paris performance. He performed in other operas as a baritone, such as Figaro in The Barber of Seville and Valentin in Faust. His voice was compared to that of Enrico Caruso.

Reszke displayed limitations as a baritone and his voice had matured so that the "high notes became rounder and easier". He withdrew from the stage to allow for a further period of study, this time in Paris under Giovanni Sbriglia. His voice gained remarkably in the freedom of its upper register under Sbriglia. Reszke traveled with his sister Josephine, a soprano, and his younger brother Édouard as they performed in Western Europe, during which he took of note what performer's skills he wished to emulate and what traits he wished to avoid.

He made his reappearance in 1879 as a tenor in Madrid in the title-role of Meyerbeer's Robert le diable. The performance was not a huge success and for the next five years he would only sing in concert. In 1884, composer Jules Massenet and famous baritone Victor Maurel persuaded him to sing the role of John the Baptist in Massenet's Hérodiade. Reluctantly, he obliged and sang the role opposite his sister, Josephine, as Salomé. Despite suffering a nervous breakdown before the performance and having to be physically restrained by his brother, Edouard, and Maurel, his performance was a sensation; turning the then 34 year-old De Reszke into an overnight celebrity.

== Fame ==
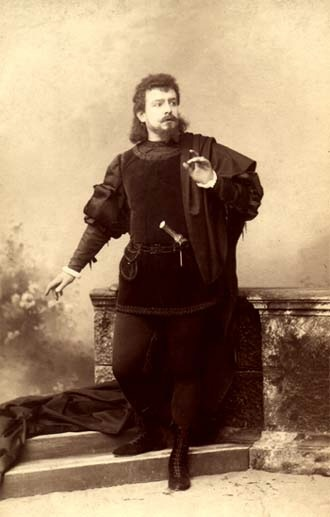
Jean de Reszke as Roméo in the opera Roméo et Juliette by French composer Charles Gounod. This was one of his signature roles.

=== Performances ===
Reszke ranked as the foremost dramatic tenor until his retirement from the stage. He sang regularly at the Paris Opera during the ensuing years of his vocal prime. After his 1884 Hérodiade , he secured a five-year contract with Paris Opera from 1885 through 1890. During that period, he performed as Rodrique in Le Cid, which Jules Massenet had written for him; as Roméo in Roméo et Juliette by Gounod, as Radamés In Verdi's Aida, the title role in Faust, Jean de Leyde in Meyerbeer's Le prophète, and Vasco de Gama in L'Africaine by the same composer.

Jean and his brother Édouard performed together at Covent Garden in London from 1887 to 1890. In 1887, Reszke was re-engaged by the management at London's Drury Lane, delivering among other things a notable Radamès in Verdi's Aida. The following year he was heard again in London, appearing no longer at Drury Lane but at the Royal Opera House, Covent Garden. Reszke's Covent Garden appearances in 1888 proved exceedingly popular with audiences. Indeed, they were mainly responsible for the revival of the operatic art form as a fashionable amusement in London. Reszke would sing in the British capital nearly every year until 1900. British critics stated that he was the greatest tenor since Mario.

The Reszke's performed in Warsaw and Russia. From Poland, the Reszkes were Russian citizens. During the winter of 1889–1890, they were called to a command performance by the Tsar of Russia, which made Jean nervous. The performance, and other command performances, went well for the Tsar, who ennobled the Reszkes in appreciation. Jean was the only performer to dine with the Tsar at his own table. More than three decades earlier, their father Jan Reszke was exiled to Siberia in 1863 by the Russian government for his leadership role in the January Uprising; he was there five years.

In 1891, Reszke sang in the United States for the first time. He and his brother continued to frequently perform together. They starred with Nellie Melba in Elaine by Bemberg. From 1893 to 1899 he starred in every season at the Metropolitan Opera House in New York City. Maurice Grau of Abbey, Schoeffel and Grau had a formula for winning casts: the de Reszke brothers, Lassalle, Plancon, and two prima donnas. According to The New York Times, that period was considered the "golden days" of art and great voices.

Over the course of his career, he mastered a number of roles. Including, but not limited to: Vasco da Gama in L'Africaine and Raoul in Les Huguenots (both by Meyerbeer), Faust in Faust (by Gounod), Lohengrin in Lohengrin (by Wagner), Siegfried, and Wagner's Tristan in Tristan und Isolde. By making these roles his own, he pushed aside the time-worn faute de mieux and brought a fresh understanding of the characters. Herman Klein, an English music critic, described his Raoul as "superb", his Faust was "unsurpassable" and that he was "an ideal Lohengrin".

The Australian lyric soprano Nellie Melba performed with Jean and Édouard and was a close personal friend. He performed in the United States until 1901.

In 1902, he retired from the stage as Canio in the French premiere of Pagliacci by Ruggero Leoncavallo at the Paris Opera.

=== Expertise ===
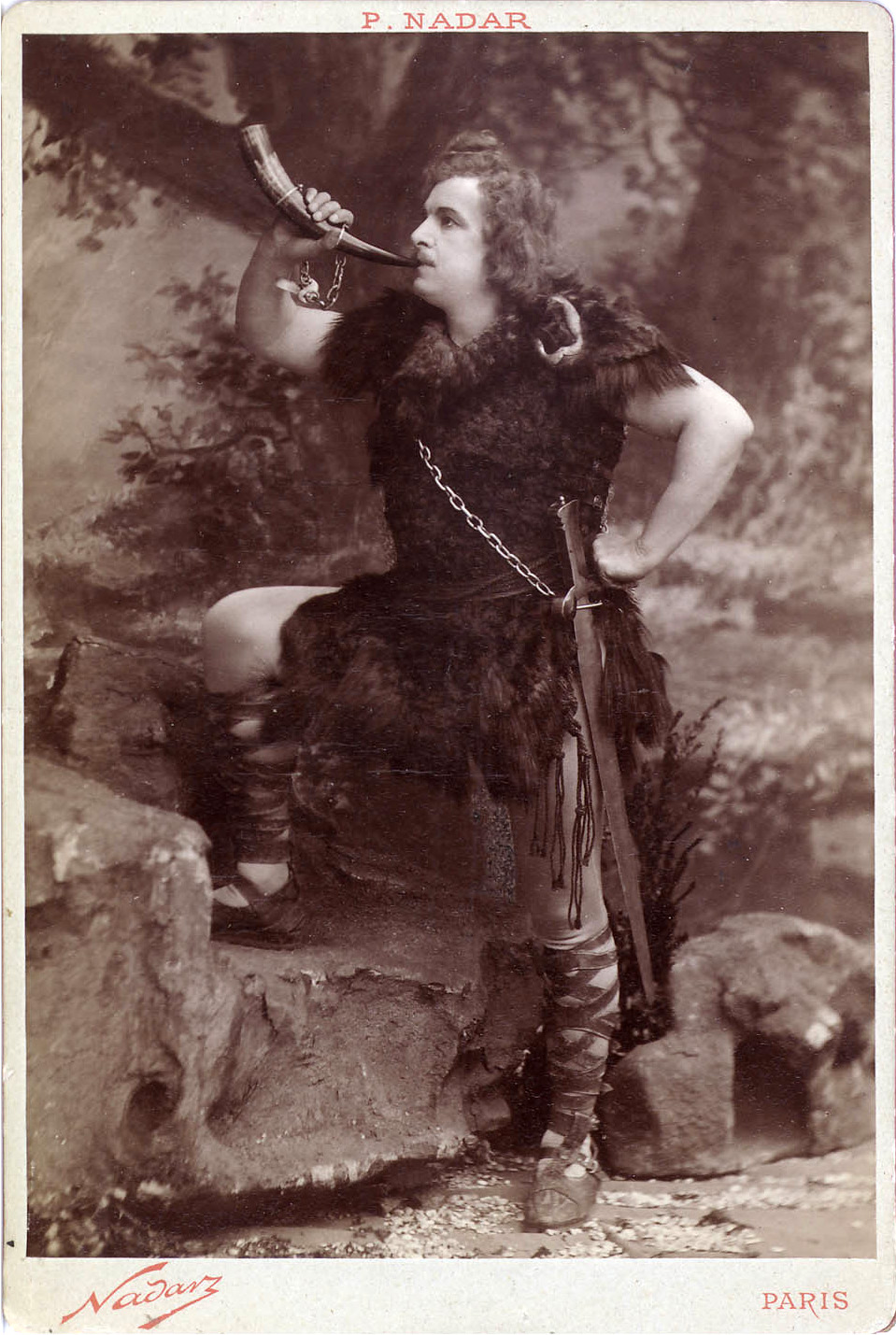
Jean de Reszke in the title role of Wagner's Siegfried, c. 1896, photograph by Nadar, MetOpera database

Reszke spoke German, French, Italian, Russian, Polish, and English. He was adept at translating the styles of the different operatic traditions: "From the Italian one learned the legato line and the control that comes from agility, the French school gave charm and sobriety, while the German method taught energy of diction, the violence required in certain dramatic situations and a particular poetic vehemence, or exuberance..."

At Covent Garden, operas were performed in Italian traditionally. Reszke was the first to sing Wagner in German at the Covent Garden in the 1895–1896 season. He saw the composer's works as something sacred and brought intensity, skill, and charisma to his performances. Rather than following the interpretations of the music by the conductor, Reszke relied on his understanding about how a work should be performed. Some conductors were reticent to take his suggestions, while other conductors and impresarios were in awe of him. His bel canto performances, based upon his understanding of Wagner's works, provided a deeper meaning of the compositions. Music critic Camille Bellaigue stated that he "gave to every word the fullness of its meaning and to every note the perfection of sound."

During his heyday, Reszke sang Italian operas less frequently than French or Wagnerian ones. Indeed, in 1891, his keenly awaited interpretation of the title role in Verdi's last tragic masterpiece, Otello, had disappointed the critics somewhat; while expertly sung and played, it lacked the clarion ring and elemental force that his main tenor rival, Francesco Tamagno (1850–1905), had brought to the part. On this occasion Shaw also chided him for his laziness and his customary lateness in meeting cues.

=== Queen Victoria ===
Reszke's singing was admired by Queen Victoria, and between 1889 and 1900 he was invited to take part in a number of royal galas mounted at Covent Garden and command performances held privately at Windsor Castle. She invited Jean and Édouard to Windsor Castle after the premiere of Wagner's Die Meistersinger von Nürnberg. With soprano Emma Albani, they gave the Queen an improvised concert. They remained her friends of the Queen from that point forward, and were also friends of Prince of Wales Albert Edward, later King Edward VII. On 24 May 1899, Reszke performed Lohengrin for the Queen's eightieth birthday. After the performance, he was awarded the Royal Victorian Order (R.V.O) cross (fourth class).

=== Vocal teacher ===
In 1902, after a respiratory illness forced him to retire, and he began teaching singing in Paris. (Note: He was also said to have retired in 1902, but he performed in the United States until 1903.) He also taught in Nice. In 1906, he established a vocal academy in Paris (later Webber Douglas Academy of Dramatic Art). He was one of the most highly reputed and well-paid vocal teachers in Europe. The Musical Times stated that he brought the same devotion and skill that made him a successful singer to his role as a teacher.

His pupils came from a variety of countries; most of them came from English-speaking countries. He once said that in gratitude to the success that he found in the United States, many of his students were from America. Just a few of his American students were Maggie Teyte, Oscar Seagle, Richard Bonelli, Natalie Townsend, E. Azalia Hackley, and Esther Mundell. The already well established Austrian tenor Leo Slezak also took lessons from De Reszke in 1908–1909, seeking advice on how to further improve his vocal technique.

== Personal life and health ==
Reszke married Maria de Mailly-Nesle, a French countess. She was born Maria de Goulaine, and was first married to Count Mailly-Nesle. She was an amateur musician, a linguist and a student of Gounod. She translated Wagner works from German to French for Reszke and his brother. The Reszkes had a son Jean de Reszke Jr. who died during the Battle of Clermont on the French front during World War I. He was their only child.

Throughout his career, Reszke was subject to bouts of flu and painful and anxiety-producing bronchial infections. While in the United States in his later years, Reszke had an operation to remove a growth from his vocal cords. His health problems affected his performances. Beginning in 1902, he no longer performed on the stage and split his time breeding racehorses in Poland and teaching singing.

He had the Villa Vergenere in Nice, a house in Paris, and in Poland, a manor house in Skrzydlów. In Poland, the Reszke's had large estates of 10,000 acres with 400 workers who lived there. His wife Maria preferred to live in Paris, where Reszke operated a singing school after his retirement. He last lived at Skrzydlów in 1913 and did not leave France after his son's death.

Reszke died on 3 April 1925 at his villa in Nice, having contracted bronchial influenza which brought on heart disease. He was aged 75. He left his estates in Poland to his sisters Emilia and Josephine, as well as Édouard's daughters.

Oscar Seagle, the American baritone who studied under and then taught with Reszke said of his passing:

I have lost my closest and most intimate artist friend. De Reszke was the greatest interpreter of the drama of opera I have ever known. As a tenor there is no one who has outranked him in his great roles, and only Chaliapin, who is a basso, can even parallel him.

With the conclusion of his stage career – and it must be remembered that de Reszke quit the operatic stage while still in possession of all that was best of his voice – he took up instruction. No one in all the world enjoyed so highly the confidence of producers and impresarios as did he. His judgment was practically infallible and his methods of instruction were the best, in every way, that I have ever known.

=== De Reszke cigarettes ===
Reszke enjoyed smoking cigars, but found that doing so affected his singing. He tried a number of cigarettes, but found that they were problematic too. Jacob Millhoff, a Russian cigarette manufacturer and fan who settled in London, developed a tobacco that supposedly would not damage his voice. Out of gratitude, Reszke allowed for them to be marketed under his name.

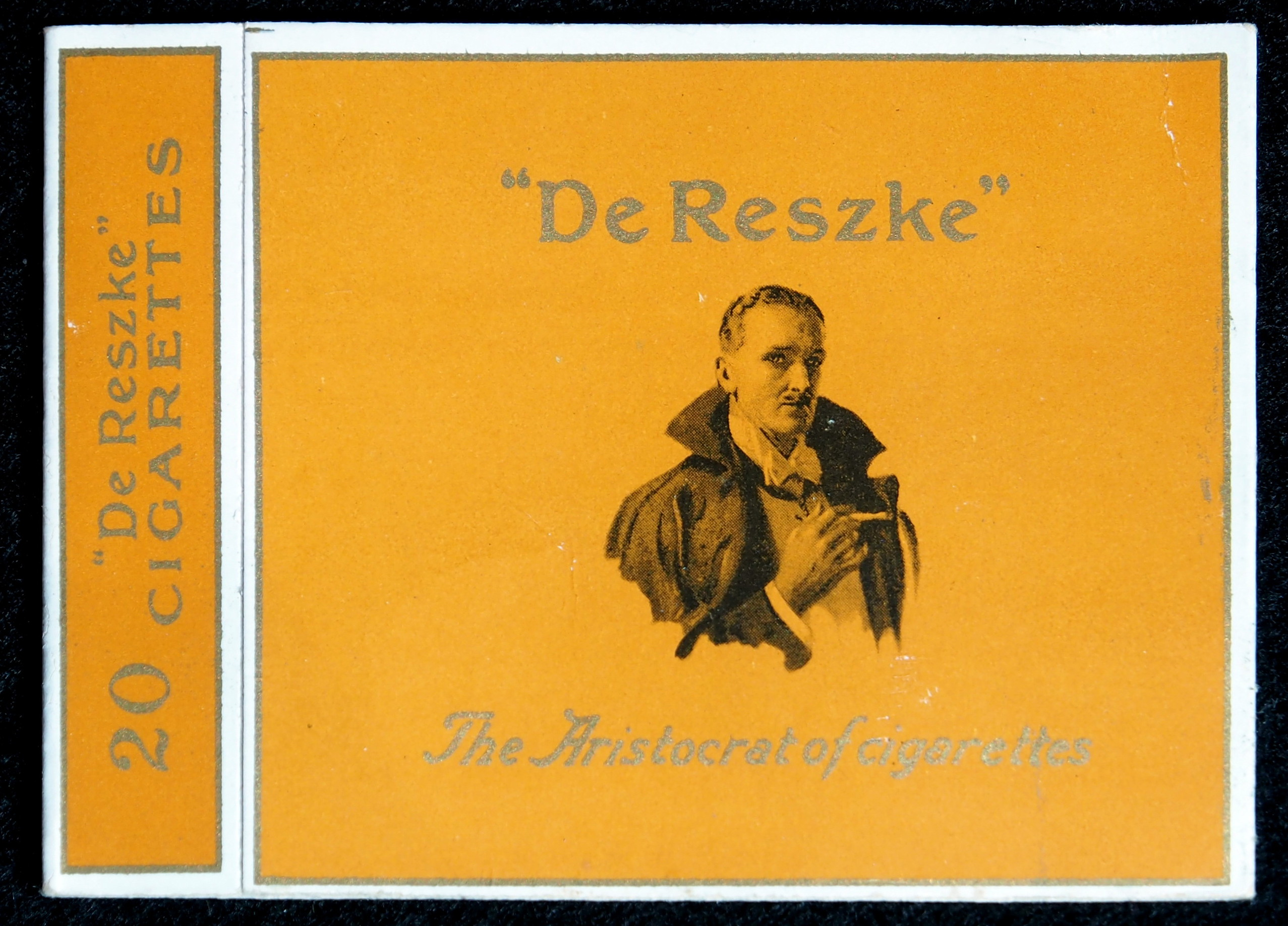

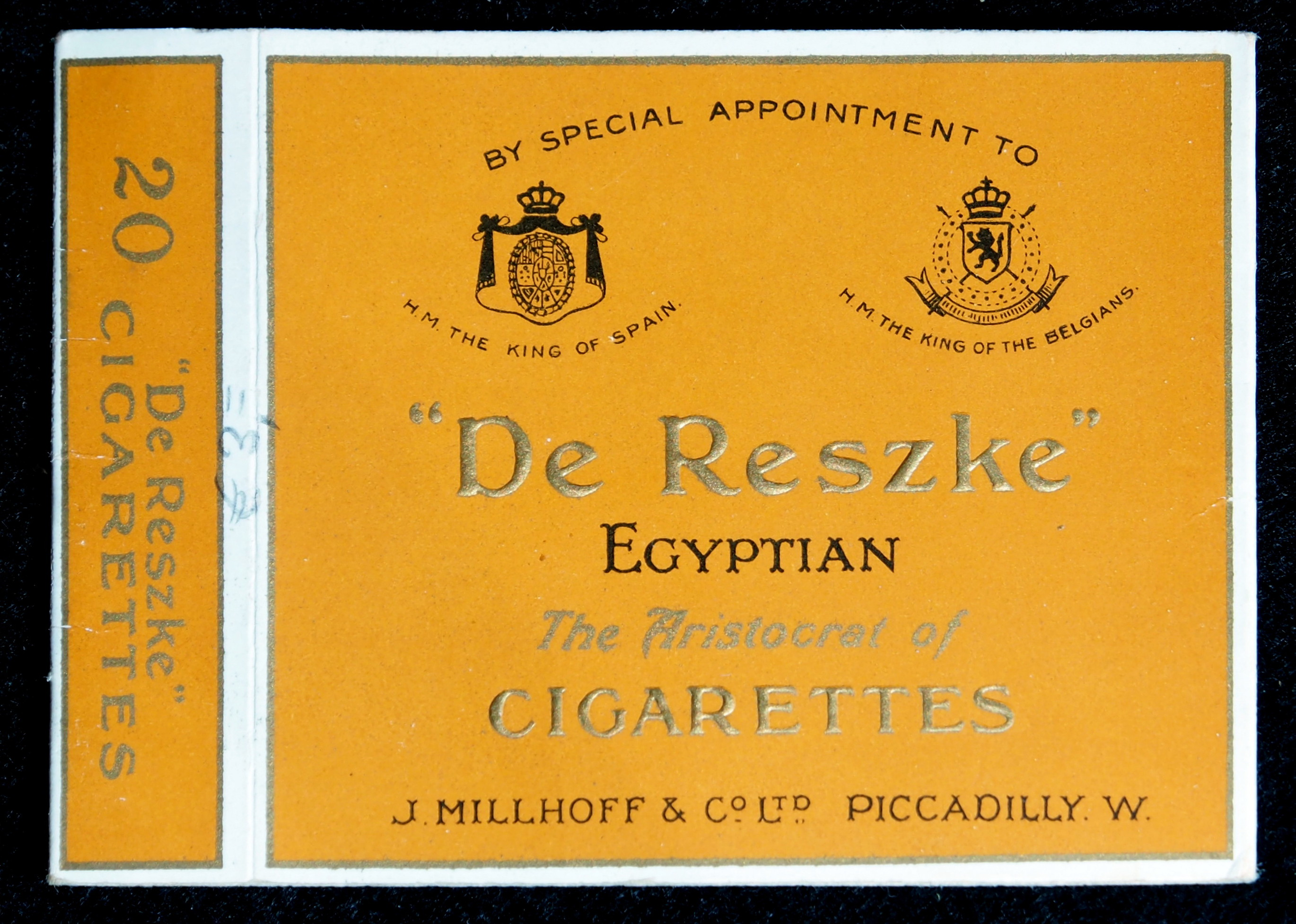

== Recordings ==
De Reszke made two commercial recordings in 1905 for the Fonotipia label. One of the tomb scene from Gounod's Roméo et Juliette and another of the celebrated aria 'O Souverain o Juge o Père' from Massenet's Le Cid. Unfortunately, he was dissatisfied with the results and prohibited their release. There have been numerous theories of what became of them; some claimed they were destroyed by De Reszke himself on the spot, while others say that there still is some hope that at least one of them survived (one of the more persistent rumors being that a copy of the Roméo record is currently being kept in a vault in an unspecified bank in Paris, but details regarding its veracity are scarce). Either way the recordings are still lost to this day and are considered the 'Holy Grail' of records.

While in New York, he also recorded his voice on at least one Bettini cylinder, which is also lost (destroyed in World War I bombings along with an entire Bettini warehouse in France).

Also rumored to exist is a private recording made for Queen Alexandra of Denmark, which according to the book 'Jean de Reszke and the Great Days of Opera' by Clara Leiser, is now in the possession of the British Royal Family.

At present however, only a couple of Mapleson Cylinders recorded live during a few of his performances at the Metropolitan Opera in 1901 exist. The sound is not optimal and one can only hear a faint 'echo' of his voice, but it is enough to get a rather decent picture of him as an artist (especially in regard to his phrasing). A few of them have been released with other performances recorded by Mapleson on CD by the Symposium label.

== Appearances ==
=== Royal Opera House ===
His appearances at the Royal Opera House at Covent Garden include:

- 1888 – Royal Italian Opera Season (15 May – 21 July)
  - as Vasco da Gama in L'Africaine (2, debut at Covent Garden in this role on 4 June)
  - as Radames in Aida (1)
  - as Riccardo in Un ballo in maschera (1)
  - as Faust in Faust (7, shared)
  - as Raoul in Les Huguenots (4)
  - as Lohengrin in Lohengrin (6)
- 1889 – Royal Italian Opera Season (18 May – 27 July)
  - as Radames in Aida (3, shared)
  - as Raoul in Les Huguenots (3)
  - as Lohengrin in Lohengrin (6, shared)
  - as Walther von Stolzing in Die Meistersinger (4)
  - as Romeo in Roméo et Juliette (7)
- 1890 – Royal Italian Opera Season (19 May – 28 July)
  - as Don Josè in Carmen (5)
  - as Phoebus in Esmeralda (3)
  - as Faust in Faust (6, shared)
  - as Lohengrin in Lohengrin (5, shared)
  - as Walther von Stolzing in Die Meistersinger (4)
  - as Jean de Leyden in Le prophète (5)
  - as Romeo in Roméo et Juliette (5)
- 1891 – Royal Italian Opera Season (6 April – 27 July)
  - as Don Josè in Carmen (7, shared)
  - as Faust in Faust (12, shared)
  - as Raoul in Les Huguenots (8, shared)
  - as Lohengrin in Lohengrin (9, shared)
  - as Walther von Stolzing in Die Meistersinger (2, shared)
  - as Otello in Otello (4)
  - as Jean de Leyden in Le prophète (3)
  - as Romeo in Roméo et Juliette (8)
- 1892 – Royal Opera Season (16 May – 28 July)
  - as Don Josè in Carmen (2, shared)
  - as Lancelot in Elaine (5)
  - as Lohengrin in Lohengrin (5, shared)
  - as Jean de Leyden in Le prophète (1)
  - as Romeo in Roméo et Juliette (3)
- 1893 – Royal Opera Season (15 May – 29 July)
  - as Faust in Faust (6, shared)
  - as Raoul in Les Huguenots (2)
  - as Lohengrin in Lohengrin (6, shared)
  - as Walther von Stolzing in Die Meistersinger (2)
  - as Romeo in Roméo et Juliette (7, shared)
- 1894 – Royal Opera Season (14 May – 30 July)
  - as Radames in Aida (2, shared)
  - as Lancelot in Elaine (2)
  - as Faust in Faust (7, shared)
  - as Lohengrin in Lohengrin (4, shared)
  - as Walther von Stolzing in Die Meistersinger (1)
  - as Romeo in Roméo et Juliette (7)
  - as Werther in Werther (1)
- 1896 – Royal Opera Season (11 May – 28 July)
  - as Faust in Faust (6)
  - as Lohengrin in Lohengrin (5)
  - as Walther von Stolzing in Die Meistersinger (5)
  - as Romeo in Roméo et Juliette (8)
  - as Tristan in Tristan und Isolde (4)
- 1897 – Royal Opera Season (10 May – 28 July)
  - as Lohengrin in Lohengrin (7, shared)
  - as Walther von Stolzing in Die Meistersinger (3)
  - as Romeo in Roméo et Juliette (6, shared)
  - as Siegfried in Siegfried (4)
  - as Tristan in Tristan und Isolde (3)
- 1898 – Royal Opera Season (9 May – 16 July)
  - as Siegfried in Gotterdammerung (3)
  - as Lohengrin in Lohengrin (7, shared)
  - as Walther von Stolzing in Die Meistersinger (4)
  - as Siegfried in Siegfried (3, shared)
  - as Tristan in Tristan und Isolde (4)
- 1899 – Royal Opera Season (8 May – 24 July)
  - as Faust in Faust (8, shared)
  - as Lohengrin in Lohengrin (6, shared)
  - as Walther von Stolzing in Die Meistersinger (2)
  - as Romeo in Roméo et Juliette (5, shared)
  - as Tristan in Tristan und Isolde (4)
- 1900 – Royal Opera Season (14 May – 30 July)
  - as Lohengrin in Lohengrin (6, shared)
  - as Walther von Stolzing in Die Meistersinger (2)
  - as Romeo in Roméo et Juliette (5, shared)

=== Gala and command appearances ===
Gala appearances with Édouard de Reszke at Covent Garden and command performances at Windsor Castle include:

- 2 July 1889 – Gala in honour of the Shah of Persia:
  - Éduoard as Mephistofele in Act I of Mefistofele and as Mefistofele in Act 4 of Faust
  - Jean as Faust in Act 4 of Faust
- 8 July 1891 – Visit of the Emperor and Empress of Germany
  - Édouard as Enrico in Act 1 of Lohengrin, as Laurent in Act 4 of Roméo et Juliette and as San Bris in Act 4 of Les Huguenots
  - Jean as Lohengrin in Act 1 of Lohengrin, as Romeo in Act 4 of Roméo et Juliette and as Raoul in Act 4 of Les Huguenots
- 4 July 1893 – Gala in honour of the marriage of the Duke of York (later George V) and Princess Mary of Teck (later Queen Mary)
  - Édouard as Laurent in Roméo et Juliette
  - Jean as Romeo in Roméo et Juliette
- 23 June 1897 – 60th Anniversary of Queen Victoria's accession
  - Édouard as Laurent in Act 3 of Roméo et Juliette
  - Jean as Romeo in Act 3 of Roméo et Juliette
- 27 June 1898 – Command Performance at Windsor Castle (no data on programme)
- 24 May 1899 – Command Performance at Windsor Castle
  - Édouard as Enrico in Lohengrin
  - Jean as Lohengrin in Lohengrin
- 16 July 1900 – Command Performance at Windsor Castle
  - Édouard as Mefistofele in Faust

== See also ==
- Eleonora de Cisneros

== Sources ==
- Klein, Herman (1925). "Jean de Reszke and Marie Brema: Some Reminiscences". The Musical Times. 66 (987): 405–408. doi:10.2307/912989. ISSN 0027-4666. JSTOR 912989.
- Leiser, Clara (1934). Jean de Reszke and the Great Days of Opera. Minton, Balch & Company.
