= Marthe Duvivier =

French opera singer

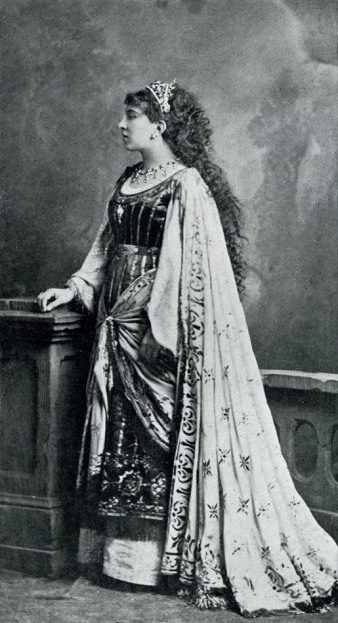
Portrait of Duvivier as Salomé in Hérodiade

Marthe Louise Ernestine Duvivier (27 April 1850, Paris – 28 May 1933, Paris) was a French operatic mezzo-soprano.

Born in Paris, Duvivier studied at the Conservatoire de Paris, where she received first prize for her work. On December 19, 1881, she created the role of Salomé in Hérodiade by Jules Massenet at La Monnaie in Brussels, afterwards accompanying the composer to a dinner party given for French attendees of the performance. She debuted at the Paris Opera on June 20, 1883, as Valentine in Les Huguenots by Giacomo Meyerbeer. Other of his operas in which she sang include L'Africaine, in which she performed Selika, and Le prophète, in which she sang Berthe; among the other roles which she essayed during her career were Ortrud in Lohengrin by Richard Wagner, Inez in La favorite by Gaetano Donizetti, Leonora in Il trovatore by Giuseppe Verdi, Marguerite in La damnation de Faust by Hector Berlioz, and Margherita in Mefistofele by Arrigo Boito. She also performed the music of Augusta Holmès. Massenet spoke highly of her "talent, reputation, and beauty", for which she won plaudits during her career. Besides Paris and Brussels, she also sang in Nantes. Duvivier married an inventor and had a daughter, Marguerite, whose son was archaeologist Max Mallowan. She later translated English novels into French under the pseudonym "Luce Gritte".
