= Jan Reszke =

Polish aristocrat and businessman (1818–1877)

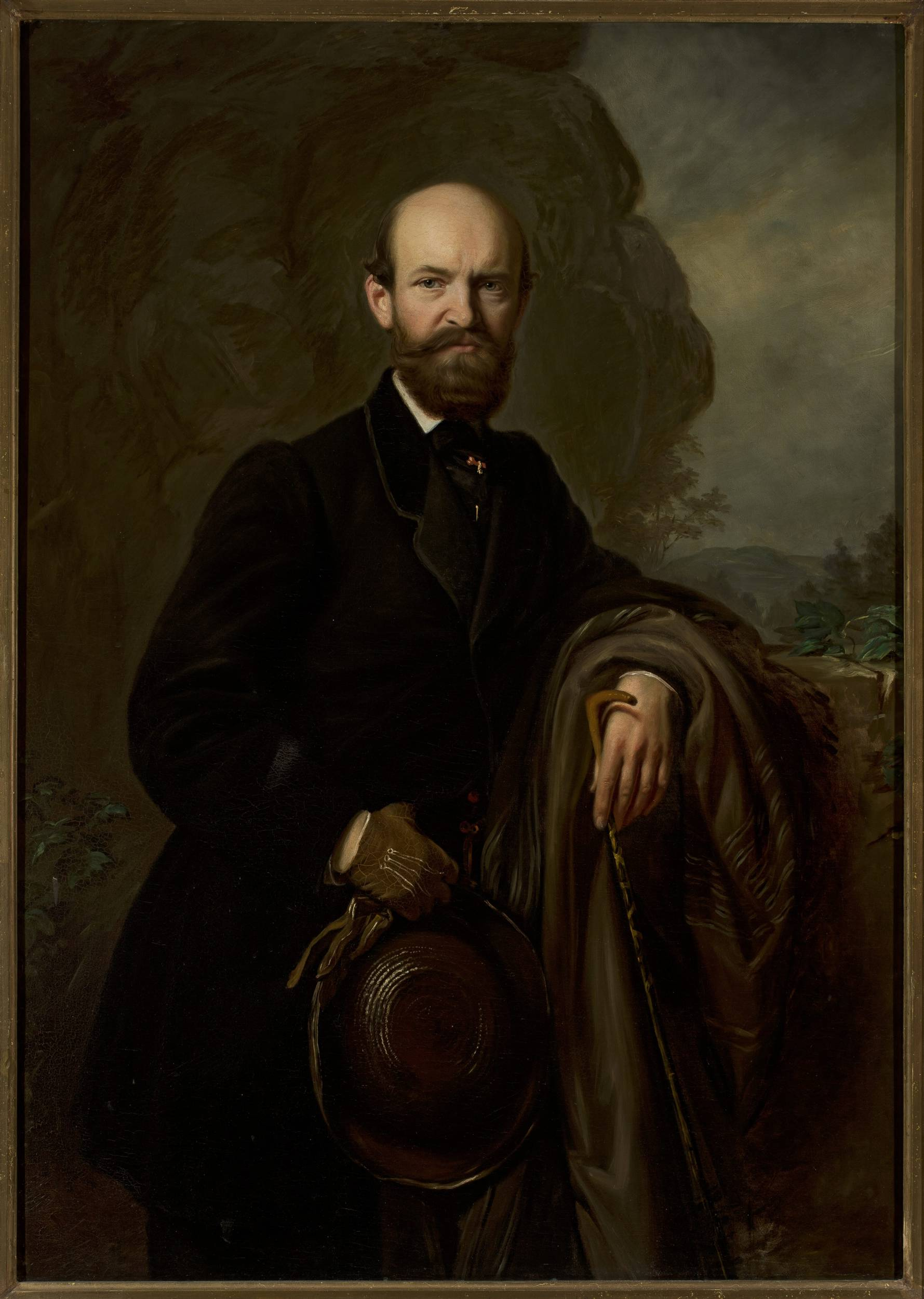
Józef Simmler, Portrait of Jan Reszke National Museum, Warsaw

Jan Reszke (1818–1877) was a Polish aristocrat, hotel operator, and the father of three opera singers Josephine (soprano), Jean (tenor) and Édouard de Reszke (bass). The family's life centered around music, including weekly concerts at their residence. Artists stayed at their hotel and held rehearsals in their attached house. His wife, Emilja, was a mezzo-soprano who taught her children to sing and arranged for singing lessons outside the home.

Reszke was a participant of the January Uprising of 1863 and was forced into exile in Siberia by the Russians. While he was away, Emilja ran the household, raised the children, and operated the family's hotel, Hôtel de Saxe (de). (Note: Leiser states that the family owned Hotel Saski, but that hotel was not owned by the Reszke / Reszków family. It is also in a different location than the addresses given for the Reszke's hotel.)

== Early life ==
Jan Mieczyslaw Reszke was born in 1818 to Jan Bogumil and Josefa Reszke. His father was orphaned as a child and was alone in Warsaw upon the death of his benefactor Baron von Runckel. Jan Bogumil Reszke became a successful businessman and was one of the richest men in Poland by 1830. A philanthropist, he was held in high esteem within the community. Upon his father's death, Reszke inherited property that provided revenue for the family.

Reszke's ancestors lived in the Mazovia region of present-day Poland—and probably in or near Gostynin—since the 13th or 14th century. By the 15th century, they had a coat of arms, which is Prussian. Some of the family migrated to Saxony and Prussia. They were Protestants and family members are buried at the Reszke plot in the Evangelical Church cemetery in Warsaw.

== Career ==
Reszke was a Chevalier of the Order of Saint Stanislaus. He was also an honorary judge, justice of the peace, state official, and a controller of the railroad.

=== Hôtel de Saxe ===
He established Hôtel de Saxe (de) in the center of Warsaw. He and his wife operated the hotel that catered to artists from Moscow, Berlin, and Paris. It adjoined their residence. Once the largest hotel in Warsaw with about 100 rooms, it is located on 3 and 5 Kozia Street and 33 and 39 Krakowskie Przedmieście on the (Royal Route). Their house on Kozia Street being a recognized musical centre.

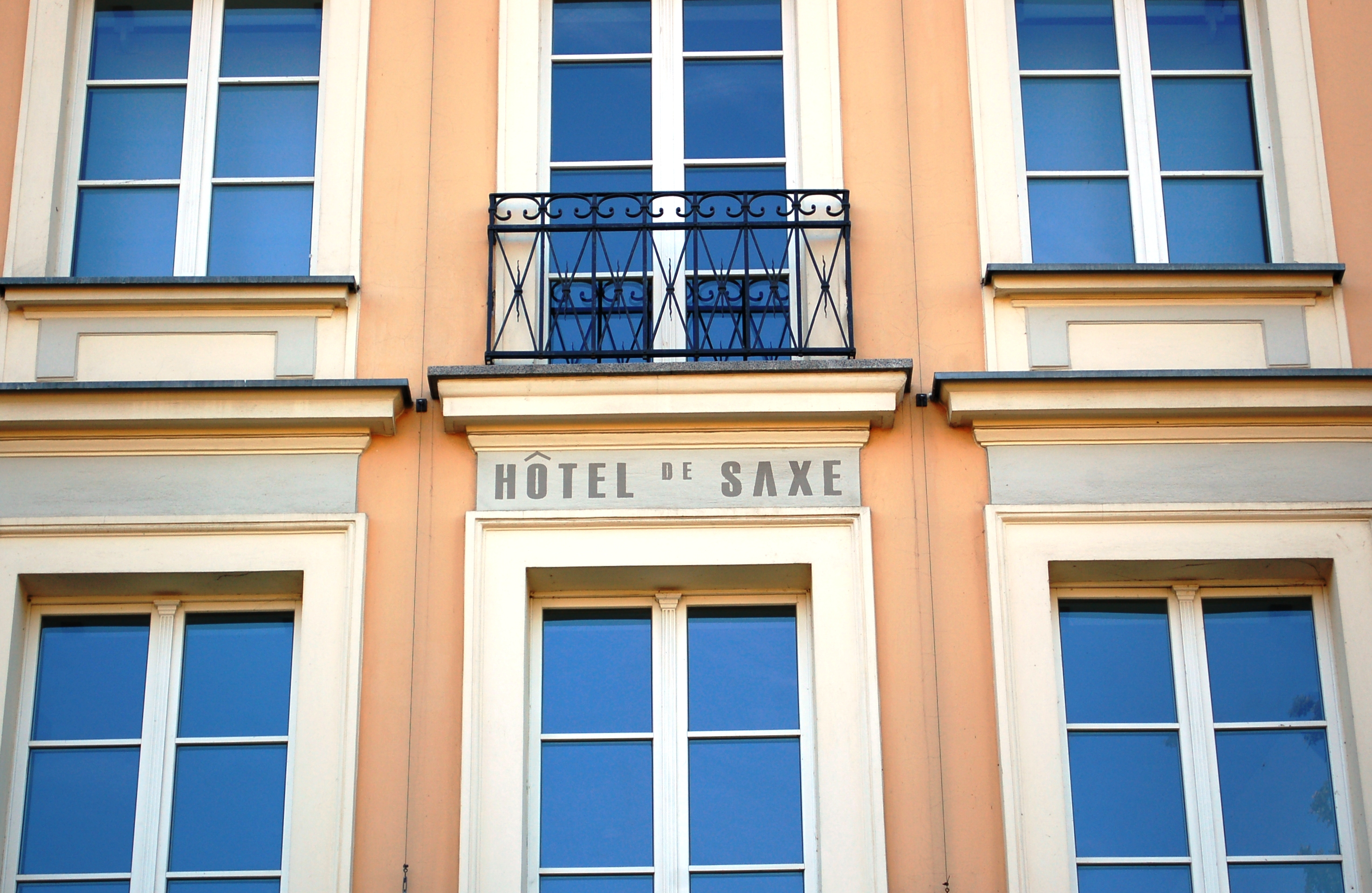
Hôtel de Saxe (de)

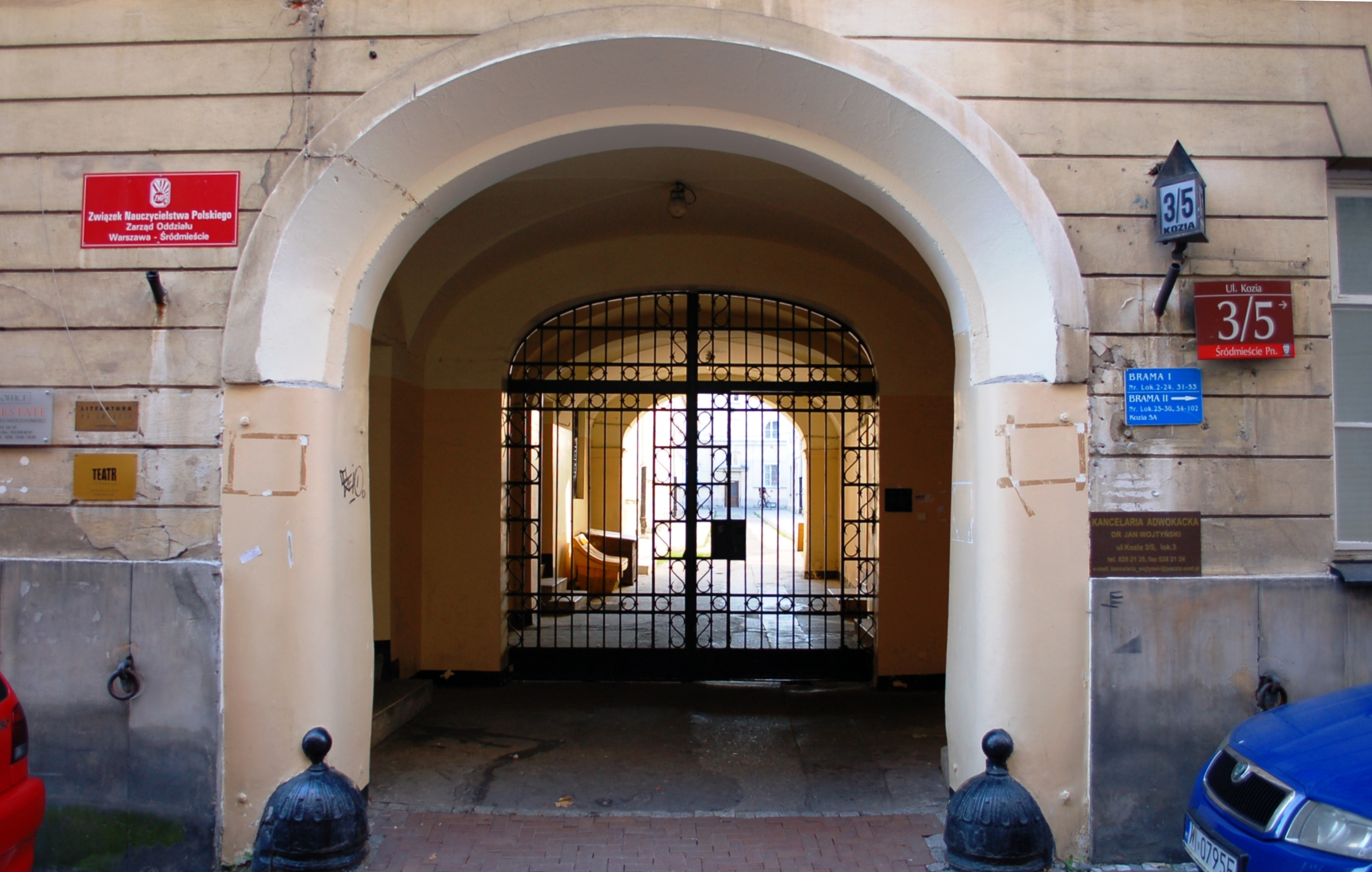
Gates to interior courtyard

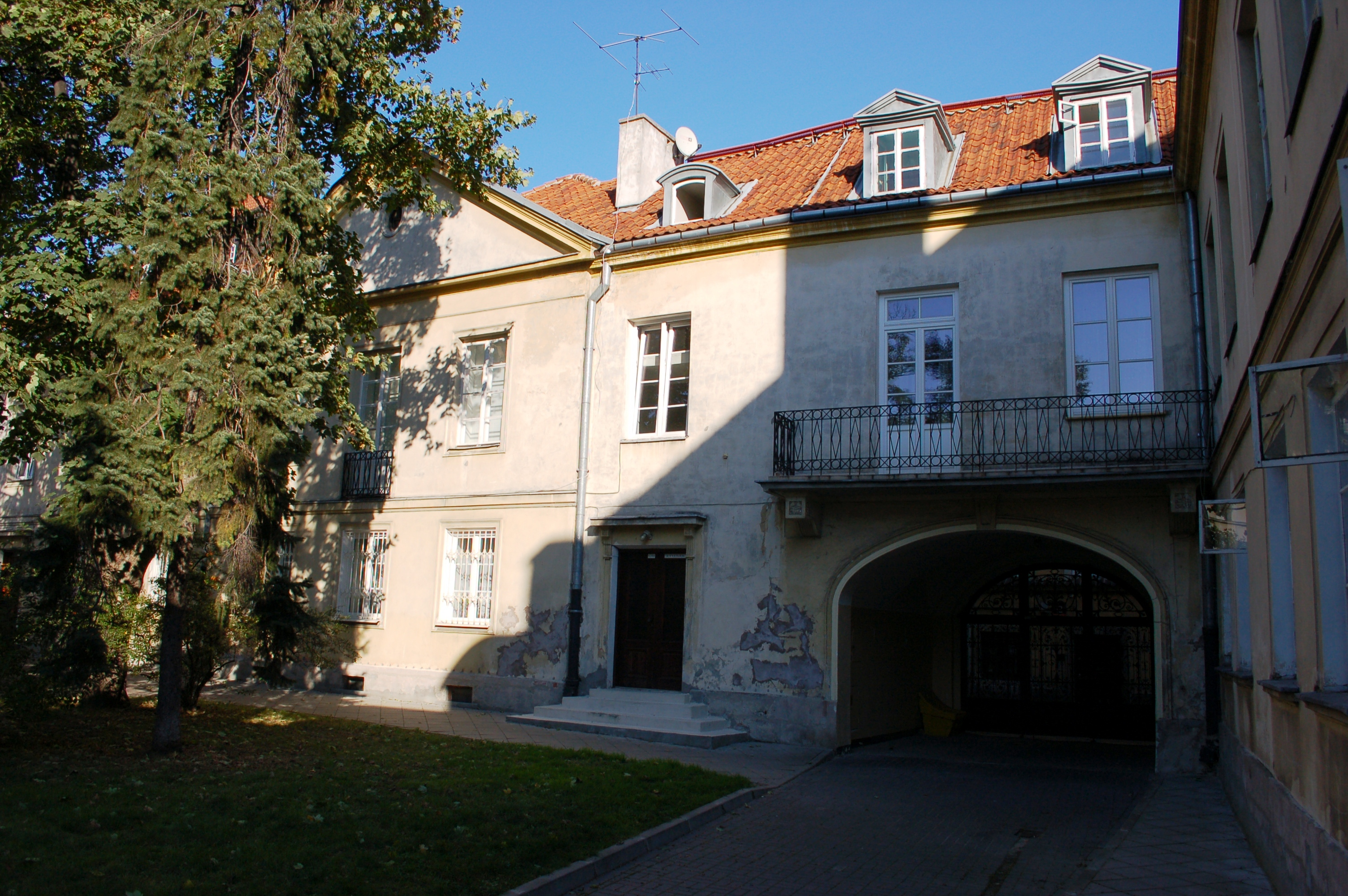
Interior courtyard

== Marriage and children ==
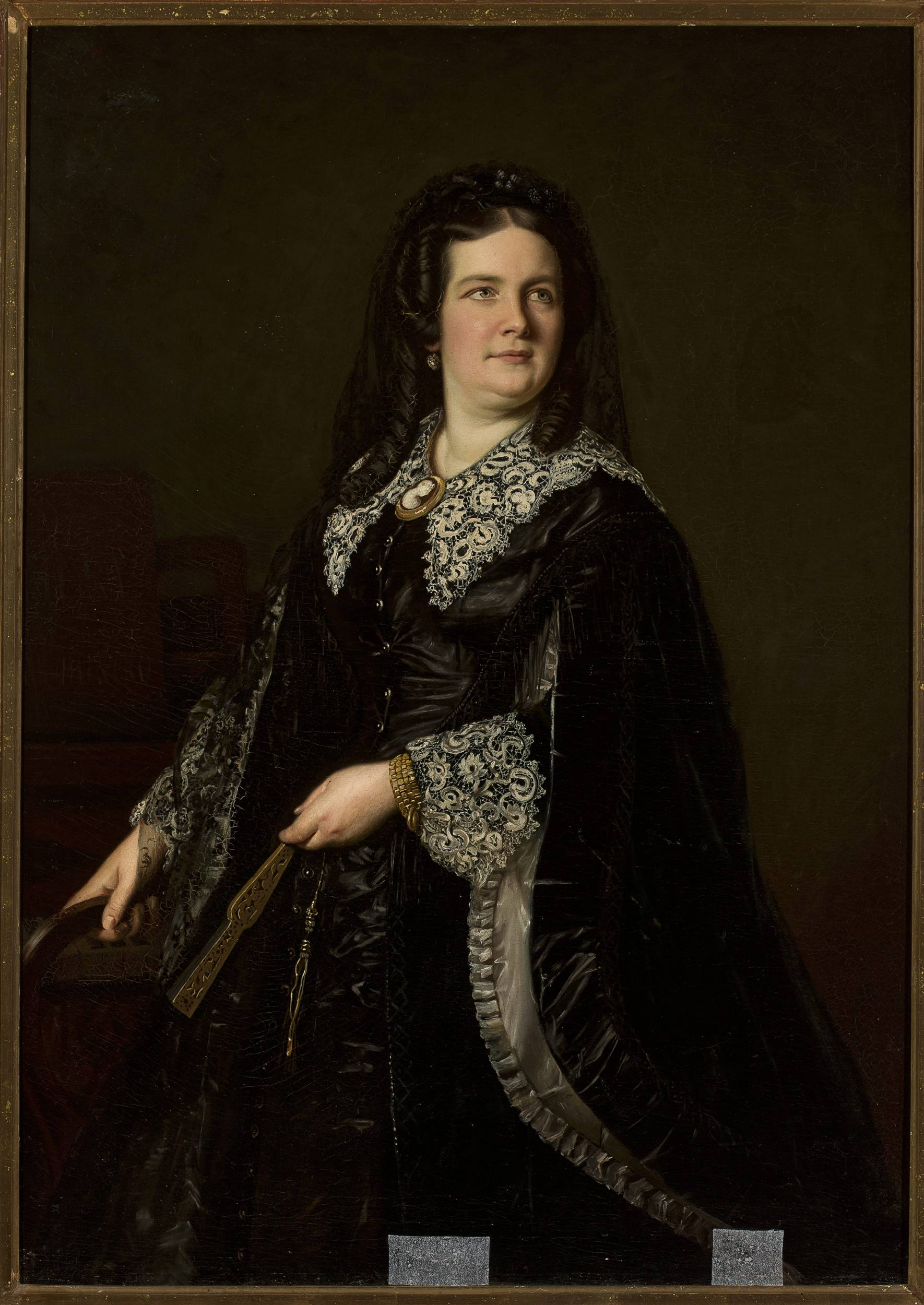
Józef Simmler, Portrait of Emilia Reszke, National Museum, Warsaw

In 1843, Reszke married Emilja (also Emilie) Ufniarska (born ca. 1827), a Galician. A mezzo-soprano, she studied under Manuel García and Pauline Viardot, his daughter. Emilja had a clear, powerful voice. She traveled throughout Italy and attended performances by the great masters of the opera. In Warsaw, she performed as Desdemona in William Shakespeare's Otello by Gioachino Rossini at the Grand Theatre. She performed for charity events. Reszke, a baritone, played the violin and wrote songs for his wife. He encouraged the idea of bringing Wagner concerts to Warsaw.

They had five children: Emilia, Jean (born 1850), Édouard (1853), Josephine (1855), and Victor (1859). The children were raised in the Roman Catholic faith, as was their mother. The three opera-singing Reszke children invested their earnings from the stage in Polish land, having estates in Bartkowice, Borowno, Chorzenice, Garnek, Kłobukowice, Nieznanice, Skrzydlów, and Witkowo.

== Music ==
Artist's rehearsals for upcoming performances were held in their house. The Reszkes held concerts on Friday nights with duets, arias and choral music. The night began with tea and concluded with dinner. Both Jan and Emilja performed at charity events.

Emilja taught her children to sing; all were talented singers. At times the four oldest children, called the Reszke Quartet, performed together. Viktor was not interested in music. The family spent their summers at Wilanów, and the children sang at the church there. Josephine, Jean, and Édouard sang at a soirée in 1869. Josephine de Reszke, a soprano, and Édouard de Reszke performed in Western Europe beginning in the 1870s. Jean sang soprano solos as a boy in Warsaw Cathedral. Édouard debuted in Aida in Paris in April 1876. Jean and Édouard performed at opera houses in Europe and the United States, including the Paris Opera, London's Royal Opera House, Venice's Teatro la Fenice, and New York's Metropolitan Opera.

== January Uprising of 1863 ==
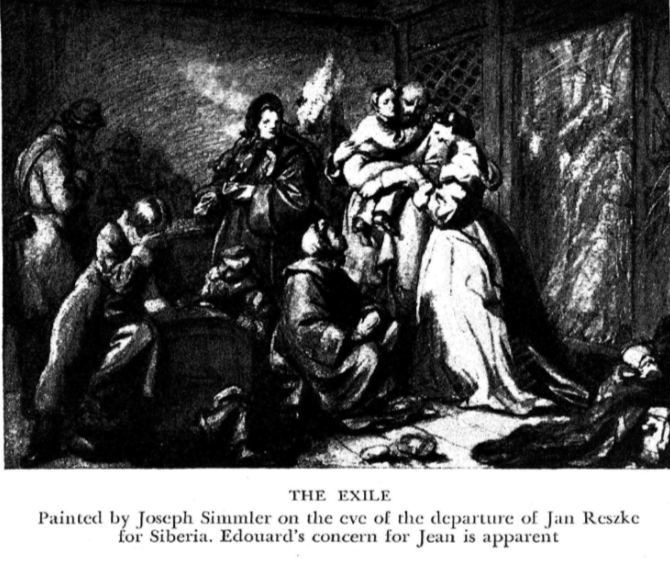
Józef Simmler, The Exile, as Jan Reszke is about to be taken by Russian soldiers to Siberia

Concerned about the welfare of his fellow Polish citizens, he was a participant of the January Uprising of 1863. He was sentenced by the Russian government to five years of exile in Siberia. As the family said their goodbyes, Józef Simmler sketched the family. The work is entitled The Exile.

Emilja took care of her children and ran the hotel during his absence. Jean studied law and received his degree, but followed his vision for a career in music. So did Édouard, who had studied at an agricultural college.

== Death ==
Reszke died suddenly on 4 May 1877 and was buried in the family plot at the Evangelic Cemetery. Emilja died in 1885.

== Popular culture ==
This Reszke family was mentioned in Arthur Conan Doyle's The Hound of the Baskervilles. The music-loving Sherlock Holmes said to Watson "I have a box for Les Huguenots. Have you heard the de Reszkes?". He was referring to Jean de Reszke, who performed as Raoul de Nangis in Les Huguenots and Édouard who performed as both Graf von Saint-Bris and Marcel at Covent Garden on 11 July 1887.

== Sources ==
- Klein, Herman (1925). "Jean de Reszke and Marie Brema: Some Reminiscences". The Musical Times. 66 (987): 405–408. doi:10.2307/912989. ISSN 0027-4666. JSTOR 912989.
- Leiser, Clara (1934). Jean de Reszke and the Great Days of Opera. Minton, Balch & Company.
