= Tadeusz Ajdukiewicz =

Polish painter (1852–1916)

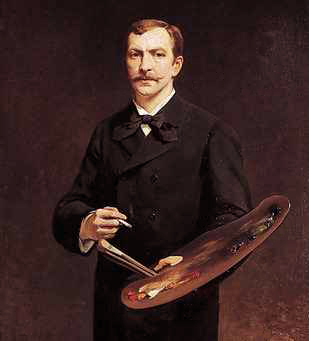
- Self-portrait
- Born: Tadeusz Ajdukiewicz; 1852; Wieliczka, Austrian Empire
- Died: 1916 (aged 63–64); Kraków, Austria-Hungary
- Known for: Painter
- Notable work: The portrait of Helena Modrzejewska, The military parade of the Romanian army
- Movement: Realism

Tadeusz Ajdukiewicz (1852 – 9 January 1916) was a Polish realist painter best known for his battle-scenes, portraits, landscapes and paintings of horses. He was educated in Kraków in the Austrian sector of the Partitioned Poland. He died in the armed struggle for Poland's independence around Kraków during World War I.

== Biography ==
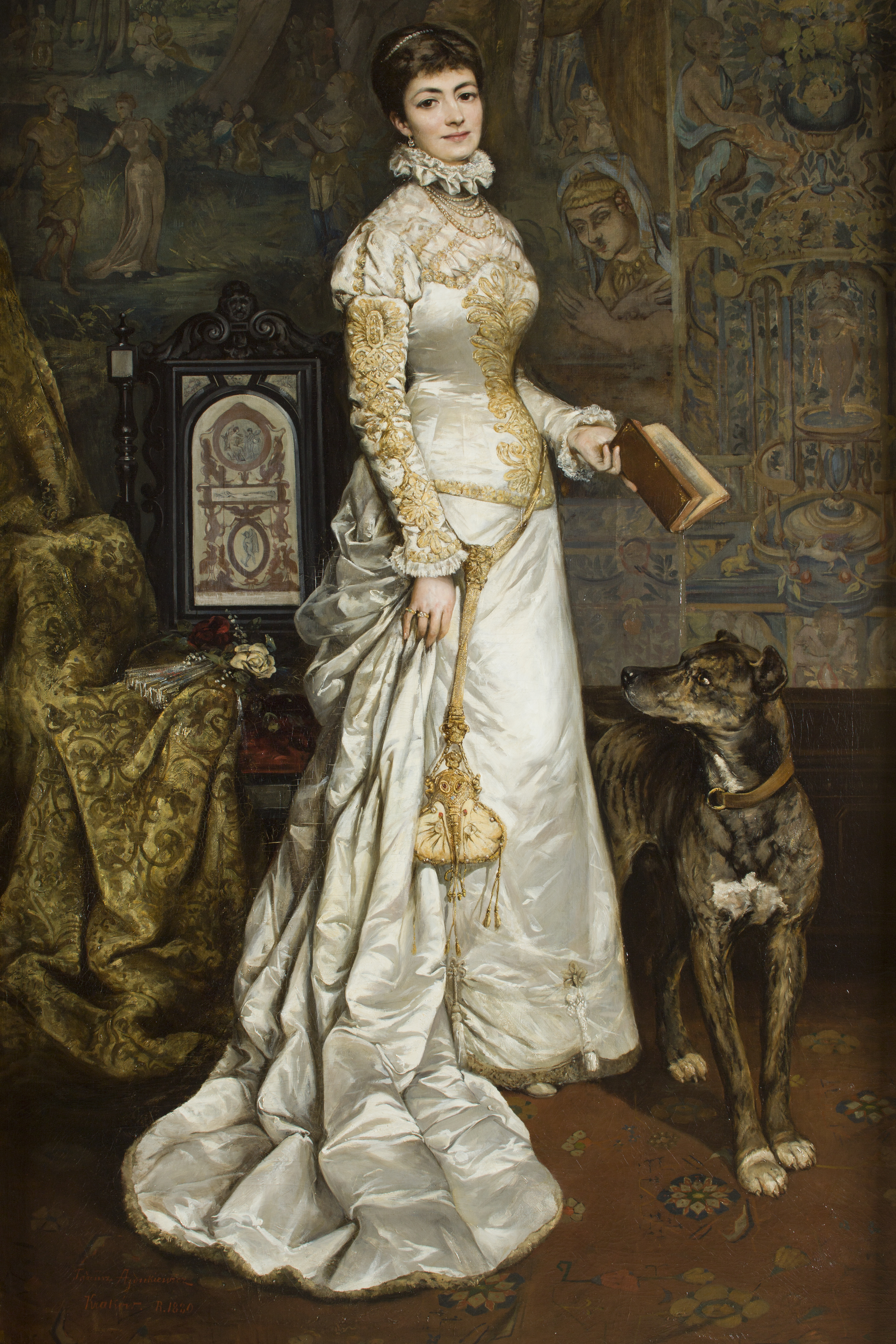
The portrait of Helena Modrzejewska, 1880

Ajdukiewicz was born in Wieliczka. From 1868 to 1873, he studied under Władysław Łuszczkiewicz in the School of Fine Arts in Kraków. Later, he travelled to Vienna and Munich on a scholarship along with Wojciech Kossak and studied in Józef Brandt's atelier among other places. In 1877, Ajdukiewicz travelled to Paris and the Near East with Count Władysław Branicki. In 1882, he lived in Vienna, where he worked on commissions for the aristocracy. He painted a portrait of the Prince of Wales in 1883 while staying in London.

Ajdukiewicz travelled to Constantinople in 1884, and was a guest of Sultan Abdul Hamid II. Subsequently, he worked in Sofia, Saint Petersburg and Bucharest. He joined the 1st Brigade of the Polish Legions in 1914 created by Józef Piłsudski, and died in battle around Kraków on 9 January 1916 during World War I.

His first cousin was a Polish historical painter Zygmunt Ajdukiewicz (1861-1917) born in Witkowice.

== Works ==
Tadeusz Ajdukiewicz is mainly known for his standing portraits, such as The portrait of Helena Modrzejewska, and for his numerous paintings of battle scenes and equestrian portraits of nobility. He was also noted for his genre and oriental paintings. Commissioned by the Romanian Ministry of War, he also produced an album devoted to imperial army uniform while in Bucharest.

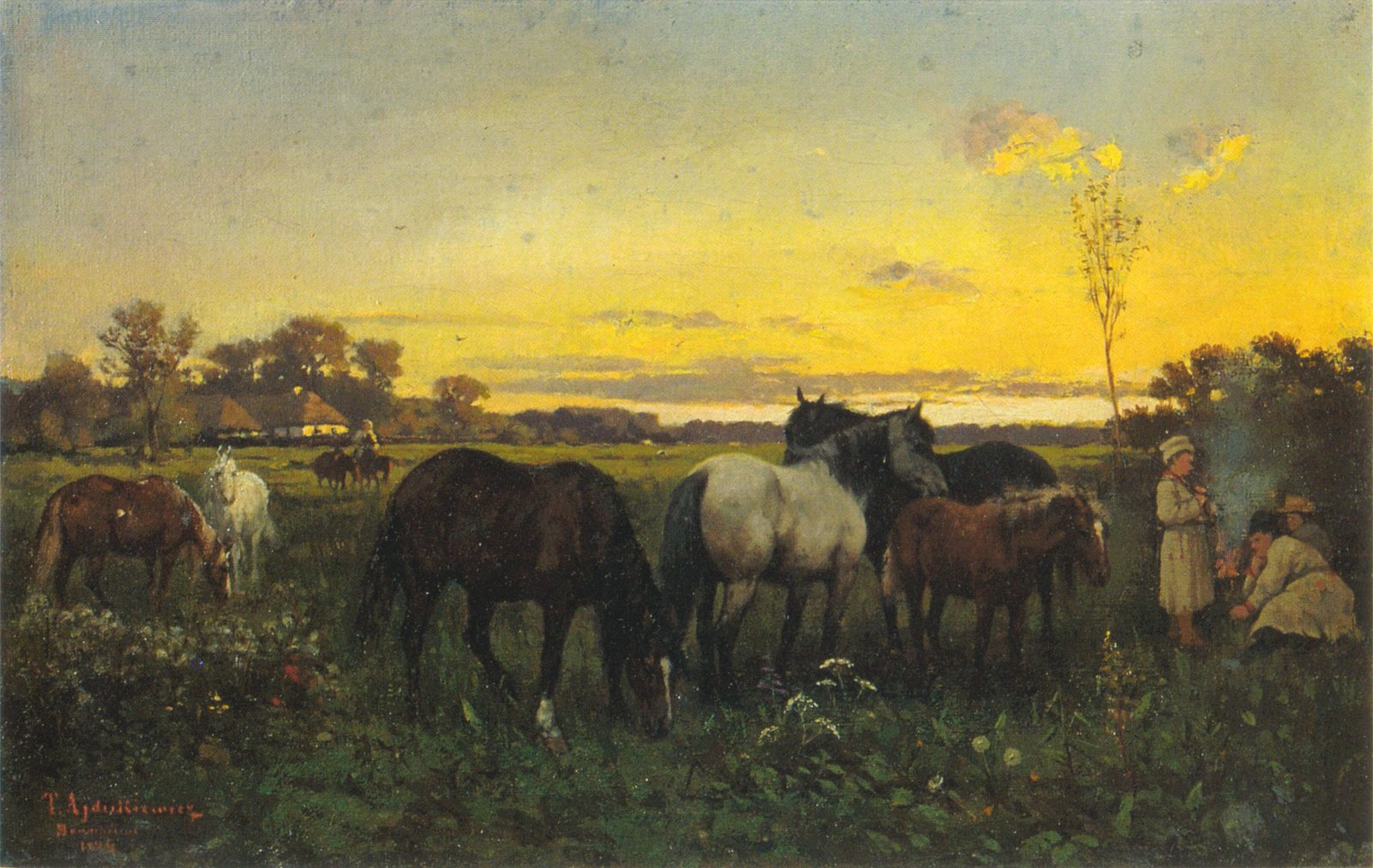
Konie na pastwisku

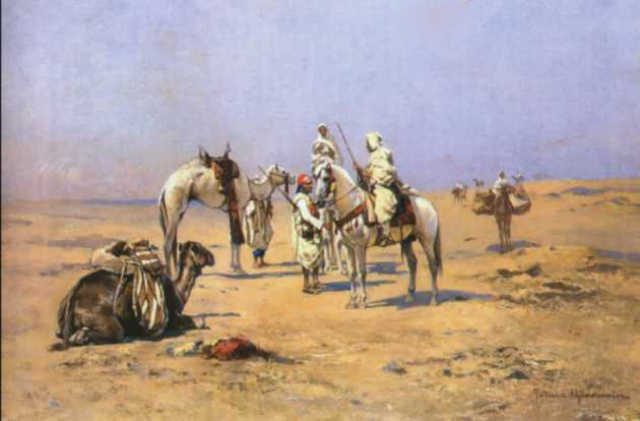
Spotkanie na pustyni

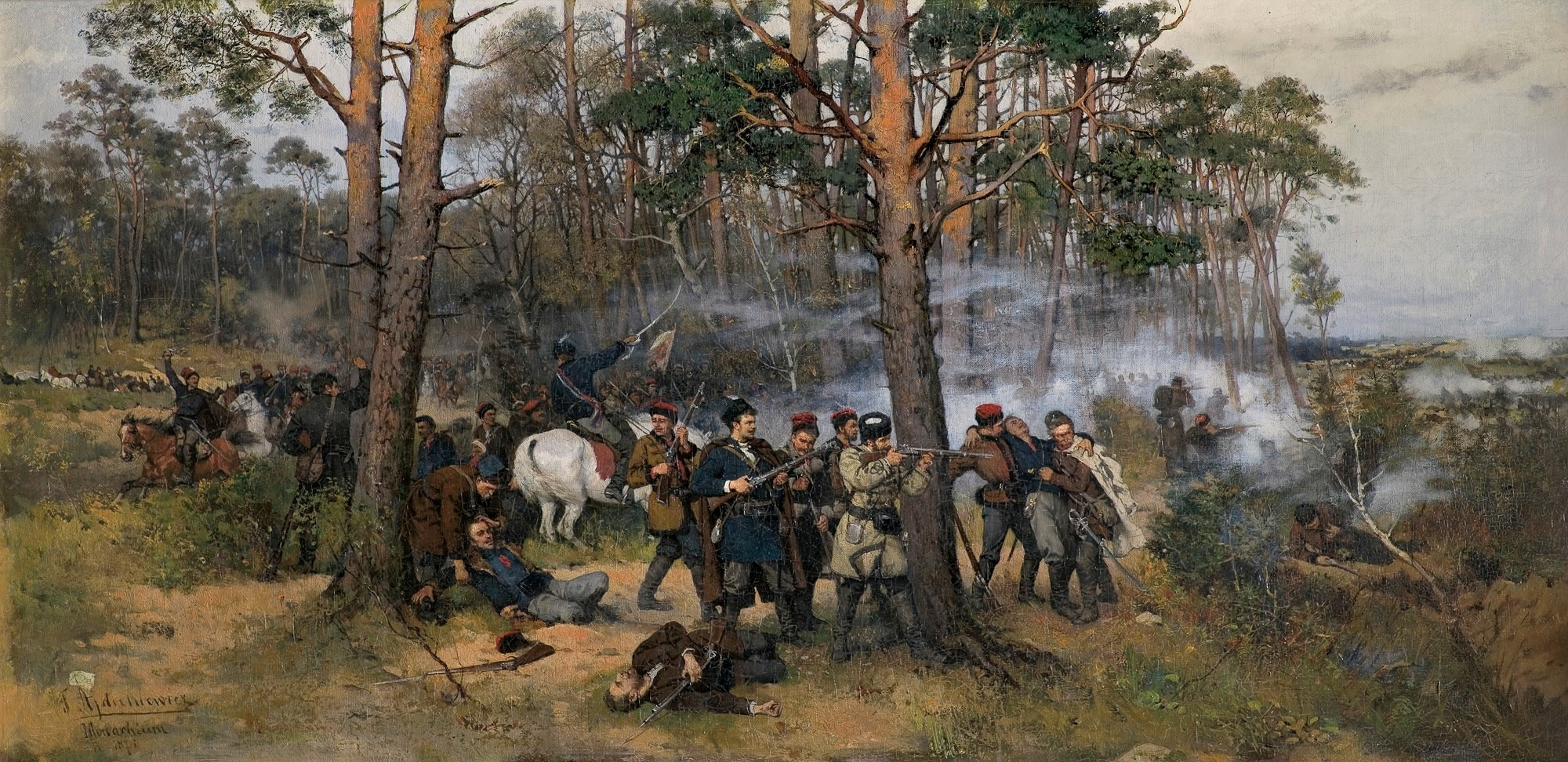
January Uprising of 1863

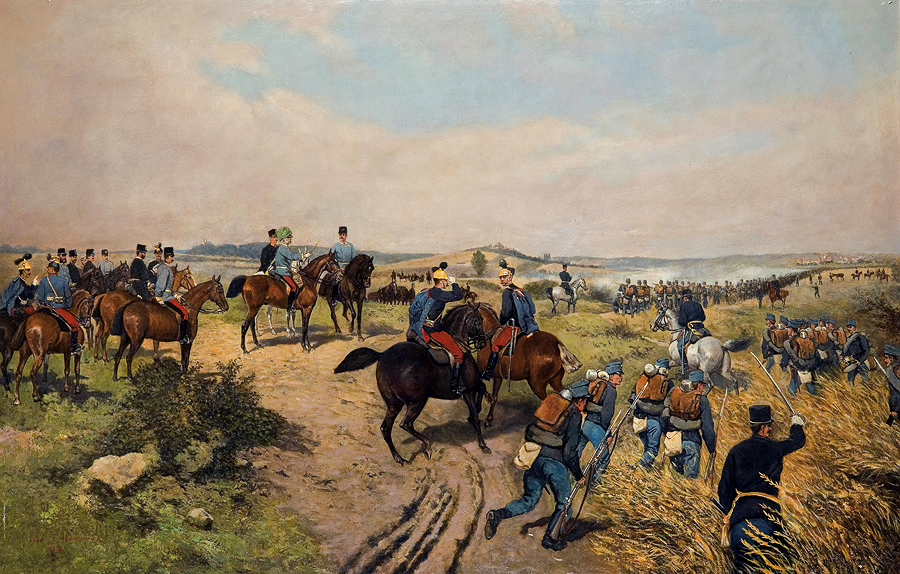
Military exercises of 1885

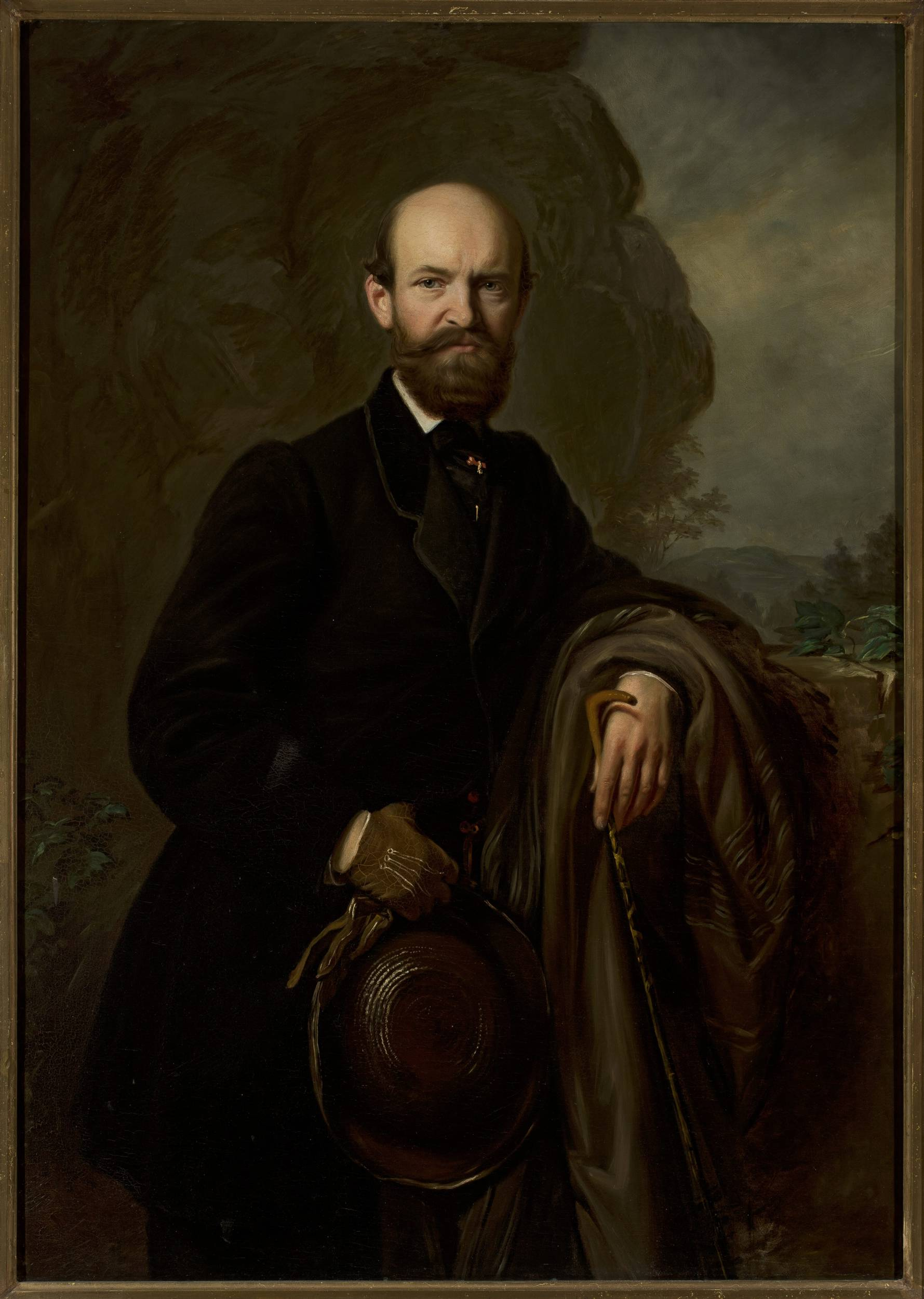
Portrait of Jan Reszke National Museum, Warsaw

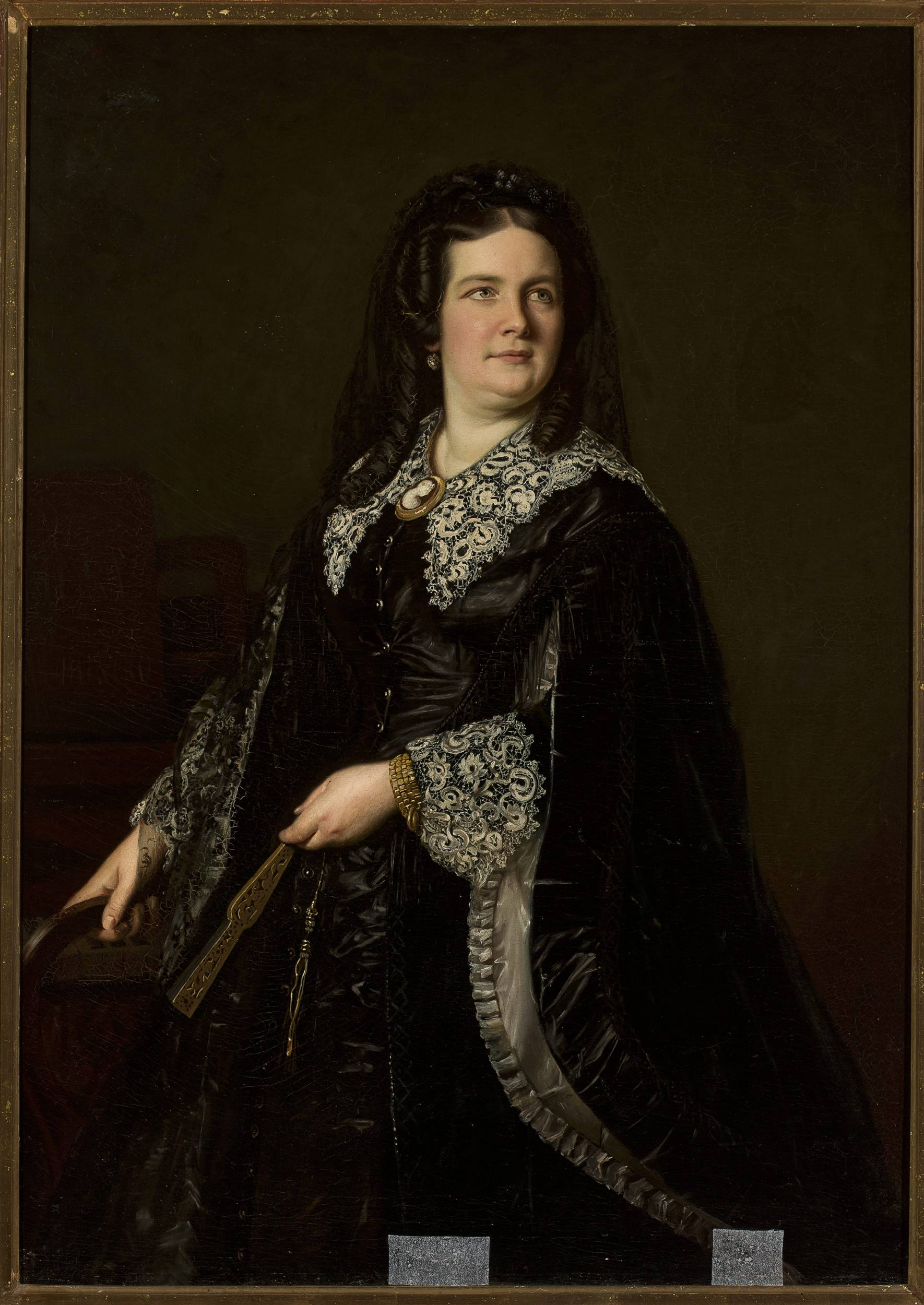
Portrait of Emilia Reszke, National Museum, Warsaw

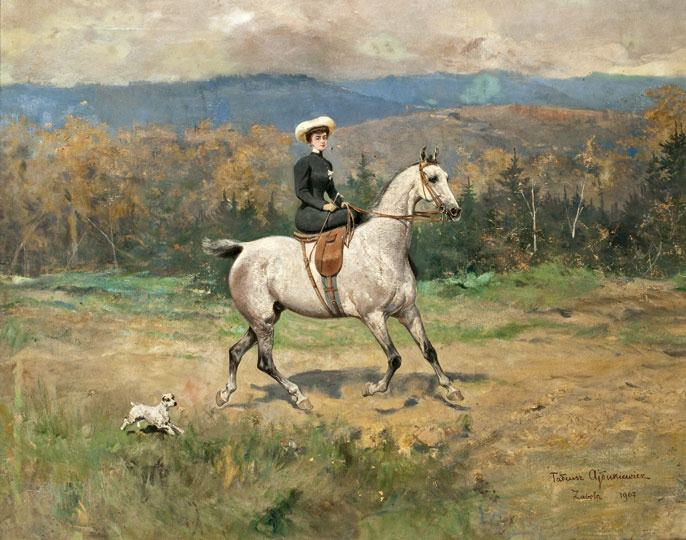
Portrait of Bethlen Klementina, Countess Mikes - Zabola, 1907

== Notes and references ==
- Media related to Tadeusz Ajdukiewicz at Wikimedia Commons
