= Hérodiade =

Opera by Jules Massenet

- Opera by Jules Massenet
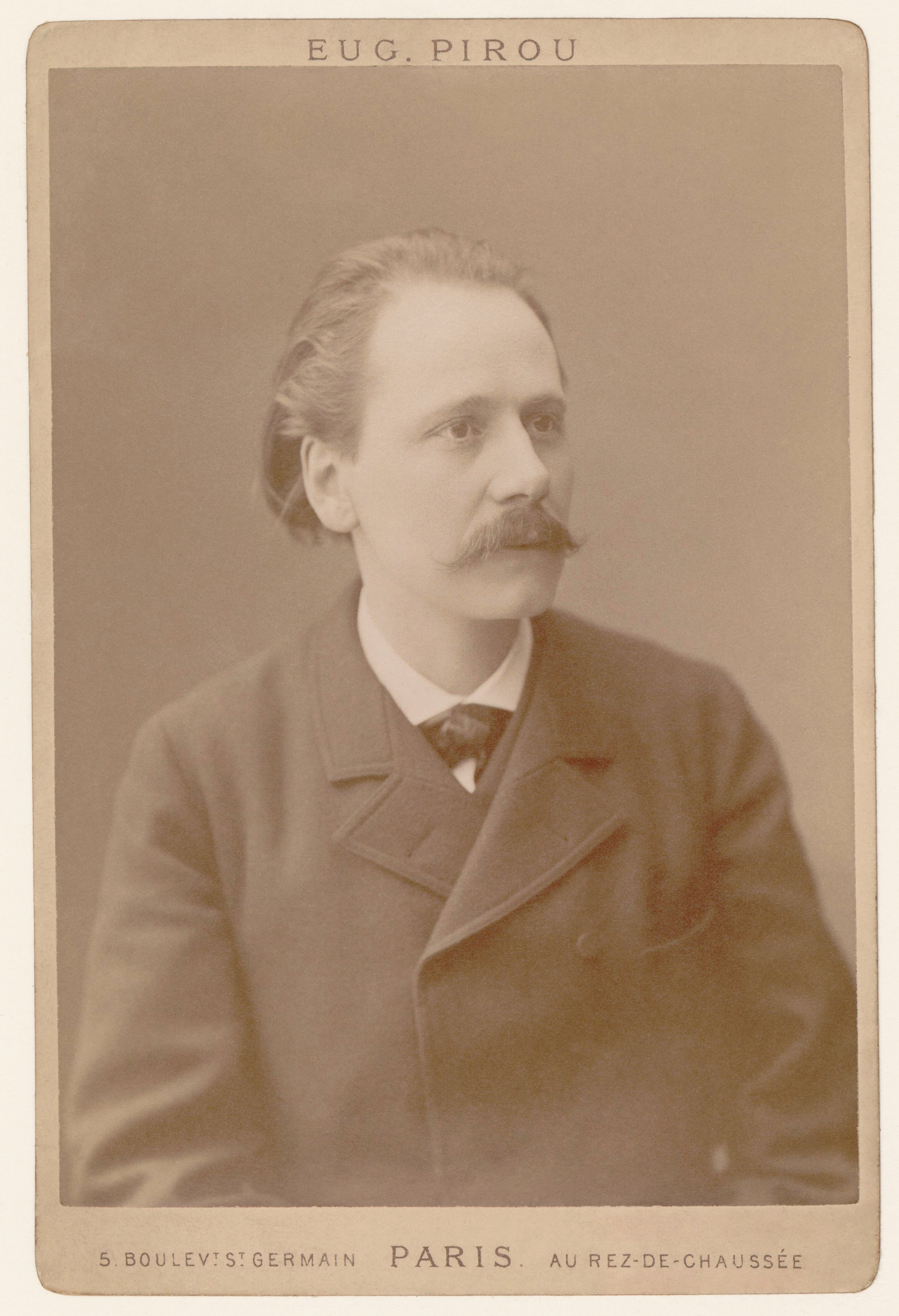
- The composer, photographed in 1895
- Librettist: Paul Milliet; Henri Grémont
- Language: French
- Based on: Hérodias by Gustave Flaubert
- Premiere: 19 December 1881; Théâtre de la Monnaie, Brussels

Hérodiade is an opera in four acts (seven scenes) by Jules Massenet to a French libretto by Paul Milliet and Henri Grémont, based on the novella Hérodias (1877) by Gustave Flaubert. It was first performed at the Théâtre de la Monnaie in Brussels on 19 December 1881. (At the world premiere in 1881, and for all performances prior to the Paris series in 1884, it was performed in three acts and 5 scenes.)

The libretto is a retelling of the story of John the Baptist, Salome, Herod Antipas and Herodias, but is strikingly less psychological and bloody than Richard Strauss's Salome, which is based on a text by Oscar Wilde. The opera premiered in Brussels because Auguste Vaucorbeil, Manager of the Paris Opera house refused to stage the work; "I do like your music," he had said to Massenet, "but as for the libretto, you badly need an author who knows how to build the skeleton of a play."

Massenet also created a ballet suite derived from the opera.

== Performance history ==
The opera reached Paris at the Théâtre des Nations on 1 February 1884, and the final performance of the run on 13 March featured the three De Reszkes; Jean (Jean), Édouard (Phanuel), and Josephine (Salomé). It was produced at the Théâtre-Italien in 1903 for 43 performances, then at the Gaîté-Lyrique in 1904, 1911 and 1912. The Italian premiere was at La Scala on 23 February 1882.

Occasional productions have continued, such as the annual opera at the Roman amphitheatre in Orange in 1960 with Suzanne Sarocca as Salomé, Rita Gorr as Hérodiade, Robert Massard as Hérode, conducted by Pierre Dervaux, Gorr having appeared just before in the title role in Bordeaux. At the Wexford Festival 1977, Bernadette Greevy led a cast including Eilene Hannan as Salomé and Malcolm Donnelly as Hérode; Greevy later sang the role in Dublin in June 2000 for Anna Livia Opera.

A production in Rome in April 1986 brought together Montserrat Caballé as Salomé, José Carreras as Jean, Juan Pons as Hérode and Ferruccio Furlanetto as Phanuel, with Gianluca Gelmetti conducting. Another production in Orange in 1987 was due to feature Caballé, Carreras and Elena Obraztsova but all three withdrew through illness; the conductor was Jacques Delacôte; the production had come from Nice where Grace Bumbry had undertaken the title role. March 1993 saw the opera mounted in Zurich with Bumbry in the title role, Cecilia Gasdia as Salomé and Rodney Gilfrey as Hérode, Manfred Honeck conducting. San Francisco Opera in 1994 staged the opera, conducted by Valery Gergiev, with Plácido Domingo as Jean, Renée Fleming as Salomé, Pons as Hérode and Dolora Zajick in the title role. A staging by Jean-Louis Pichon, seen in Liège in May 2002, was shared with Saint-Etienne, Avignon and Seville.

== Roles ==
Role	Voice type	Premiere cast, 19 December 1881 (Conductor: Joseph Dupont)
Salomé	soprano	Marthe Duvivier
Hérodiade	mezzo-soprano	Blanche Deschamps-Jéhin
Jean	tenor	Edmond Vergnet
Hérode	baritone	Théophile-Adolphe Manoury
Phanuel	bass	Léon Gresse
Vitellius	baritone	Henri Fontaine
A high priest	baritone	Boutens
A voice	tenor	Mansuède
A young Babylonian	soprano	Hervay
La Sulamite		Lonati
Chorus: Merchants, slaves, Israelites, Roman soldiers

== Synopsis ==
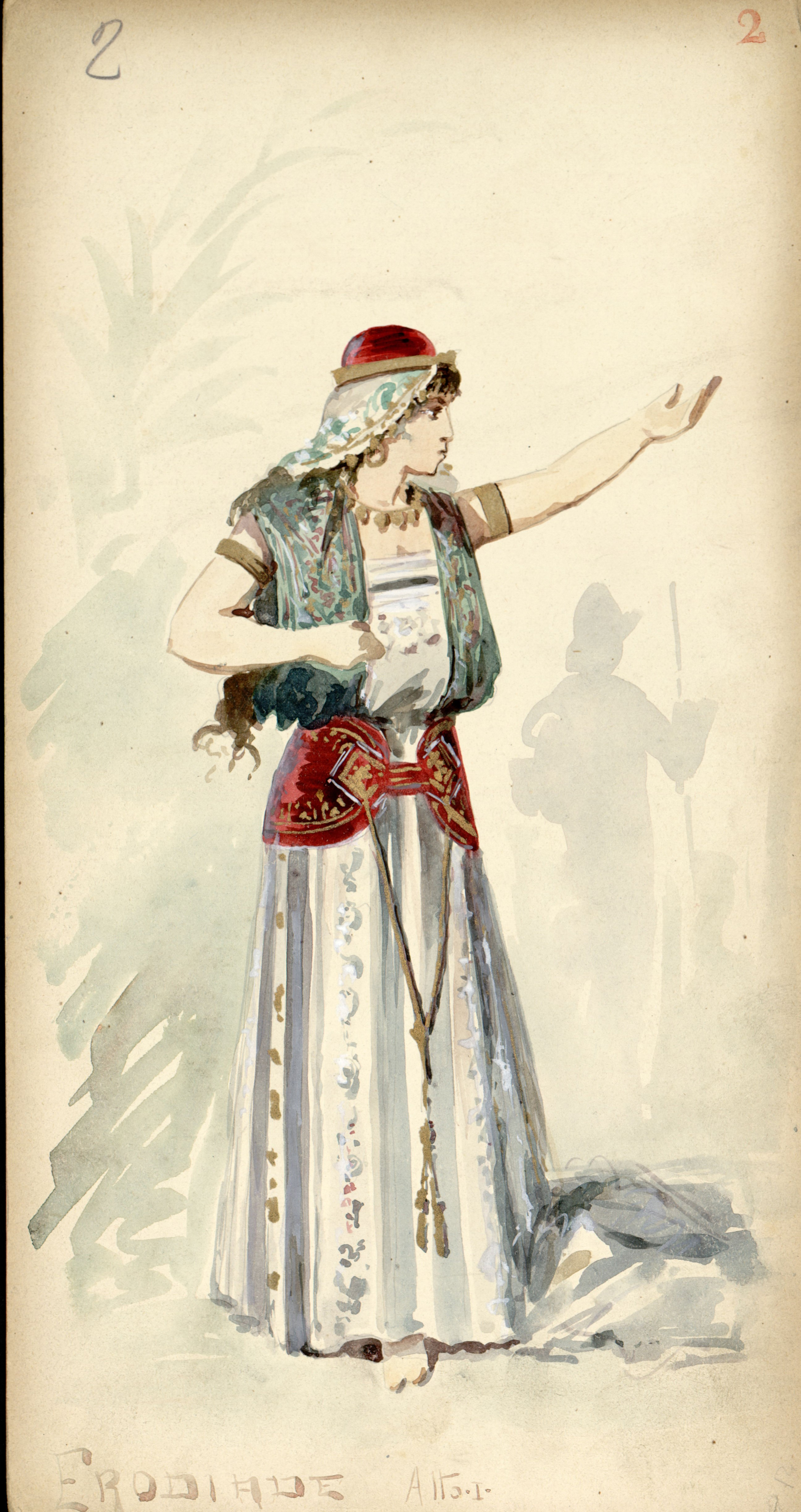
Costume design for Hérodiade act 1 (1882).

=== Act 1 ===
In a courtyard outside Hérode's palace in Jerusalem. After a short introduction merchants are seen arguing; they are calmed by Phanuel who urges co-operation with the Romans (Encore une dispute!).

Salomé enters, desperately seeking her mother, who she does not know but who abandoned her years ago. Salomé is also looking for the prophet Jean with whom she had found comfort in her absence from the city (Il est doux, il est bon).

Hérode has a passion for Salomé and comes from the palace (Elle a fui le palais, elle a quitté ces lieux). He is joined by his wife Hérodiade who asks him to act against Jean, who has insulted her (Venge-moi d'une suprême offense!); when Hérode, aware of Jean's following, refuses, she vows to be avenged by herself (Hérode! Ne me refuse pas!). As she curses the prophet, Jean himself enters and the royal pair withdraw in fear (Frappe donc!). Salomé vows her love to Jean but he only speaks of a greater love, and new faith (Calmez donc vos fureurs. Allez! Ne parlez pas d'offense).

=== Act 2 ===
First tableau: Hérode's chambers

Slaves dance in order to divert the sleepless Hérode. Hérode next takes a philtre which gives him visions of his Salomé (Vision fugitive). Phanuel tells the king that the people are calling for the Messiah and acclaim Jean. Hérode however is sure he will defeat the Romans and win his subjects over again.

Second tableau: The palace in Jerusalem

Hérode calls the people to arms against Jerusalem's Roman masters (Ô peuple, le moment est venu de te faire connaître). The Roman consul Vitellius appears and promises to respect the faith of the Israelites and open the temple (À mon approche quel trouble). Jean, preceded by a joyful crowd and followed by Salomé passes by (Hosannah!). Hérodiade notices the reaction of her husband at the sight of the young woman and accuses Jean of wanting to seize power.

=== Act 3 ===
First tableau: The house of Phanuel

Phanuel asks Heaven to say whether Jean is mortal or divine (Dors, ô cité perverse!). Hérodiade visits the priest and consults Phanuel who foresees great suffering (Ah! Phanuel!), while the queen refuses to recognize her daughter in the young woman (Si Dieu l'avait voulu!).

Second tableau: The Holy Temple

Jean has been arrested. Salomé arrives, exhausted, at the prison (Hérode, à toi ces palmes, à toi ces fleurs!). Hérode wishes to release Jean in exchange for help in getting the Galileans to help him fight the Romans (C'en est fait! La Judée appartient à Tibère!). Seeing Salomé, he declares his love (Demande au prisonnier qui revoit la lumière) but she rejects him, saying that she loves one who is greater and stronger than he (Que m'oses-tu dire?). Not knowing who she means, Hérode threatens Jean and Salomé with death.

The priests intercede with Vitellius and ask him to condemn Jean (Schemâh Israël! Adonaï eloheinou!), but the consul gives responsibility for the execution to Hérode (Achève donc ton œvre en condamnant un homme). Jean refuses to assist the king (Homme, quel est ton nom?). Salomé asks to share her fate with that of the prophet – at this Hérode realises whom she loves and condemns them both to death (C'est Dieu que l'on te nomme).

=== Act 4 ===
First tableau: A subterranean vault

Jean, awaiting death in prison questions his soul (Ne pouvant réprimer les élans de la foi) . Salomé joins him (Salomé...Jean!). Jean is led away to execution while Salomé is taken to the king, who has decided to pardon her (Quand nos jours s'éteindront comme une chaste flamme).

Second tableau: The great hall in the palace

Dances celebrate the Roman victory (Romains! Nous sommes Romains!). Salomé begs Hérodiade to allow her to die alongside Jean, as it was he who looked after her when her mother abandoned her (Pourquoi me retirer cette faveur suprême). Hérodiade remains silent (Ses pleurs ont calmé ma fureur!). The executioner announces the death of Jean. Salomé draws a dagger and tries to kill the queen, who cries out that she is her mother. In despair, Salomé stabs herself and curses Hérodiade.

== Noted arias ==
- Act 1 – Salomé: "Il est doux, il est bon"
- Act 2 – Hérodiade: "Ne me refuse pas"
- Act 2 – Hérode: "Vision fugitive"
- Act 3 – Salomé: "C'est Dieu que l'on te nomme"
- Act 4 – Jean: "Adieu donc, vains objets qui nous charment sur terre"

== Ballet suite ==
Massenet also created a ballet suite (his Suite No.1), based on the dances in the work.

== Recordings ==
- 1961: Jésus Etcheverry conducting the Orchestre Lyrique de Paris with Michèle Le Bris (Salomé), Denise Scharley (Hérodiade), Guy Chauvet (Jean), Robert Massard (Hérode), and Adrien Legros (Phanuel). (Accord Musidisc) (excerpts)
- 1963: Georges Prêtre conducting the Théâtre National de l'Opéra de Paris with Régine Crespin (Salomé), Rita Gorr (Hérodiade), Albert Lance (Jean), Michel Dens (Hérode), and Jacques Mars (Phanuel). (La Voix de son Maître) (excerpts)
- 1995: Michel Plasson conducting the Choeur et Orchestre du Capitole de Toulouse with Cheryl Studer (Salomé), Nadine Denize (Hérodiade), Ben Heppner (Jean), Thomas Hampson (Hérode), and José van Dam (Phanuel). (EMI)
- 1995: Valery Gergiev conducting the San Francisco Opera Orchestra and Chorus with Renée Fleming (Salomé), Dolora Zajick (Hérodiade), Plácido Domingo (Jean), Juan Pons (Hérode), Kenneth Cox (Phanuel). (Sony Classical)
- 2023: Enrique Mazzola conducting the Orchestra and Chorus of the Deutsche Oper Berlin with Nicole Car (Salomé), Clémentine Margaine (Hérodiade), Matthew Polenzani (Jean), Étienne Dupuis (Hérode), Marko Mimica (Phanuel). Final 1884 revision, complete (Naxos)

=== Ballet suite ===
- 1999: Jean-Yves Ossonce, conducting the New Zealand Symphony Orchestra. (Naxos 8.553124)
- 2012: Patrick Gallois conducting the Barcelona Symphony Orchestra. (Naxos 8.573123).
