= Borowno =

- Village
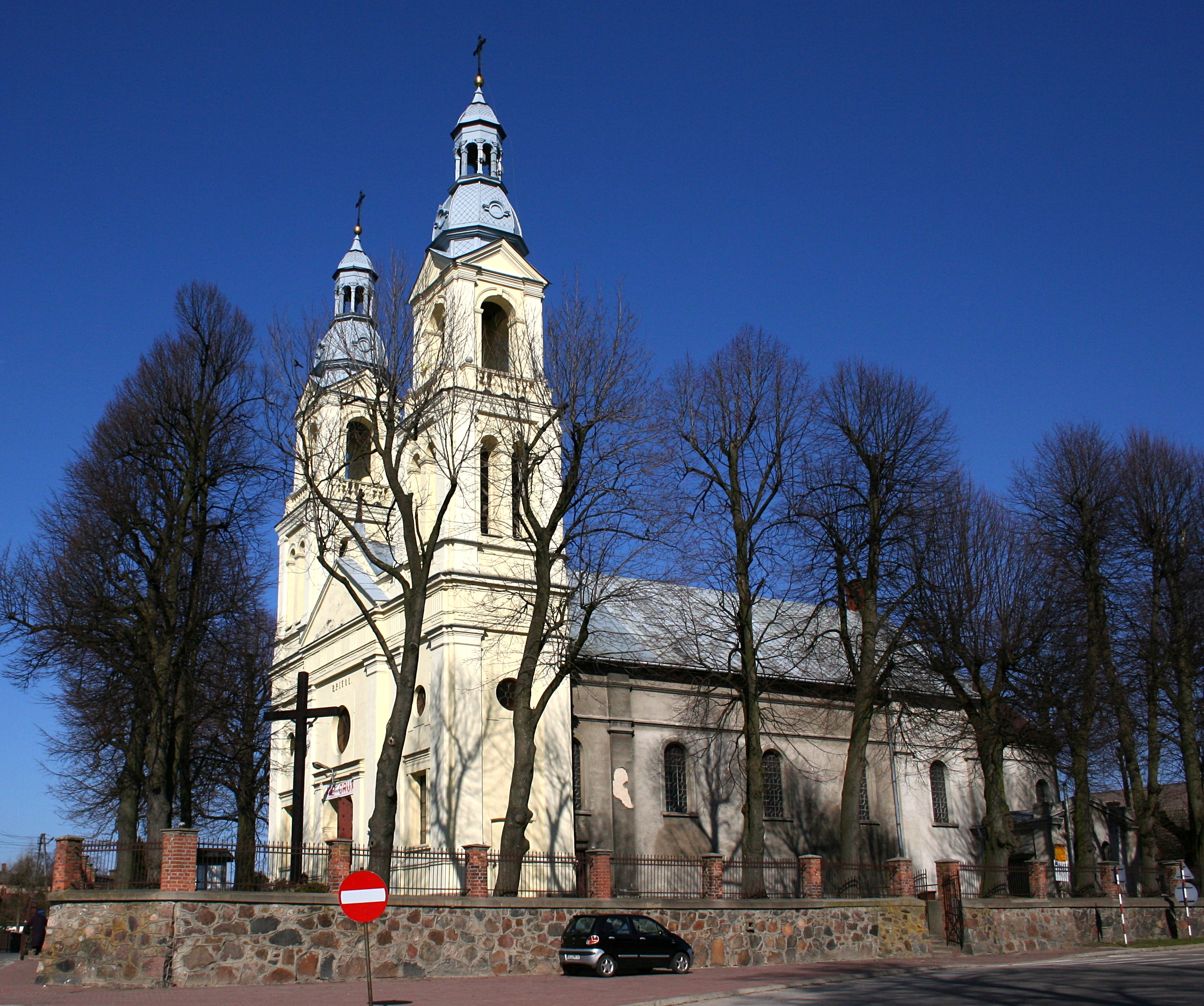

- Location within Poland
- Coordinates: 50°55′55″N 19°16′29″E
- Country: Poland
- Voivodeship: Silesian
- County: Częstochowa
- Gmina: Mykanów
- Population (approx.): 1,400

Borowno [bɔˈrɔvnɔ] is a village in the administrative district of Gmina Mykanów, within Częstochowa County, Silesian Voivodeship, in southern Poland.
