= Tornadoes of 2007 =

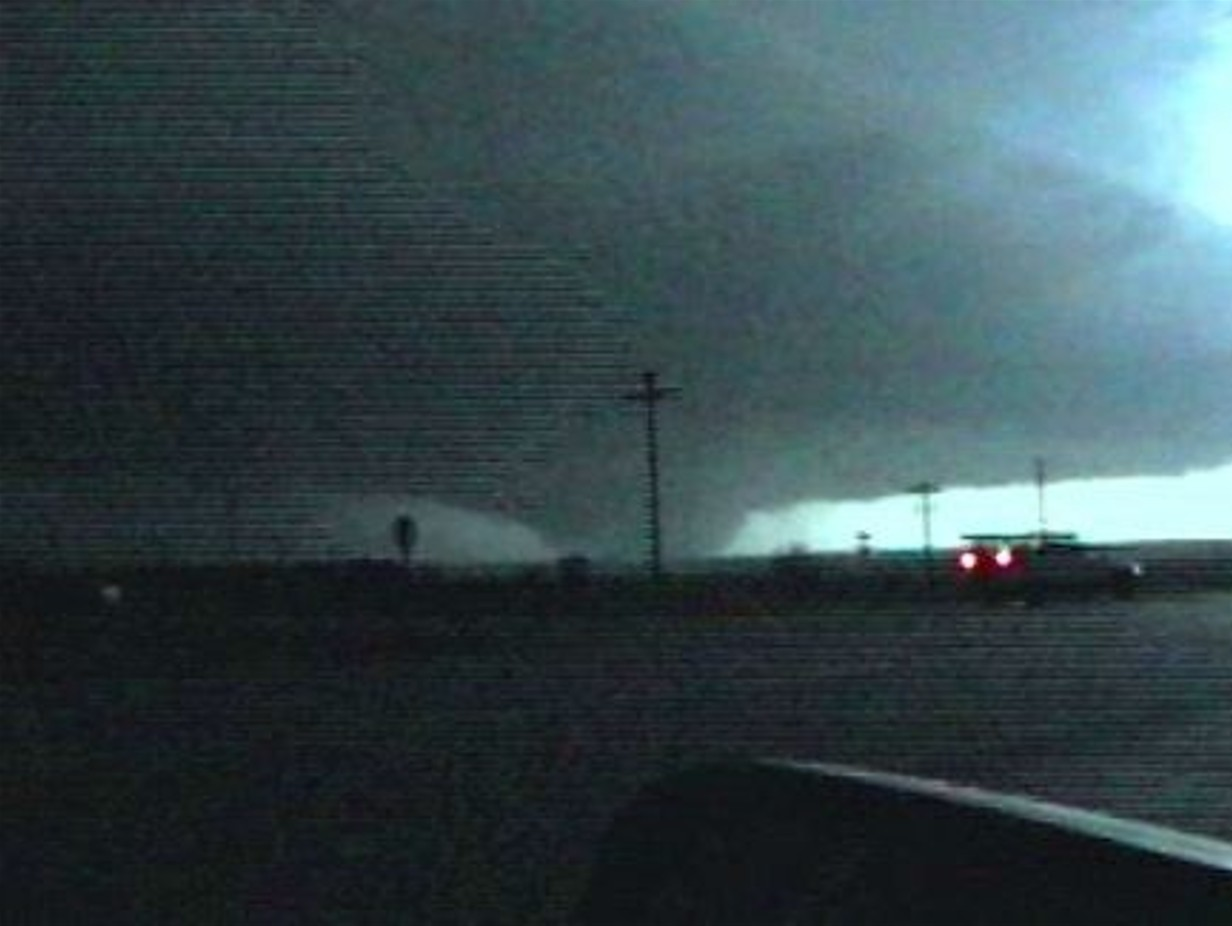
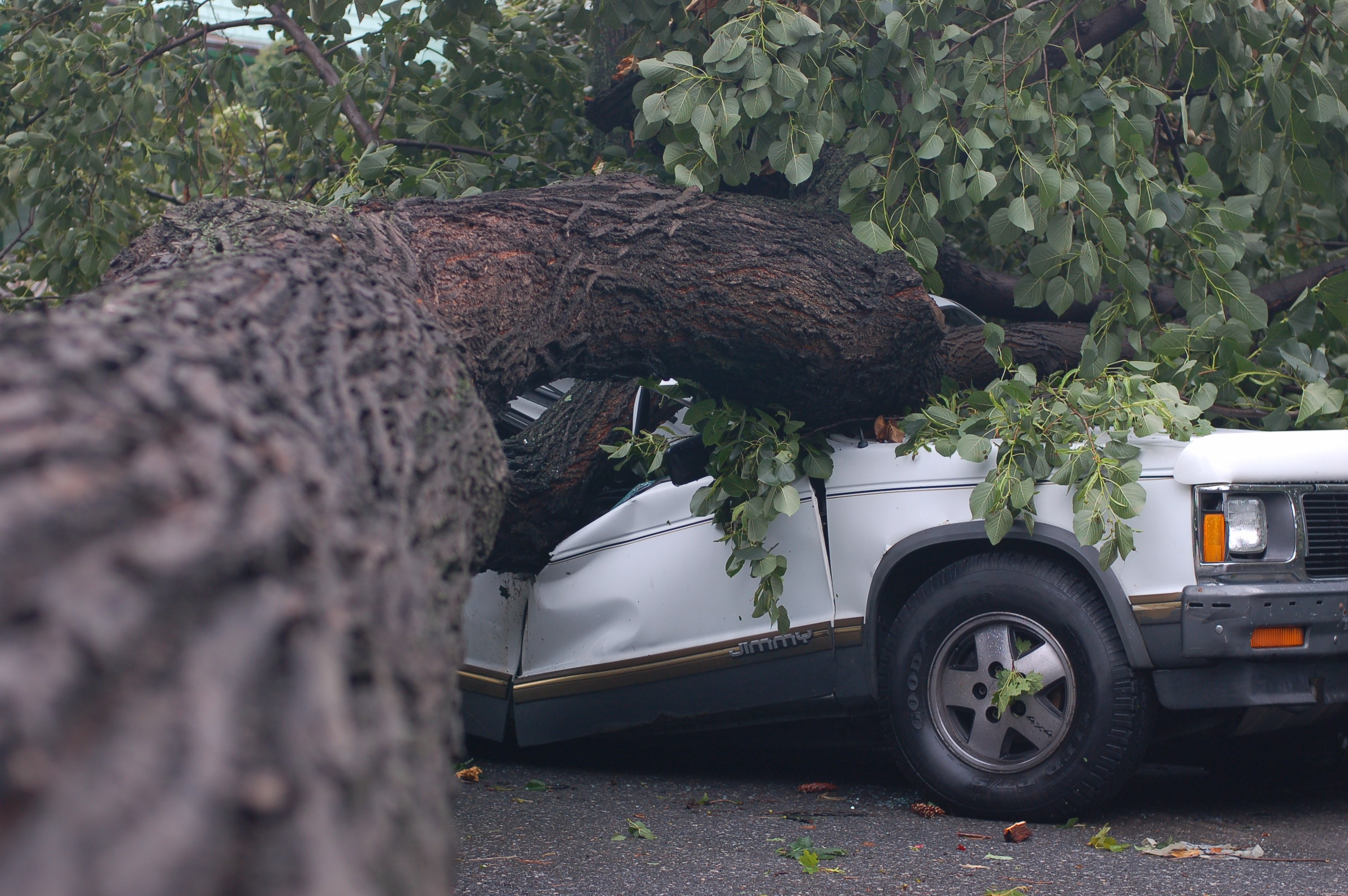
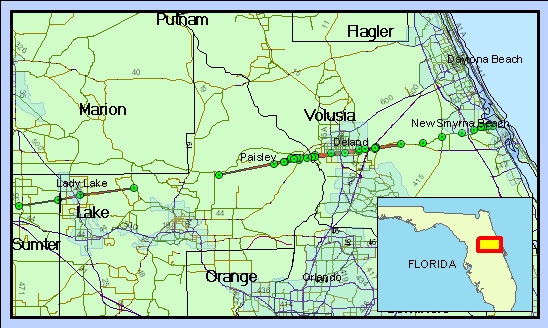
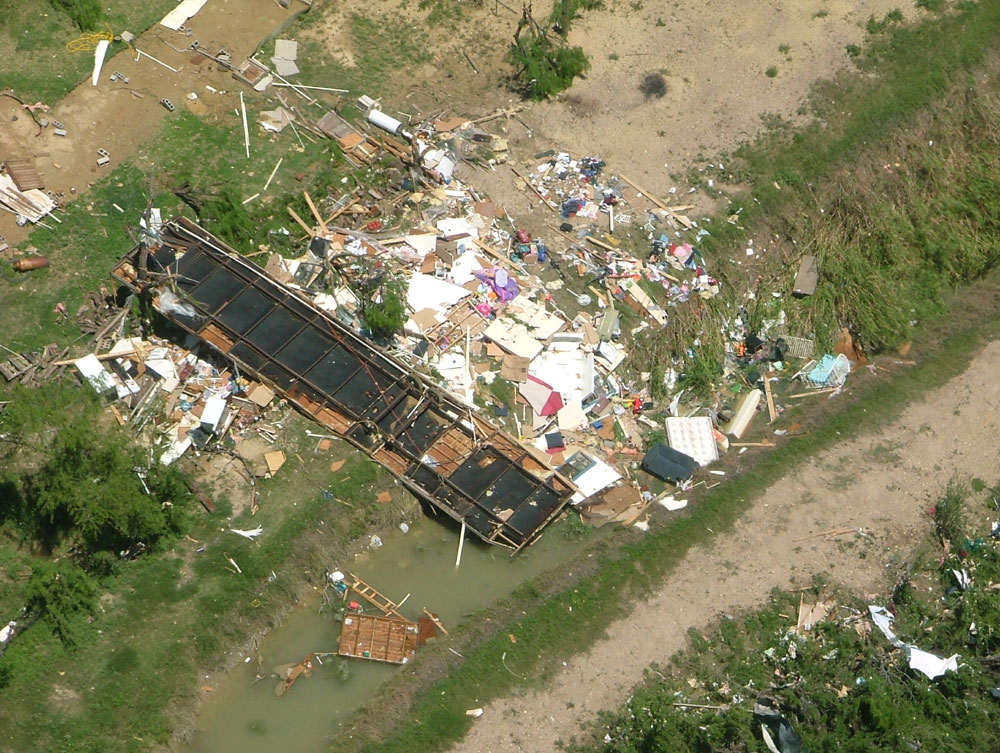
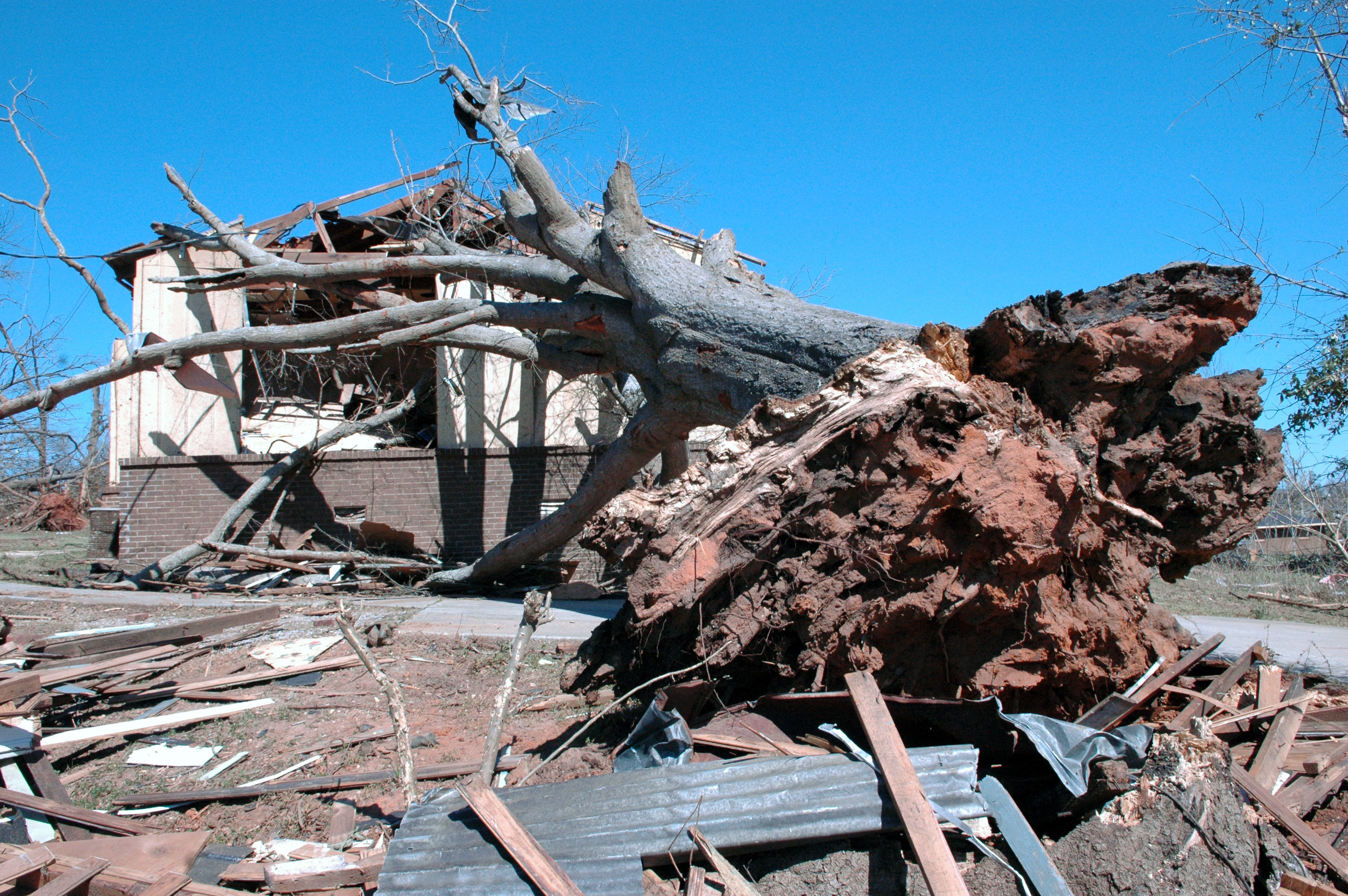
- Clockwise from top: An EF5 wedge tornado on Highway 148 in Kiowa County, Kansas, near the town of Greensburg on May 4; Tracks of tornadoes from the Groundhog Day tornado outbreak in Florida on February 2nd; A damaged home following an EF4 tornado in Enterprise, Alabama on March 1; An F5 tornado in Elie, Manitoba on June 22; A destroyed mobile home in Eagle Pass, Texas following an EF3 tornado on April 24; A car crushed by a tree after the EF2 Brooklyn tornado in New York on August 8.
- Timespan: January 4 - December 20, 2007
- Maximum rated tornado: EF5 tornado: Greensburg, Kansas on May 4; Elie, Manitoba on June 22 (F5)
- Tornadoes in U.S.: 1,097
- Damage (U.S.): $1.4 billion
- Fatalities (U.S.): 82
- Fatalities (worldwide): 145

This page documents the tornadoes and tornado outbreaks that occurred in 2007, primarily (but not entirely) in the United States. Most tornadoes form in the U.S., although some events may take place internationally, particularly in parts of neighboring southern Canada during the summer season. Some tornadoes also take place in Europe, e. g. in the United Kingdom or in Germany.

Preliminary reports suggest that there were 1,305 reported tornadoes in the U.S. (of which 1,097 were confirmed), with 82 confirmed fatalities. It was the deadliest year for tornadoes in the U.S. since 1999, when 95 deaths were reported. In addition, 25 fatalities took place in China, 23 in Chad, seven in Bangladesh, three each in Mexico and Vietnam, and one each in South Africa and the Philippines for a worldwide known total of at least 145.

Notably, the system for classifying tornado damage in the United States changed from the Fujita scale to the Enhanced Fujita Scale on February 1, 2007.

== Synopsis ==
2007 started quickly in terms of tornadoes, with the first tornado fatalities taking place in the first week of January. After few other significant events in the rest of January, a deadly period took place in the latter part of the winter. Two deadly outbreaks and several other major tornado events marred February and March, especially in the southern US.

The spring was also fairly active, with several significant tornado events in April and May, including a major outbreak in the first weekend of May that produced the first ever EF5 tornado, using the then-new Enhanced Fujita scale (as well as the first F5-equivalent tornado on any scale in the 21st century). While June was not as active, with fewer tornadoes, it produced Canada's first F5 tornado.

The tropics in the Western Hemisphere produced few significant tornadoes in 2007, but Typhoon Sepat produced a deadly tornado in China. Otherwise, the summer and early fall were fairly quiet, with a few local exceptions. The most severe outbreak in the second half of the year took place in October, when the largest outbreak ever recorded in that month took place.

The year ended slowly with no major outbreaks in November or December and only a few isolated tornadoes, mostly related to larger winter storms.

== Events ==
=== United States Yearly Total ===
Confirmed tornadoes by Enhanced Fujita rating
EFU	EF0	EF1	EF2	EF3	EF4	EF5	Total
0	674	300	91	27	4	1	1,097

- Note: January tornadoes were rated using the old Fujita scale, but are included in the chart above by matching the F rating to the related EF scale rating.
- Note: An F4 tornado from Mexico crossed into the United States, where that portion of the track was rated EF3. This is counted as an F4 tornado since it is one continuous tornado.

Fatal United States tornadoes in 2007
- Approximate touchdown location of killer tornadoes in 2007
Summary of tornadoes
- January 4 – Louisiana (2 deaths)
- February 2 – Florida (8 deaths)
- February 2 – Florida (13 deaths)
- February 13 – Louisiana (1 death)
- March 1 – Missouri (1 death)
- March 1 – Alabama (1 death)
- March 1 – Alabama (9 deaths)
- March 1 – Georgia (1 death)
- March 1 – Georgia (2 deaths)
- March 1 – Georgia (6 deaths)
- March 23 – New Mexico (2 deaths)
- March 28 – Texas, Oklahoma (2 deaths)
- March 28 – Colorado (2 deaths)
- March 28 – Texas (1 death)
- April 13 – Texas (1 death)
- April 15 – South Carolina (1 death)
- April 24 – Texas (7 deaths)
- May 4 – Kansas (12 deaths)
- May 4 – Kansas (1 death)
- May 4 – Kansas (1 death)
- May 5 – Kansas (1 death)
- August 26 – North Dakota (1 death)
- October 17 – Missouri (2 deaths)
- October 18 – Michigan (1 death)
- October 18 – Michigan (2 deaths)
- December 15 – Georgia (1 death)
Total fatalities: 82

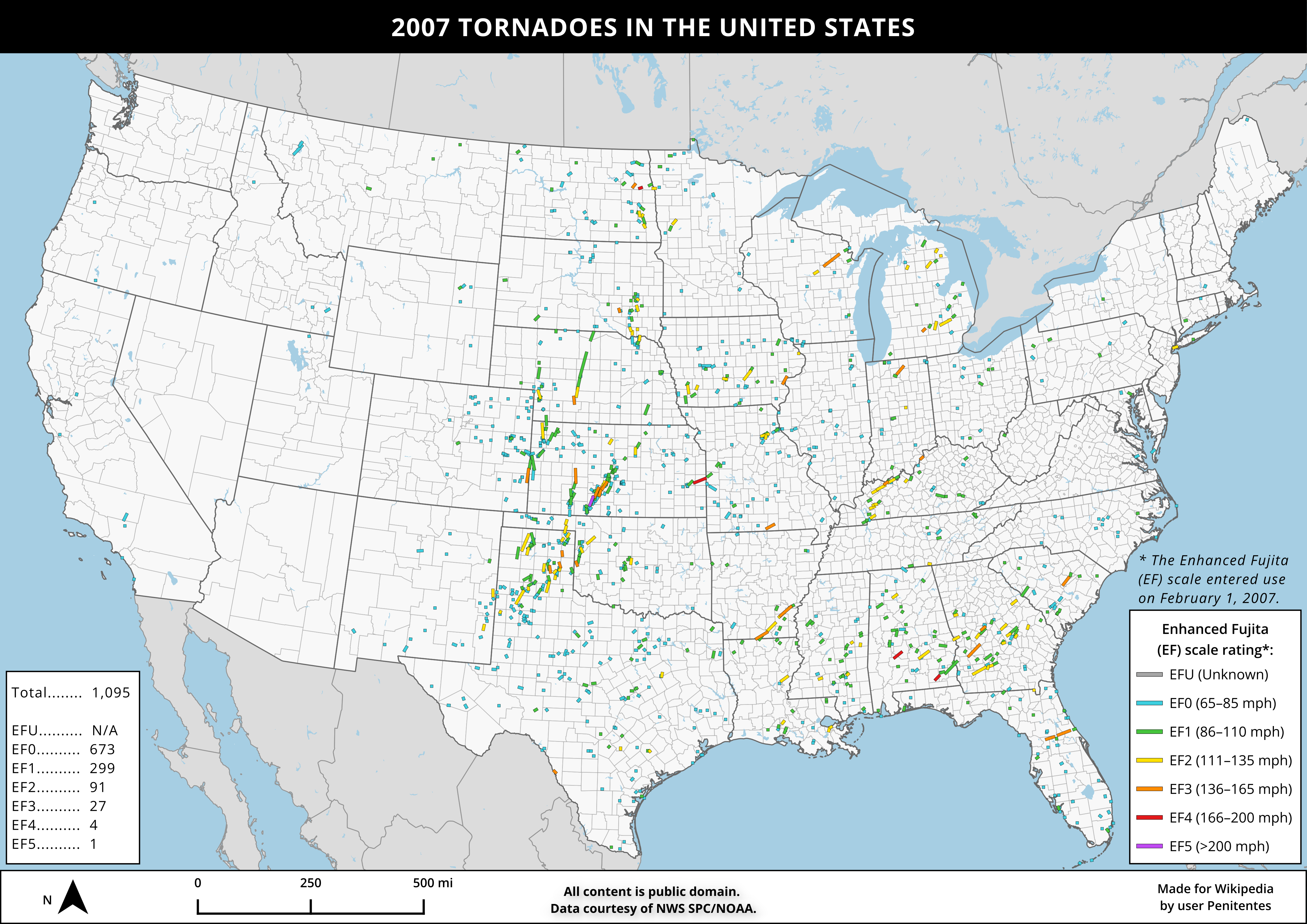
A map of 2007 United States tornado paths from the results of storm surveys.

Month	Number of confirmed tornadoes by month
January	21
February	52
March	171
April	165
May	250
June	128
July	69
August	73
September	51
October	87
November	7
December	19

== January ==
There were 29 tornadoes reported in the U.S. in January, of which 22 were confirmed.

=== January 1 (Indonesia) ===
The first Indonesia tornado of 2007 occurred on New Year's Day 2007, a waterspout touched down and went ashore causing damage in Anyer Beach and Cinangka, Serang, Banten. Several houses collapsed and several trees were downed. Nobody was hurt or killed by this tornado.

=== January 3 (Indonesia) ===
Just two days after the first Indonesia tornado, two separate tornadoes touched down in South Sulawesi. The first tornado touched down at 10 AM, damaging 7 houses and 2 rice factories in Jenetaesa village. The second tornado touched down at 2:30 PM destroying several houses. 12 houses were damaged in Batubasi Hamlet and 1 house in Bantimurung Hamlet, located in the Jenetaesa Village Simbang Sub-district. In the Bantimurung Sub-district, 18 houses were ruined by the tornado itself. 13 houses in both Malewang Hamlet and Mattoanging village were destroyed. 3 houses in Tokamaseang Village and 2 other houses in Baruga Village were damaged.

=== January 4–5 ===
FU	F0	F1	F2	F3	F4	F5
0	5	8	2	0	0	0

The first severe weather event of 2007 was a scattered but deadly tornado event in the U.S. Gulf Coast region on January 4. Two people were killed in New Iberia, Louisiana, and 15 were injured. It was confirmed to have been an F1 tornado as all the severe damage took place to mobile homes. At least four other tornadoes have been confirmed, including an F2 tornado near Blackwater, Mississippi that injured nine people.

The activity continued farther east into Georgia and the Carolinas on January 5, with at least one, and likely more, possible tornadoes. At least 15 people were injured in a tornado in Liberty, South Carolina.

=== January 13 ===
An F1 tornado struck southwest of San Marcos, Texas, causing severe structural damage. Although it wasn't very notable, it was the final tornado in the United States rated using the Fujita Scale.

=== January 17 (Indonesia) ===
The first tornado in Indonesia to cause injuries in 2007 touched down in Lainea Sub-district, South Konawe District, Southeast Sulawesi Province causing damage to 210 houses and 2 people were injured when their house collapsed on top of them. The worst damage was in Laeya Village, Lanea District, South Konawe District where 20 houses were flattened.

=== January 18 (Europe) ===
FU	F0	F1	F2	F3	F4	F5
0	0	1	2	3	0	0

The cold front of severe winter storm "Kyrill" spawned tornadoes in Germany, three of which were confirmed as of February 22. The first one caused severe damage in the city of Lutherstadt Wittenberg, Saxony-Anhalt. It hit at about 6:40 p.m. local time (1740 UTC). Roofs were blown away and trees virtually torn apart. It is estimated to have been an F2 or F3 tornado. Two more tornadoes were confirmed from Brandenburg—one T6/F3 tracked through Brachwitz and Kemnitz, two small villages 60 kilometres (37 mi) southwest of Berlin. The strongest tornado that day, T7/F3, took place in Lauchhammer in southern Brandenburg, which leveled massively built barns and snapped high tension poles. This tornado tracked a distance of about 34 kilometres (21 mi).

More tornadoes were confirmed from Poland. In the late evening hours, a T3/F1 tornado struck a forest area near Silna in Lubuskie region (western Poland). Furthermore, two other tornadoes struck the village of Czermin near Wrocław and the small town of Andrespol near Lódz in central Poland. The confirmed intensity of the Andrespol-Tornado was T4/F2.

=== January 23 (Indonesia) ===
A tornado hit Cilegon. 23 permanent buildings collapsed in Kampung Langon Baru Mekarsari market, Cilegon Banten.

== February ==
There were 87 tornadoes reported in the U.S. in February, of which 54 were confirmed.

February 1, 2007 marked the changeover from the Fujita Scale to the Enhanced Fujita Scale.

=== February 2 ===
EFU	EF0	EF1	EF2	EF3	EF4	EF5
0	1	1	0	2	0	0

In the early morning hours of February 2, four separate tornadoes ran across Central Florida. The most severe damage occurred in Lake County, where 21 people were killed. Two of the tornadoes were rated EF3 on the new Enhanced Fujita scale. Damage from the tornadoes totaled to US$204 million. These tornadoes were the very first to be classified under the newly implemented Enhanced Fujita scale in the United States.

=== February 13 ===
EFU	EF0	EF1	EF2	EF3	EF4	EF5
0	7	9	3	0	0	0

Beginning in the late evening hours of February 12 and overnight into February 13, 19 tornadoes touched down across southern Louisiana and Mississippi. The most significant were around Lafayette, Louisiana and in Greater New Orleans. Some of the tornadoes produced significant damage, including an EF2 tornado in the Gentilly neighborhood of New Orleans that killed one woman and left dozens injured. A separate EF2 tornado caused major damage in other parts of the city as well.

More tornadoes developed across Alabama in the late afternoon on February 13, with several reports of damage across the state.

Damages from the tornadoes totaled to US$8.32 million.

=== February 23–24 ===
EFU	EF0	EF1	EF2	EF3	EF4	EF5
0	6	9	3	2	0	0

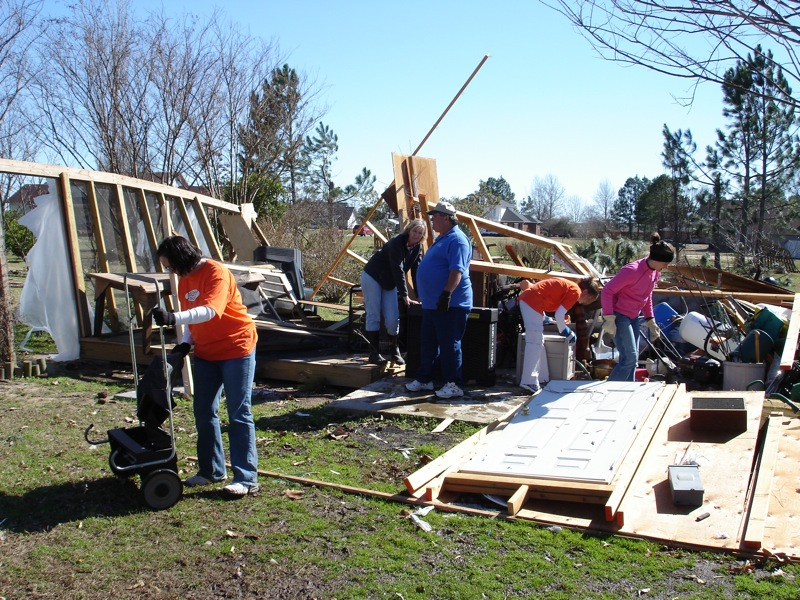
Cleanup after the tornado in Dumas, Arkansas.

A moderate severe weather event and tornado outbreak took place on February 23 and 24 across the south-central United States. It was expected to have been much larger on February 23, as a moderate risk of severe weather was issued by the Storm Prediction Center for both days over large areas. The activity on February 23 was quite modest due to a late start and low dew points. The area primarily affected was the southern High Plains. Three weak tornadoes touched down in Kansas, along with one in Texas that day.

Tornado activity the following day was much more significant, especially in Arkansas. An EF3 passed near the town of Strong, Arkansas, heavily damaging homes and mobile homes. A brick house was mostly destroyed, and a double-wide mobile home was completely destroyed, with debris scattered up to 200 yards away. 5 people were injured. An EF2 tornado struck the Mt. Olive community in Bradley County a short time later. A house suffered major damage and a mobile home was destroyed there. An elderly woman was injured in the house, and a family of five was injured in the mobile home. Three other homes had minor damage, and several sheds and outbuildings were destroyed. Thousands of trees were blown down, as were a number of power poles and power lines. A second EF3 tornado formed and tore directly through the town of Dumas, where 25 businesses were destroyed, along with 19 homes. More than 65 additional homes sustained minor to moderate damage. Six mobile homes were destroyed, along with an athletic park. A community building sustained major damage, as well as a 20-unit assisted living center. An electrical substation was destroyed, leaving the area without power for several days. Numerous trees and power lines were also blown down. Farther to the northeast, in the community of Back Gate, 11 mobile homes were destroyed and 12 sustained minor damage. One house was destroyed, along with three that were damaged. This tornado injured a total of 28 people along its path. After the Dumas tornado dissipated, an EF2 tornado touched down and passed north of Monticello before dissipating near Garrett Bridge. That tornado snapped hundreds of trees, damaged or destroyed several shop buildings and a barn, partially destroyed one house and damaged another. Further south, two EF2 tornadoes touched down in Louisiana. Overall, the outbreak resulted in 20 tornadoes and no fatalities. Damages from the tornadoes totaled to US$48.41 million.

=== February 28 – March 2 ===
EFU	EF0	EF1	EF2	EF3	EF4	EF5
0	22	20	9	3	3	0

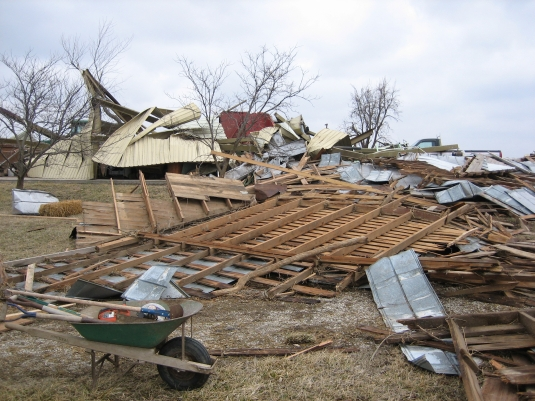
Extensive tornado damage in Eastern Kansas on February 28, 2007.

A large storm system spawned a significant tornado outbreak, which began February 28 in Kansas and Missouri and continued March 1 in Alabama and Georgia. On February 28, a moderate risk was issued for both days, and on March 1 a high risk was issued for western Alabama, eastern Mississippi, the Florida Panhandle and southern and central Georgia. It was the first such issuance since April 7, 2006.

On February 28, ten tornadoes occurred, seven in Kansas, two in Missouri, and one in Florida. One tornado, the first to be rated EF4 under the Enhanced Fujita Scale, destroyed a house in Linn County, Kansas. Structural damage was also reported near Adrian, Missouri, from a different tornado. Hail as large as baseballs were also reported.

On March 1 and into the morning of March 2, 47 tornadoes occurred from Missouri to the East Coast. Significant damage was reported from an EF3 tornado near Caulfield, Missouri, and one person was killed in a mobile home there. In the early afternoon, supercells became widespread across the region. An EF4 tornado in Enterprise, Alabama heavily damaged several homes and Enterprise High School, killing nine people when the roof of the school collapsed. One other person was killed in another EF4 tornado in Wilcox County, Alabama. Nine fatalities occurred in Georgia, including six in a single EF2 tornado in Baker County. A total of 57 tornadoes were confirmed during the outbreak, which killed 20. This outbreak was part of a winter storm that affected the Midwest states, the Great Lakes, Quebec, Ontario, the Canadian Maritimes and the Northeast United States, killing an additional 19 people.

Damages from the tornadoes totaled to greater than US$580 million.

== March ==
There were 214 tornadoes reported in the U.S. in March, of which 172 were confirmed.

=== March 3 (South Africa) ===
A tornado killed one and injured 350 in the suburbs of Klerksdorp, South Africa.

=== March 23–24 ===
EFU	EF0	EF1	EF2	EF3	EF4	EF5
0	21	2	3	0	0	0

A damaging outbreak of 18 tornadoes impacted areas from southwestern Texas northward into east-central New Mexico and the Oklahoma Panhandle. At the beginning of the outbreak an EF1 tornado struck Logan, New Mexico, tossing and/or rolling about 50 manufactured homes and recreational vehicles resulting in 12 injuries. Later, an EF2 tornado west of both McDonald and Tatum snapped power poles and threw a heavy water trough several hundred yards. The worst tornado of the day was another destructive EF2 tornado that moved directly through Clovis, damaging or destroying over 500 homes and other structures, killing two, and injuring 33 others. This was the first tornado to result in fatalities since October 1974 and tied the tornado with another tornado in Wagon Mound on May 31, 1930, for the deadliest tornado in state history. The last tornado of the day was another EF2 tornado west of Morton, Texas that destroyed irrigation systems, partially destroyed the Star Route Gin, and snapped utility poles. Isolated severe storms refired the next day from the Texas Panhandle northward into western and north central Nebraska. Mainly hail damage occurred, but eight weak tornadoes did touch down. In all, 26 tornadoes touched down, resulting in two fatalities and 45 injuries.

=== March 28–31 ===
EFU	EF0	EF1	EF2	EF3	EF4	EF5
0	44	22	10	5	0	0

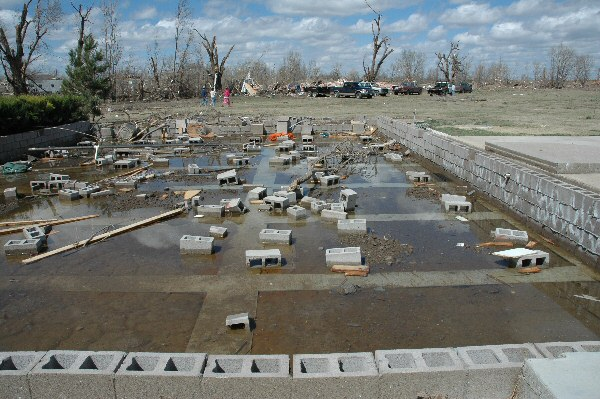
Demolished home in Holly, Colorado on March 28, 2007

A slow-moving system developed across the High Plains on the dry line on March 28. A moderate risk of severe weather was issued by the Storm Prediction Center as widespread severe weather, including tornadoes, were expected throughout the afternoon and evening. In all, 65 tornadoes were reported in the region, with several destructive and large tornadoes taking place in numerous communities across the region. Many other severe weather reports came in, including hail as large as softballs. An EF2 tornado killed two people Beaver County, Oklahoma, an EF3 tornado killed two people in Holly, Colorado, and another EF3 tornado killed a person in Hemphill County, Texas.

The system gradually moved east on March 29, but the squall line left over from events the previous night prevented a major outbreak. Even so, three tornadoes were reported in Oklahoma, two in the Oklahoma City metropolitan area, including an EF2 tornado that injured five people between Yukon and Piedmont.

The SPC had issued a moderate risk again for March 30 and March 31 over portions of southern Texas. Several tornadoes were reported across the Midwest and Southern Plains. Near, Halletsville, four people were injured when their mobile home was obliterated by a low-end EF2 tornado. An EF0 tornado also hit midtown St. Louis, causing damage to roofs, trees and signs including parts of a billboard sign that flew over and blocked Interstate 64, where two people were injured by flying debris. In all, the outbreak produced 81 tornadoes, killing five people and injuring 26 others.

== April ==
There were 187 tornadoes reported in the U.S. in April, of which 167 were confirmed.

=== April 3–4 ===
EFU	EF0	EF1	EF2	EF3	EF4	EF5
0	8	7	0	0	0	0

Another severe weather outbreak took place on April 3. However, damaging hail and wind were the primary effects, although 10 tornadoes were reported in Texas, Tennessee, Kentucky, Arkansas and Alabama. Nearly 400 reports of hail were reported throughout the day with the majority occurring during the afternoon hours in Missouri, Illinois, Arkansas and Kentucky with also reports of golf ball to baseball size hail. The majority of the wind reports were from a bow echo that developed across central Kentucky and Tennessee during the evening hours and causing damage to trees, power lines, antennas and trailers. A total of 10 tornadoes were confirmed; all of them were EF0 or EF1. No fatalities were reported, but several people were injured.

Damages from the tornadoes totaled to US$2.73 million.

=== April 11 ===
EFU	EF0	EF1	EF2	EF3	EF4	EF5
0	3	5	1	0	0	0

A severe weather outbreak occurred across the eastern central states on April 11, exactly 42 years after the deadly 1965 Palm Sunday tornado outbreak. The system spanned from Illinois and Indiana down to the southern states spawning seven tornadoes, four in Indiana (two rated EF0, one rated EF1 and one rated EF2) and 3 in Alabama (all rated EF1). The system also created damaging winds and a great amount of hail.

=== April 13–15 ===
EFU	EF0	EF1	EF2	EF3	EF4	EF5
0	15	16	4	1	0	0

On April 13, severe weather developed across the Southern Plains, with the first storms affecting north-central Texas. The Storm Prediction Center issued a high risk over North Central and Northeast Texas, Southern Arkansas and Northern Louisiana. It was also issued for the central Gulf Coast for April 14. During the mid-afternoon hours, the moderate risk was upgraded to a high risk for the second time in 2007. A couple of tornadoes touched down across parts of the Dallas-Fort Worth Metroplex. Hail as large as 3.25 inches (8.3 cm) and wind gusts up to 80 miles per hour (130 km/h) were reported as well. Two tornadoes, one rated EF0 and another rated EF1, were later confirmed in Tarrant County near Fort Worth while another EF0 tornado was confirmed in Dallas County and a third EF0 tornado in Rockwall County. The EF1 tornado in Tarrant County resulted in a fatality. The severe weather caused cancellation of qualifying for the 2007 Samsung 500 at Texas Motor Speedway, forcing the field to be established via owner's points. Nonetheless, the overall activity was much lower than expected and the high risk busted.

For April 14, the Storm Prediction Center issued a moderate risk of severe weather for southern Louisiana, Mississippi, Alabama, Georgia and northwestern Florida. Several more scattered tornadoes were reported.

While most of the activity on April 15 was straight-line winds, an isolated EF3 tornado touched down in Sumter County, South Carolina that morning. Several mobile homes were demolished and one person was killed, with three injured. Two other tornadoes were later confirmed in South Carolina: an EF1 tornado in Lee County and an EF0 tornado in Orangeburg County. Several tornadoes also affected Georgia where at least 8 tornadoes and three injuries were documented.

=== April 20–27 ===
EFU	EF0	EF1	EF2	EF3	EF4	EF5
0	61	23	6	1	0	0

FU	F0	F1	F2	F3	F4	F5
0	0	0	0	0	1	0

An eight-day outbreak of tornado activity struck a large portion of the United States, with an additional violent tornado in Mexico. The event started on April 20, when two isolated, but strong tornadoes touched down in south central Nebraska. An EF3 tornado struck several farms in rural Frontier and Lincoln counties, injuring two in the latter county. The same supercell than produced a large, wedge EF2 tornado that blew several vehicles and semis off of Interstate 80 near Gothenburg, injuring nine people, before causing more damage to farms in rural Dawson and Custer counties. More severe weather occurred the next day from the Texas Panhandle northward to northeastern Colorado northeastward into Minnesota. Five EF2 tornadoes touched down in the Texas Panhandle, causing severe damage along there paths. The towns of Olton, Cactus, and Tulia were especially hit hard, and 17 people were injured. Only isolated severe weather activity occurred on April 22 with only one tornado being confirmed.

Severe weather outbreaks occurred over the next two days with a moderate risk being issued for April 23 and a rare high risk issued for April 24. Although most of the tornadoes that occurred remained over open terrain, several destructive tornadoes did touch down, especially on April 24. On that day, a tornadic thunderstorm developed in northeast Coahuila, Mexico and produced a violent F4 tornado that killed seven people in Piedras Negras. The same tornado then crossed the international border into the United States and caused EF3 damage in Eagle Pass, Texas, killing three more people. Isolated tornadic activity occurred on April 25, but a non-tornadic fatality occurred in Lake Village, Arkansas when 60 miles per hour (97 km/h) winds capsized a boat on Lake Chicot. More tornadoes occurred on April 26–27. Although they were all weak in nature, all but one of them caused minor to moderate damage. The worst of these tornadoes was an EF1 tornado in New Tazewell, Tennessee that damaged or destroyed mobile homes while also damaging other homes and trees, injuring seven people.

In all, 93 tornadoes touched down, with 10 tornadic fatalities, one non-tornadic fatality, and at least 37 injuries being confirmed.

== May ==
282 tornadoes were reported in the US in May, of which 251 were confirmed.

=== May 1 (Siberia) ===
On May 1, a tornado hit the village of Vershinino in the central region of Tomsk (Tomsk Oblast) in central-southern Siberia. Some roofs were blown away and destroyed, windows were smashed and power lines as well as telephone lines were seriously damaged. An eyewitness reported that her child was whirled around as the tornado struck their street area. No one was seriously injured or killed. According to a damage report, this tornado was rated F2.

=== May 2 (Chad) ===
A tornado near N'djamena, Chad destroyed 50 homes, killed nine people, and injured over 100.

=== May 2 ===
EFU	EF0	EF1	EF2	EF3	EF4	EF5
0	6	4	0	0	0	0

On the afternoon of May 2, supercells developed across several parts of Texas. A total of 10 tornadoes were reported, including two in the city of El Paso, however, the damage was relatively minor. Tornado watches were spread throughout Texas. However, the supercells redeveloped into a hybrid derecho across Central and North Texas that evening, stretching from the Dallas-Fort Worth Metroplex to south of Waco and extending eastward to about Longview. Widespread wind damage with winds in excess of 100 miles per hour (160 km/h) were reported. In the Metroplex, more than 300,000 customers lost power as a result of the high winds. Some of the most severe damage included the loss of a roof at an apartment complex, extensive tree and power line damage (with many trees crashing into houses) and flipped tractor-trailers and mobile homes. However, no fatalities were reported. Two EF0 tornadoes were also confirmed in New Mexico, one of which was a landspout that was on the ground for 52 minutes.

=== May 4–6 ===
EFU	EF0	EF1	EF2	EF3	EF4	EF5
0	66	42	15	5	0	1

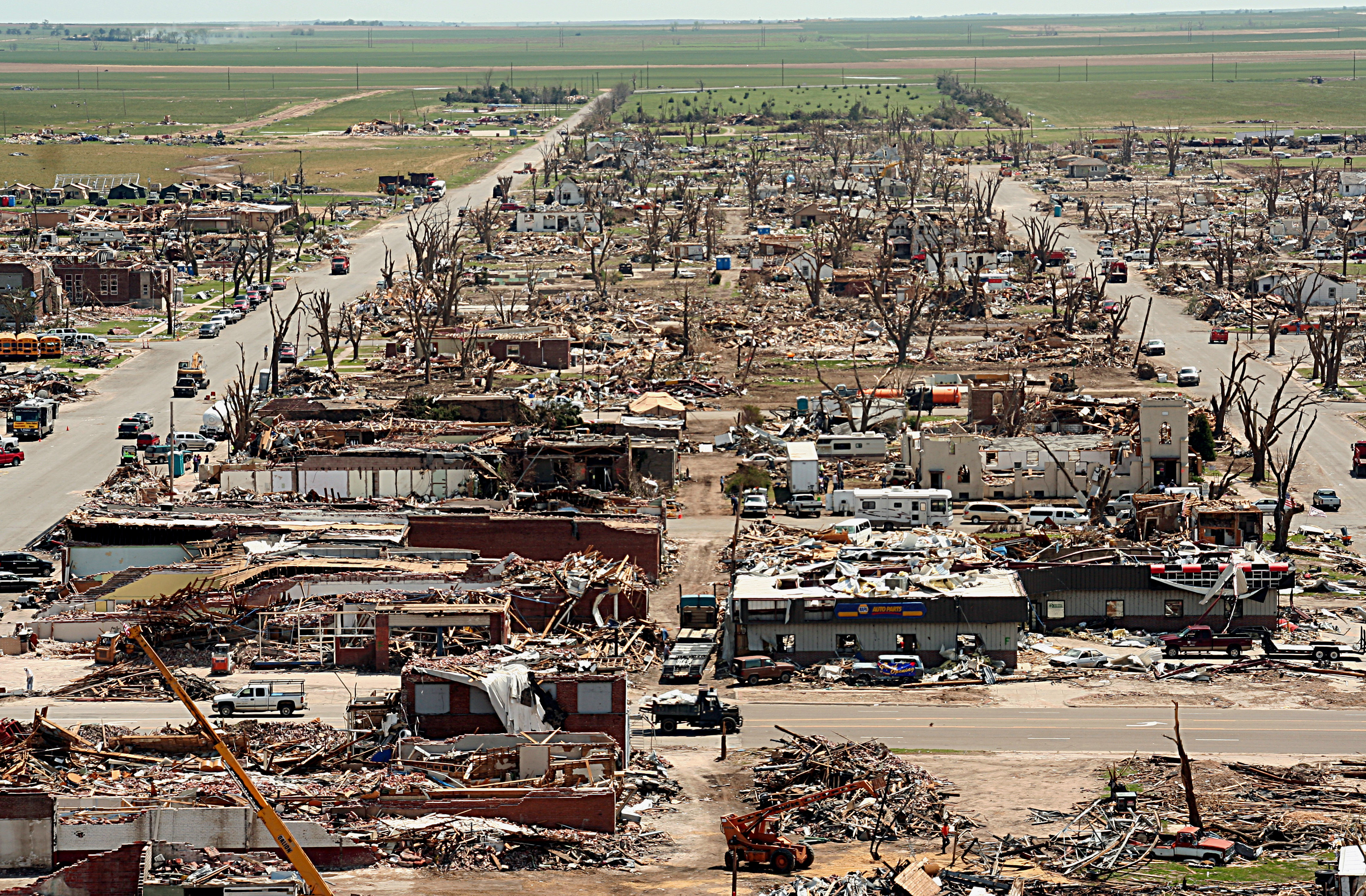
The center of Greensburg, Kansas, 12 days after being hit by an EF5 tornado.

A significant severe weather event developed across the central Plains on the evening of May 4. Early in the morning, The Storm Prediction Center issued a moderate risk of severe thunderstorms for May 4 over portions of Central Nebraska, Western Kansas, Western Oklahoma, Eastern Colorado and portions of the Texas Panhandle. Around 6:35 pm CDT (2335 UTC), a tornado was reported by KWTV storm spotters on the ground near Arnett, Oklahoma. The tornado stayed in mostly sparsely populated rural areas, but there were reports of a house 7 miles (11 km) west of Arnett being hit. At around 9:50 pm CDT (0250 UTC), there was a violent and destructive tornado in southwest Kansas near Greensburg. City administrator Steve Hewitt said that 90% of Greensburg was destroyed and at least 16 people were critically injured, according to Fox. In all, 12 people died and 63 were injured according to the National Weather Service and CNN. The tornado was rated an EF5 on the Enhanced Fujita Scale, the first since the new scale was implemented and the first F5 or EF5 tornado since the Bridge Creek-Moore tornado during the 1999 Oklahoma tornado outbreak on May 3, 1999. Another person was killed when a tornado destroyed structures in Ottawa County, Kansas, and another died in Stafford County, Kansas for an outbreak total of 14.

On the morning of May 5, the Storm Prediction Center issued a high risk across central Kansas and Nebraska. The Storm Prediction Center also issued a moderate risk for southern South Dakota and northwest Oklahoma and a slight risk for most of Oklahoma, northern South Dakota, southern North Dakota, eastern Nebraska, western Iowa and northeastern Colorado. Severe weather reports were already coming in by late morning, and the first tornado reports came in during the early afternoon hours. The most intense activity took place during the late afternoon and evening hours as supercells developed along a long line from South Dakota to North Texas. Over 80 tornadoes were confirmed that day, along with hail as large as softballs and straight–line winds as strong as 90 mph (145 km/h). The activity weakened in the late evening, but not before the last tornadoes were reported in Iowa in the overnight hours. The SPC also issued a moderate risk for severe storms over parts of central Kansas and northern Oklahoma on May 6. The activity was far less than on the two previous days, however there were still several additional tornadoes across the Plains, all of which were weak, mostly EF0 intensity.

=== May 8 (Dominican Republic) ===
At least fifteen people, most of them soldiers, were injured and dozens of homes were destroyed by a tornado that hit the Dominican province of Dajabón. Among the injured are thirteen soldiers who were on duty at the Dominican-Haitian border and three civilians, according to data provided by health and relief authorities in Dajabón, 295 kilometers northwest of the capital. The injured were taken to the Matías Ramón Mella hospital in the province. The tornado occurred around 5:30 p.m. and was accompanied by heavy rain and hail. Dozens of trees and power poles were knocked down by the tornado, which has made traffic impossible in the town of Dajabón. Relief agencies said they did not have specific statistics on the damage caused by the phenomenon. In towns near Dajabón such as Clavellina, La Aviación and Lajas, the tornado damaged dozens of homes, caused flooding and buried agricultural plots. Authorities estimate that 70 percent of the power lines were damaged, leaving the area without power. The tornado could have likely been an EF2, with RD$150 million (Approximately 2.405.774 US dollars) on damage.

=== May 9 (Northern Ireland) ===
FU	F0	F1	F2	F3	F4	F5
1	0	1	0	0	0	0

A tornado struck Carrickfergus, Northern Ireland (United Kingdom) resulting in roof damage and vehicle damage. There was one injury in the second tornado in five months to strike eastern Northern Ireland. The tornado of Carrickfergus was rated T2/F1.

=== May 9 (Chad) ===
A strong tornado struck Bébédjia, Chad, destroying roughly 95% of the town and killing 14 people. Another tornado just hours later worsened the damage.

=== May 11 (Poland and Ireland) ===
EFU	EF0	EF1	EF2	EF3	EF4	EF5
2	0	1	0	0	0	0

During the late afternoon hours, two tornadoes struck eastern Poland. One of them hit the small villages of Chodorówka Stara and Kopciówka near Suchowola in Podlaskie (north-eastern Poland). The F1 tornado caused serious damage to roofs of houses and barns. The second tornado struck the village of Opole Lubelskie in Lubelskie (eastern Poland), destroying a circus tent. Up to 40 people were injured, most of them were children, who watched a circus show as the tornado struck the area. A tornado also hit the areas of Dunboyne and Ashbourne in County Meath (eastern Ireland) and caused light damage to roofs in this area.

=== May 21–23 ===
EFU	EF0	EF1	EF2	EF3	EF4	EF5
0	22	3	2	0	0	0

On May 21, four tornadoes were reported in North Dakota and Nebraska. On May 22, the Storm Prediction Center issued a slight risk of severe weather for portions of South Dakota, Nebraska and Kansas. Environment Canada also issued a slight risk of severe weather for northwestern Ontario near the Minnesota border. Eight tornadoes were reported in northwestern Kansas. On the afternoon of May 22, the Storm Prediction Center issued a moderate risk of severe storms for parts of western Oklahoma, southern Kansas, and the northern Texas Panhandle for May 23. Significant EF2-EF5 tornadoes were possible inside the moderate risk area. On May 23, 10 tornadoes were reported along with hail as large as softballs.

== June ==
152 tornadoes were reported in the US in June, of which 128 were confirmed.

=== June 1 ===
EFU	EF0	EF1	EF2	EF3	EF4	EF5
0	6	2	3	1	0	0

A sudden string of supercells developed across eastern Iowa early in the afternoon of June 1 and tracked into northwestern Illinois and southwestern Wisconsin. The hardest hit communities were Muscatine, Iowa where widespread structural damage was reported, including businesses destroyed and injuries. Most of Grandview, Iowa was sealed off due to the extensive damage it sustained from the tornado. Houses were flattened in Grandview and people were reported trapped by the EF3 tornado. A second nearby tornado, rated EF2, also left significant damage around Bellevue, Iowa. No fatalities were reported.

=== June 6–8 (U.S. and Canada) ===
EFU	EF0	EF1	EF2	EF3	EF4	EF5
0	10	4	2	1	0	0

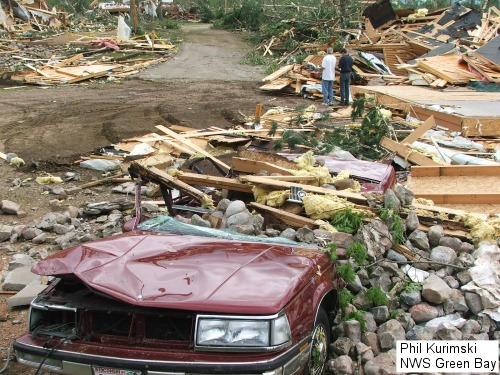
Tornado damage from the EF3 tornado at the Bear Paw Resort in northern Wisconsin.

A low pressure system moved across much of central and eastern North America starting on June 6 in the central Plains and into the Mississippi Valley, Great Lakes region and eventually the Northeast over the following few days. On June 4, the Storm Prediction Center issued a moderate risk of severe weather for June 6, only the fourth such issuance for a day three outlook. On the morning of June 5, the Storm Prediction Center continued the moderate risk for June 6 and issued a moderate risk for June 7 over much of the Upper Midwest, making it the fifth time a moderate risk has been issued on day 3. Both were forwarded to days 1 and 2, respectively, on June 6.

On June 6, there were two distinct threats forecast. The central Plains were expected to see a large tornado outbreak potentially, particularly in Nebraska and the Dakotas close to the dry line, should the cap have broken in the atmosphere in the afternoon hours. In the evening and overnight hours, a major derecho with destructive winds and some scattered tornadoes were possible farther east, particularly in the eastern Dakotas, western Minnesota and western Iowa. However, that basically busted as little severe weather happened as the cap held up in most areas. Only five tornadoes and scattered wind reports took place.

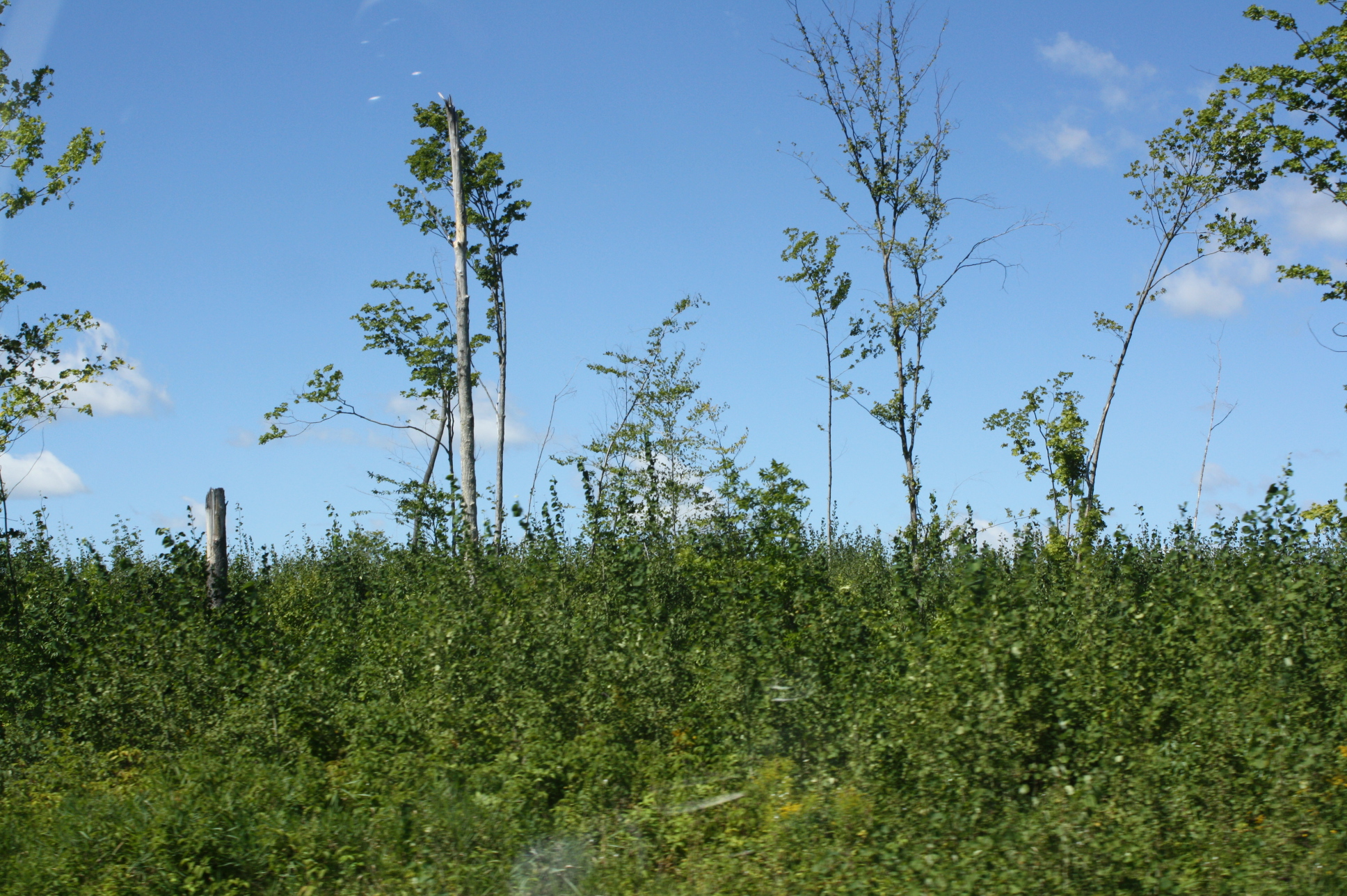
Tornado damage from the EF3 Wisconsin tornado in 2010 at WIS 32.

A high risk of severe storms was issued for June 7 for the Upper Midwest, from about the Quad Cities north to Lake Superior. Widespread tornadoes and destructive downburst winds were possible. A moderate risk was issued for portions of Minnesota, Michigan and Illinois while a slight risk was issued south towards Oklahoma, which was then upgraded to a moderate risk late in the day. Environment Canada also issued a risk of severe thunderstorms with possible tornadoes for all of northwestern Ontario and a severe weather watch was issued early Thursday morning from the Manitoba border towards the north shore of Lake Superior

There were 14 tornado reports that day. The most serious damage was near Mosinee, Wisconsin, where a house was heavily damaged by an EF2 tornado, and in Wisconsin Rapids, Wisconsin where a weak tornado touched down in or near the downtown area, along with softball sized hail. However, farther south, the cap has held in place once again, restricting activity to the northern areas.

The worst event on June 7 was an EF3 tornado that touched down in central Wisconsin. It was on the ground for 40 miles (64 km) while passing through Shawano, Menominee, Langlade, and Oconto counties. It was up to 3/4 mile (1.2 km) wide at times and took down 14,000 acres (57 km^{2}) of forest, damaging dozens of buildings.

On June 8, Environment Canada issued a moderate risk of severe thunderstorms for Eastern Ontario with the risk of tornadoes. A slight risk was issued for most of Southern and Northeastern Ontario. The slight risk zone extends from southern Quebec, near Montreal into northern Mexico During the noon hours, the moderate risk zone was extended further south to includes portions of western New York, western Pennsylvania, northern West Virginia, northern Kentucky, southeastern Indiana, most of Ohio and larger portions of southern Ontario from Windsor to eastern Ontario. It turned out to be a long squall line though, and while there was wind damage from winds as strong as 85 miles per hour (137 km/h) stretching from the Tennessee Valley north to almost Hudson Bay, there were only two tornadoes, one near Brantford southwest of Toronto and the other near Bancroft north of Peterborough, Ontario.

=== June 7 (Vietnam) ===
A strong, long-track tornado damaged dozens of buildings in multiple villages in Hưng Hà district, Thái Bình province, northern Vietnam, killing one person.

=== June 13 (Vietnam) ===
A destructive tornado struck the Triệu Sơn district in Thanh Hóa province of central Vietnam, killing two people and heavily damaging nearly 500 houses.

=== June 21–24 ===
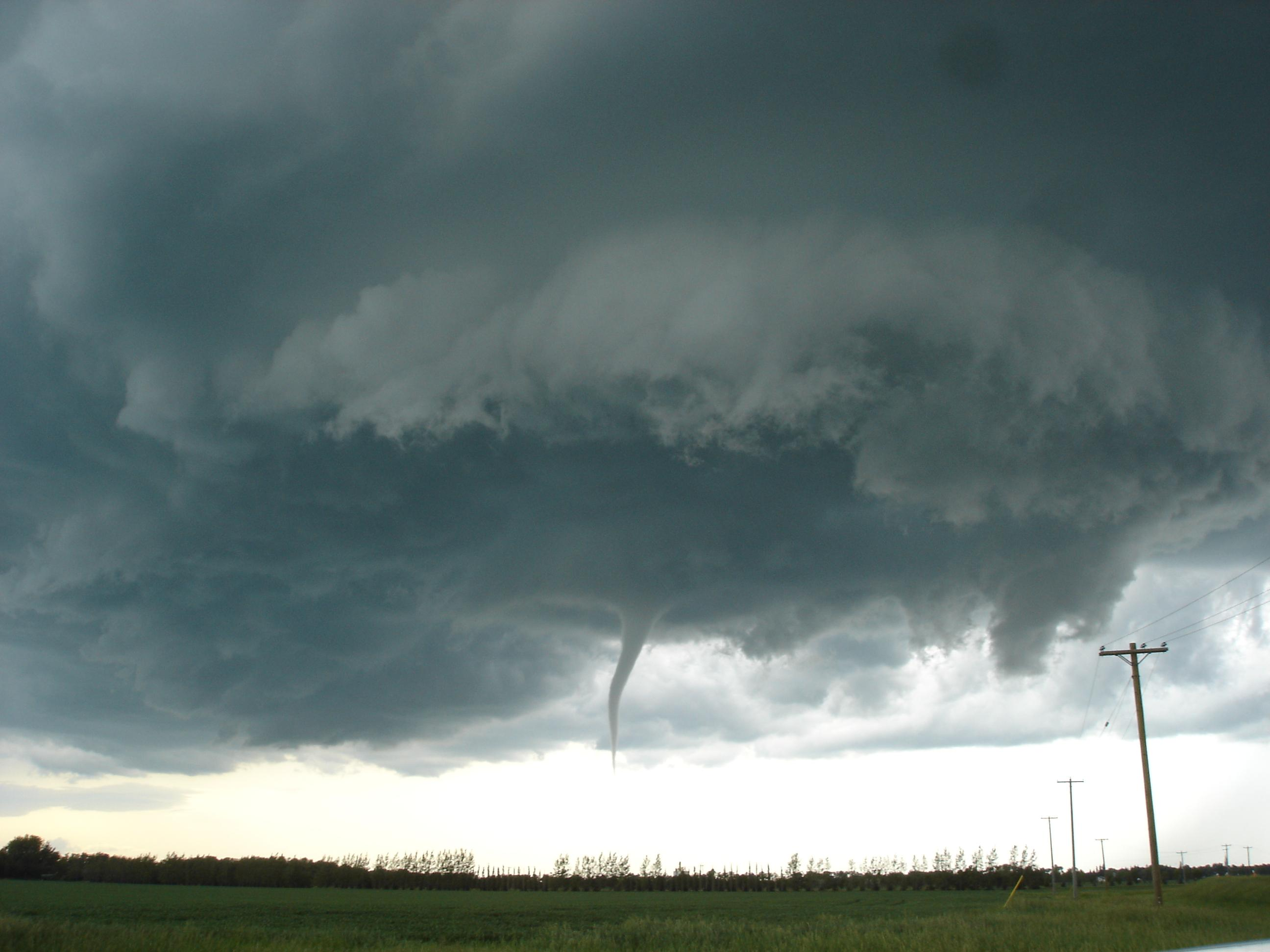
Funnel cloud that later produced the F5 tornado near Elie, Manitoba on June 22, 2007.

EFU	EF0	EF1	EF2	EF3	EF4	EF5
0	9	6	1	0	0	0

FU	F0	F1	F2	F3	F4	F5
0	1	2	2	1	0	1

A moderate risk of severe thunderstorms was issued by the Storm Prediction Center for portions of eastern Iowa during the late afternoon of June 21. Seven tornadoes were reported across the Plains as a large cluster of storms moved eastward. Several reports of large hail exceeding golf ball size was reported. The strongest tornado took place in Norwalk, Iowa, where an EF2 tornado heavily damaged homes.

On June 22, more severe storms developed, this time primarily farther north. The most intense weather was across southern Manitoba where tornadoes were reported. The most severe damage was around Elie, Manitoba where several houses were flattened or swept away and numerous others damaged or destroyed. A flour mill was also destroyed and several trucks were overturned on Highway 1. The tornado path was 3.7 miles (6.0 km) long, and was initially rated as an F4 on the Fujita Scale before detailed video debris analysis warranted an upgrade to F5 making it the first such tornado in Canada. Another tornado hit McHenry County, North Dakota; it was an EF1 with moderate damage, mainly to trees and farm buildings.

More tornadoes occurred on June 23. A volatile setup for severe thunderstorms was realized in far southeast Saskatchewan by late afternoon and resulted in two long lived supercells that moved southeast into southwest Manitoba and eventually far northeast North Dakota by nightfall. At east five tornadoes were reported, including a significant wedge tornado near Pipestone, Manitoba that was rated F3 on the Fujita scale after inflicting substantial damage to some rural homes.

=== June 26 (Ontario) ===
A single tornado hit Ignace, Ontario in the north-west part of the province overturning boats, causing damage to trees and property as well as injuring one person.

== July ==
55 tornadoes were reported in the U.S. in July, however 69 were confirmed.

=== July 3 (China) ===
A deadly and destructive tornado in Eastern China killed 14 people and injured 196 others. Three villages in the province of Anhui were particularly hard hit by the storm. It was estimated to have touched down around 2:50 pm local time and lifted around 6:00 pm local time, making it one of the longest-lived tornadoes ever recorded at roughly 3 hours and 10 minutes in duration. Along the tornado's path, 12,391 homes were destroyed and 3,180 were damaged. At least 30,000 people were affected by the tornado and damages were estimated at ¥55 million (US$7.2 million). Local news reports referred to the tornado as the worst in nearly 50 years in China. The Chinese Government reported that the tornado packed winds of at least 100 km/h (60 mph), equivalent to an F1 tornado.

=== July 4–5 (New Zealand) ===
An outbreak of tornadoes occurred across New Zealand's North Island. Six were reported in the city of New Plymouth, Taranaki, devastating many houses and part of the Central Business District. Whakatane, Tauranga, and Auckland were also affected by tornadoes.

=== July 8 (Ontario) ===
An F1 tornado near Mildmay, Ontario destroyed a large implementation shed, reportedly hurling debris 1.5 km away and moving 50 kg drums. Another tornado was reported in the area, but it was not confirmed.

=== July 15 ===
EFU	EF0	EF1	EF2	EF3	EF4	EF5
0	4	4	3	0	0	0

On the evening of July 15, several supercells formed across the Dakotas. Eight tornadoes were confirmed; five in North Dakota and one in South Dakota. Among them were three EF2 tornadoes, which did significant damage to a number of farm properties across the region. Widespread straight-line wind damage was also reported in the area. However, no one was injured. Other tornadoes were also confirmed earlier in the day in Texas, North Carolina, and Maine.

=== July 19 (Ireland) ===
An EF1 tornado touched down in the Belfast Lough area of Northern Ireland. This was the third tornado in the area in the last six months.

=== July 20–22 (Poland) ===
An F3 tornado touched down near Częstochowa, Poland, causing damage to over 250 buildings, many with roofs blown out, some with brick walls partially collapsed. Most damaged villages was Huby, Silesian Voivodeship, Adamów, Gmina Kłomnice and Skrzydlów Two days later small tornado outbreak occurred in east Poland and west Ukraine. A long track F2 tornado touch down near Krzczeń in Lublin Voivodeship, and destroys one house. The tornado moved east as far as Tomashovka in Belarus on a track over 100 km long. It caused damage to recreation centers in Okuninka on the Jezioro Białe lake. 4 people were injured. Another F2 Tornado occurred in Gotówka Niemiecka.

=== July 30 (Philippines) ===
Around 4 pm local time on July 30, a strong tornado struck three barangays, injuring two people, destroyed two homes and damaged 12 others. The mayor of the affected region provided financial assistance to the displaced families following the tornado.

== August ==
87 tornadoes were reported in the US in August, of which 73 were confirmed.

=== August 8 (New York) ===
EFU	EF0	EF1	EF2	EF3	EF4	EF5
0	0	1	1	0	0	0

An EF2 tornado struck New York City at 6:30 am EDT (10:30 UTC) on August 8. The hardest-hit area was the Bay Ridge area of Brooklyn, where many trees—as much as 40% of the trees in Sunset Park were knocked down and several homes and buildings lost part of their roofs. A second tornado was also confirmed just east of the track of the first tornado and rated as a strong EF1 where additional roofs of homes were damaged. The Flatbush neighborhood, as well as areas on Staten Island, were also affected.

Accompanying the tornadoes was a storm which dumped several inches of rain on the city in a few hours, resulting in flooding which effectively shut down the mass transit system. Several people were injured by the tornado, and one person died from the associated flooding. The tornado was the first to hit Brooklyn since 1950 when modern record-keeping began.

=== August 10 (Philippines) ===
A destructive tornado struck Zambales, Philippines, heavily damaging or destroying several homes and killing one person.

=== August 19 (Typhoon Sepat) ===
A tornado spawned by Typhoon Sepat touched down in Zhejiang Province, killing 13 people and injuring at least 62 others. More than 1,100 buildings were destroyed and 22,700 hectares of crops were damaged by the tornado. The tornado touched down around 11:30 pm local time near Wenzhou City. The half-mile (800 m) wide tornado tracked for 5 mi (8 km) before dissipating. Eight of the 62 people who were injured sustained serious injuries. Damages from the tornado were estimated at 138.35 million yuan (US$18. million).

=== August 22 (Philippines) ===
During the evening of August 22, a strong tornado struck the town of Bulacan. The tornado destroyed 44 homes and damaged 21 others while injuring two people. Four days after the tornado, the local governments provided roofing materials to the affected homes.

=== August 23–24 ===
EFU	EF0	EF1	EF2	EF3	EF4	EF5
0	7	3	1	1	0	0

A large derecho with winds up to 100 mph (160 km/h) did significant damage in the Chicago area and in western Michigan. Embedded in the derecho was an EF1 tornado that touched down in Winfield, Illinois in DuPage County. An EF0 tornado was spotted in Sanilac County, Michigan around 5:21 pm EDT on August 23 after the hot muggy day caused convection east of an oncoming (eastbound) cold front. Another unconfirmed tornado was spotted tracking from Livonia, Michigan to Redford Township, Michigan. The National Weather Service office in Grand Rapids, Michigan also confirmed that an EF1 tornadoes hit rural Montcalm County near Cedar Lake. Non-tornadic severe thunderstorms also did serious damage in Berrien, Van Buren, Kalamazoo, and Allegan counties.

On August 24, following conditions similar to the previous day, an EF3 tornado with winds near 140 mph (230 km/h) formed two miles (3 km) north of Charlotte, Michigan, doing severe damage along Vermontville Highway, passing through Potterville, near 21st Century Plastics Corporation, and crossing I-69 in Eaton County before dissipating as it approached Dimondale, touching down around 4:25 pm EDT and leaving a damage path varying from 200 yards (200 m) to 300 yards (300 m) wide and 6.5 miles (10.5 km) long. Around 4:55 pm EDT, the same storm produced an EF1 tornado which touched down at the intersection of Waverly Road and M-99 in southeastern Lansing, extending across I-96, towards the intersections of Aurelius Road with Jolly Road and Dunkel Road before finally dissipating near the Jolly Road interchange on I-496.

Other storms in the same system later produced tornadoes in the NWS Detroit/Pontiac office coverage area. The most powerful one was a strong EF2 tornado that touched down in Cohoctah Township, Livingston County, Michigan at around 5:30 pm EDT. Remaining on the ground for 26 miles (42 km), with an average track width of 200 yards (200 m) and a maximum track width of 0.25 mi (0.40 km) in the city of Fenton, Genesee County, the funnel continued through Deerfield Township and northwestern Tyrone Township before entering Genesee County and the city of Fenton, where it caused the partial collapse of "a large retail structure" at the intersection of Owen Road and US-23. It then passed on into Holly, in Oakland County before dissipating into straight-line winds east of Holly.

Three other tornadoes were confirmed by damage surveys. An EF0 tornado touched down briefly (track length of 0.25 miles (0.40 km)) near the intersection of Durand Road and M-21 in eastern Shiawassee County, Michigan at around 5:23 pm EDT, while another EF0 tornado touched down for 3 miles (4.8 km) in Salem Township, Washtenaw County at around 6:02 pm EDT. Additionally, an EF1 tornado struck in Hadley Township, Lapeer County, at around 6:16 pm EDT, leaving a 4-mile-long (6.4 km) damage path. Numerous reports of straight-line wind damage were also received throughout the entire NWS Detroit/Pontiac coverage area. The storms in this system were part of the same system that sat over the Midwest for almost a week, bringing pouring rain at first and then the severe weather later in the week. This storm system and stationary front also caused severe flooding in Ohio.

=== August 23 (Colombia) ===
A rare tornado occurred in the capital of Colombia, Bogotá, and was caught on tape. There were no immediate word on any damage or injuries. Much of western Colombia lies along the Andes mountain chain which limits tornado activity in that region. However, in June 2001 a tornado killed six people and injured 350 in the town of Barranquillia in extreme northern Colombia.

=== August 26 ===
EFU	EF0	EF1	EF2	EF3	EF4	EF5
0	5	3	1	1	1	0

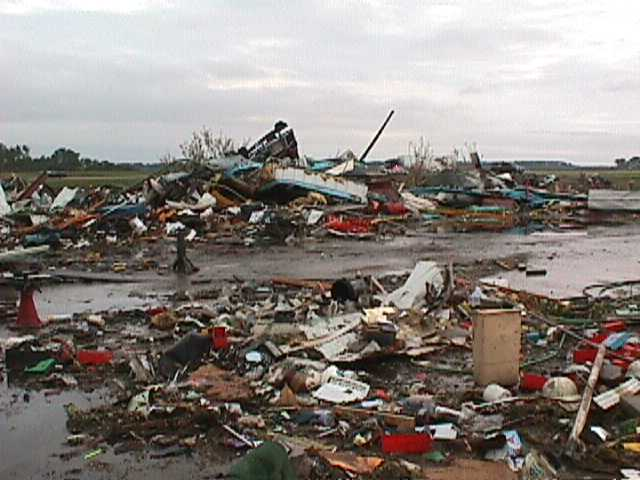
EF4 damage to a construction company in Northwood, North Dakota.

A localized but damaging tornado outbreak produced 11 tornadoes in eastern North Dakota and northwestern Minnesota on the evening of August 26. The strongest event of the outbreak was a large, rain-wrapped EF4 wedge tornado that devastated the town of Northwood, North Dakota. This multiple-vortex tornado began to the southwest of town, snapping numerous trees and striking the Northwood Muni-Vince Airport at EF1 strength, where several planes were damaged. A metal storage building and a small airplane hangar were reduced to bare slabs at that location. The tornado grew to nearly 1-mile-wide (1.6 km) and reached EF3 strength as it struck Northwood directly. Of the roughly 460 homes in Northwood, 90% of them sustained some type of damage. The local health center, bank, fire station, school, supermarket, and grain elevator were all damaged. Near the grain elevator, several rail cars were knocked off the tracks. Hundreds of trees were snapped, uprooted, or damaged throughout town, and one person was killed in a mobile home park that was destroyed at the north edge of town. A small area of EF4 damage was noted as the tornado exited at the northeast corner of town. An agricultural company, a construction company, and a car dealership were completely destroyed in this area. The construction company was entirely flattened, with steel beams twisted and thrown into nearby fields. A large metal storage tank that originated in this area was found 1.5 miles (2.4 km) away in a corn field. Numerous vehicles were thrown hundreds of yards from the car dealership, many of which were mangled beyond recognition. Farm fields in this area were heavily scoured, and mature corn stalks in one field were snapped at the base and flattened to the ground, with husked ears of corn found scattered about. EF1 damage was observed further to the northeast before the tornado dissipated. In addition to the fatality, 18 others were injured in Northwood. An EF2 tornado touched down near Reynolds, North Dakota, snapping numerous trees near the Red River, and flattening a flag pole and an antique windmill to the ground. The tornado crossed into Minnesota, where a quonset hut and a pole shed were destroyed before the tornado dissipated near Eldred. Later that evening, a large EF3 tornado passed near Rugh Lake, North Dakota, destroying garages and outbuildings on three farms, tossing grain bins, and snapping numerous trees. Gravel roads were deeply scarred by flying debris, five bison were killed, and two heavy combines were thrown and smashed to pieces by the tornado. Eight other weak tornadoes occurred that evening as well.

== September ==
63 tornadoes were reported in the US in September, of which 52 were confirmed.

=== September 30 ===
EFU	EF0	EF1	EF2	EF3	EF4	EF5
0	4	1	1	0	0	0

Severe thunderstorms developed across the Midwest on September 30. Several tornadoes touched down, the strongest being a large EF2 tornado near Sully, Iowa, which traveled 22 miles (35 km) and up to 0.7 miles (1.1 km) wide at its peak. Heavy damage was reported to several houses and industrial buildings along the tornado's path. Two children also suffered minor injuries in Perry, Illinois after an EF0 tornado blew a tree down on their mobile home, causing extensive damage.

== October ==
115 tornadoes were reported in the US in October, of which 87 have been confirmed.

=== October 2 ===
EFU	EF0	EF1	EF2	EF3	EF4	EF5
0	9	5	1	0	0	0

A sharp cold front with low-topped supercells triggered a moderate outbreak of tornadoes across a portion of the Central United States, particularly in the central Mississippi Valley. At least 15 tornadoes were reported, resulting in at least two injuries and scattered reports of damage, including structural damage to buildings. One of first tornadoes of the outbreak was a brief EF1 tornado that moved directly through Downtown Des Moines, Iowa, snapping power lines and power poles and flipping vehicles along Mulberry Street. Shortly after that a skipping EF2 tornado, the strongest tornado of the outbreak, began near Woodland, Missouri and moved east-northeastward to near North Fork. It first damaged trees and heavily damaged a home before later destroying a mobile home. (critically injuring one elderly occupant). Later, an EF1 tornado, touched down near Woodland and moved northeastward through the southern part of Palmyra. Several structures suffered minor to heavy damage, trees were damaged, and a semi trailer was tossed into two other trailers. A car on U.S. 61 was also flipped twice, injuring the driver. Around the same time, an EF0 tornado touched down and moved through Palmyra itself, causing minor damage to trees, power lines, and several structures. Other weak tornadoes were also confirmed for the rest across the region for the rest of the day, including a brief anti-cyclonic EF0 tornado southeast of Bussey, Iowa.

=== October 4 (Spain) ===
A large, destructive supercell storm impacted the Balearic Islands, most specifically the island of Mallorca where a tornado was documented in the capital city, Palma de Mallorca. This storm caused considerable damage in many areas of the city and the island.

=== October 10 (Bangladesh) ===
A tornado damaged 10 houses in Barek Tila, a village in the Sunamganj District of northern Bangladesh, injuring 25 people. Another tornado also struck north-central Jamalpur District, damaging 500 homes and 200 hectares (2.0 km^{2}) of sugarcane.

=== October 15 (Bangladesh) ===
Three tornadoes hit the Barisal District, Gopalganj and Bhola District districts of southern Bangladesh, killing seven people and leaving 3,000 people homeless.

=== October 17–19 ===
EFU	EF0	EF1	EF2	EF3	EF4	EF5
0	19	26	15	3	0	0

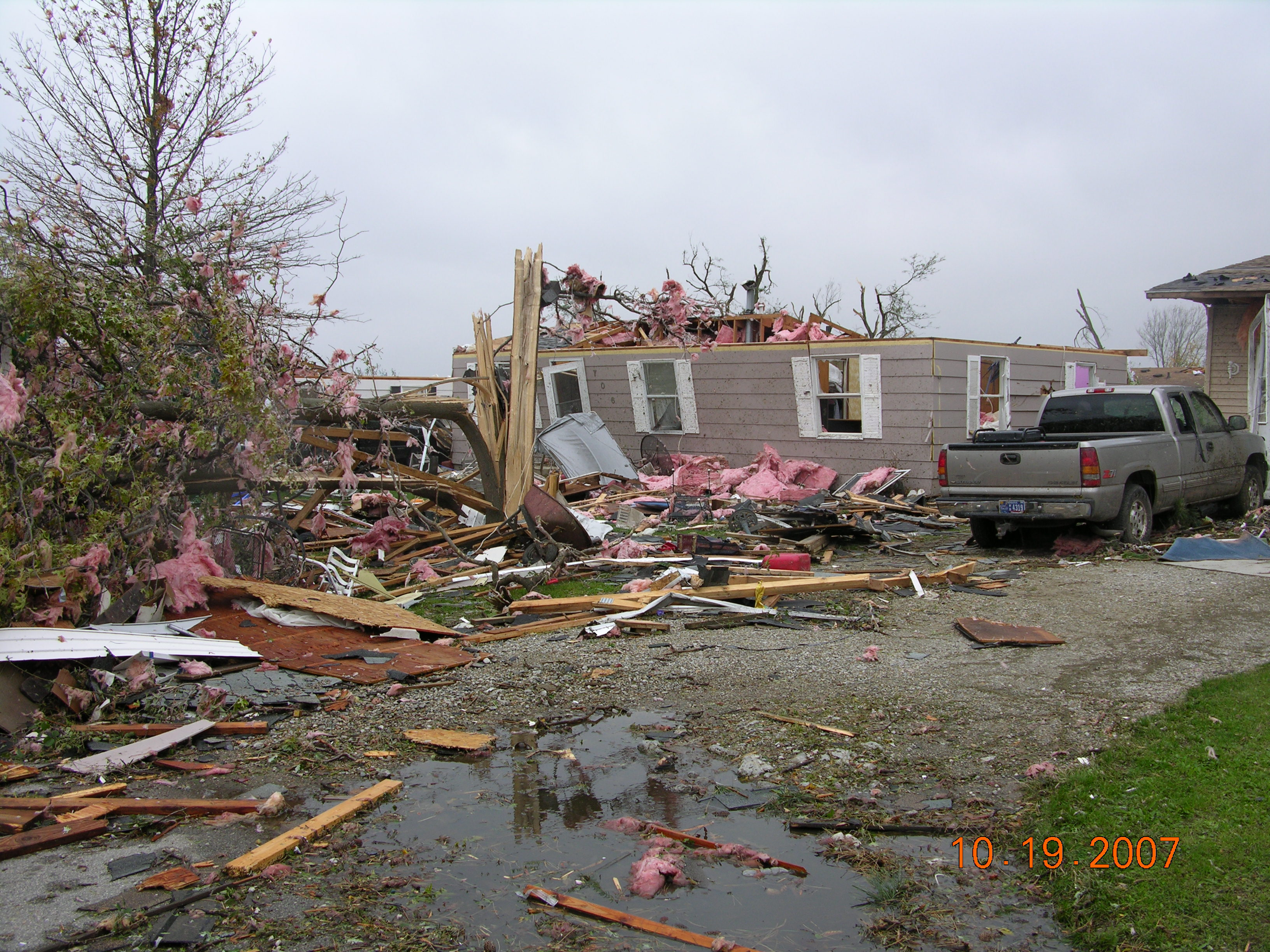
Tornado damage in Nappanee, Indiana on October 18, 2007.

A complex storm system, involving a deepening low pressure area, a tropical low and a series of fronts, developed across the central United States. The SPC forecast a potential severe weather event, possibly a major outbreak, beginning October 17 across much of central and eastern North America. A moderate risk of severe storms was issued for October 17 across parts of the central U.S. Some activity developed early in the morning of October 17, although no tornadoes were reported. The main supercell activity began that afternoon across a wide swath from Missouri south to Louisiana and west to Oklahoma. At least 16 tornadoes were reported and seven confirmed, with damage in Franklinton, Louisiana from an EF1 tornado as well as damage in Mount Vernon, Missouri from an EF2 tornado. In addition, KTUL has reported at least 40 people were injured in Tulsa at Oktoberfest when thunderstorm winds ripped through the area. The activity turned deadly overnight as an isolated tornado developed in the overnight hours near Paris, Missouri. Two people were killed when a high-end EF2 tornado hit a mobile home southeast of Granville.

More severe weather was expected on October 18 across the Ohio Valley and the Great Lakes region. Another moderate risk was issued with tornadoes being the main threat. Tornadoes were also possible across the Southern US, particularly the Gulf Coast. The activity began quickly in the southern threat area, and an EF1 tornado took place in the downtown area of Pensacola, Florida. Damage was reported to many buildings in the downtown core, as well as a section of Cordova Mall. Electricity was cut in the area. No injuries were reported. In total, 46 tornadoes were confirmed. The hardest-hit state was Kentucky, where many tornadic supercells formed between Paducah and Louisville, and WFIE has reported many injuries and possible fatalities in numerous communities. At least one person was confirmed dead in Owensboro, Kentucky. However, the National Weather Service has only confirmed minor injuries. A high-end EF3 tornado struck Nappanee, Indiana; a tornado emergency was declared there. One person was confirmed dead in Kalkaska, Michigan following an EF2 tornado there while two other people were killed in Ingham County in the Lansing area by another EF2 tornado that caused extensive damage in the Williamston area. While early indications had severe weather continuing into October 19, the lack of sunshine prevented initiation even though temperatures in the 80s Fahrenheit were common as far north as southeastern Ontario and southwestern Quebec.

=== October 26 (Australia) ===
A spectacular multiple-vortex tornado developed near the town of Dunoon, near the City of Lismore, New South Wales, Australia. The tornado developed from a supercell at approximately 4pm damaging a power sub-station then going on to Dunoon where it ripped the wall of a church and damaged the roofs and walls of about 20 houses. The tornado was captured on film by both a local and Australian stormchaser Jimmy Deguara and estimated to be at least an EF1 in strength.

== November ==
Seven tornadoes were reported in the U.S. in November, all of which were confirmed.

=== November 6 (Colombia) ===
While tornado occurrences are very rare, the Colombian capital Bogotá was hit by its second tornado of the year. The tornado which was also caught on tape, tore up the roof of a car dealership and additional scattered damage. No injuries or deaths were reported during the tornado event. The area was hit with extensive severe weather over the past few days which included torrential rains that caused significant flooding across the region as well as hail and wind. Hundreds of motorists were stranding on area roads due to the extensive amounts of hail and rain.

=== November 14 ===
EFU	EF0	EF1	EF2	EF3	EF4	EF5
0	1	3	1	0	0	0

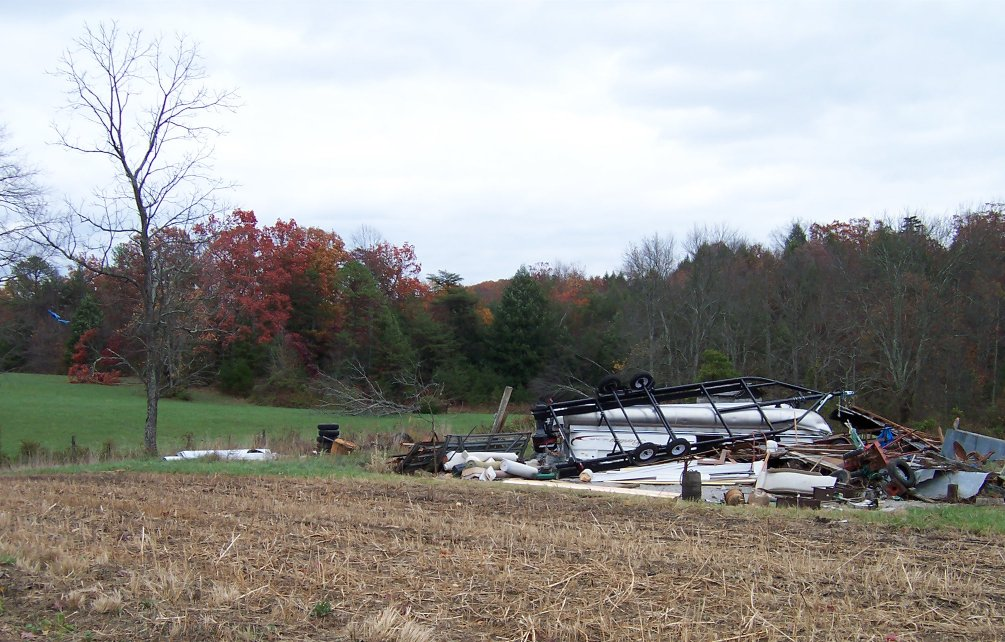
Tornado damage in Laurel County, Kentucky on November 14, 2007.

After a lull in activity in the US, several tornadoes touched down across parts of the Tennessee Valley north into Kentucky on November 14. The strongest was an EF2 tornado in Kimball, Tennessee where several houses and a church were heavily damaged, injuring nine people. Structural damage was also reported in Laurel County, Kentucky and in two counties in Middle Tennessee from separate EF1 tornadoes.

== December ==
22 tornadoes were reported in the US in December, of which 19 were confirmed.

=== December 15–16 (Southeast) ===
EFU	EF0	EF1	EF2	EF3	EF4	EF5
0	3	4	1	0	0	0

A complex weather system developed in mid-December, involving the merging of the remnants of Tropical Storm Olga with a cold front associated with a major winter storm to the north over the Northeast and Midwest. As a result, the first severe weather episode in more than a month in the US produced several tornadoes across the Deep South, particularly southern Georgia and northern and central Florida, late on December 15 and early on December 16. At least 12 tornadoes were reported across the region, with significant damage in several communities. In addition, straight line wind damage has also been reported across the region. One of the more notable tornadoes, an EF1 tornado, hit the Pasco County Jail, causing significant damage to the facility. No one was injured there. The strongest was an EF2 tornado near Lothair, Georgia. One person was killed near Ashburn, Georgia, when his eighteen-wheeler was thrown off I-75 by an EF1 tornado.

=== December 20 ===
EFU	EF0	EF1	EF2	EF3	EF4	EF5
0	1	2	2	0	0	0

Severe thunderstorms developed in the Southeast late in the evening on December 19, with wind and hail damage reported in eastern Texas, Louisiana, Mississippi, and Alabama. Early on December 20, a large MCV (meso-scale convective vortex) developed across Central Louisiana and moved eastward, spawning a severe squall line that produced wind damage as well as five tornadoes across southern Mississippi. One strong EF2 tornado formed near Brookhaven, damaging several buildings and destroying two mobile homes, injuring one person. Another EF2 tornado also touched down west of Laurel; three mobile homes and an outbuilding were destroyed, several homes suffered minor to heavy damage, cars were heavily damaged, and numerous trees, some large, were snapped or uprooted. Two people were injured.

== See also ==
- Weather of 2007
- Tornado
  - Tornadoes by year
  - Tornado records
  - Tornado climatology
  - Tornado myths
- List of tornado outbreaks
  - List of F5 and EF5 tornadoes
  - List of F4 and EF4 tornadoes
  - List of North American tornadoes and tornado outbreaks
  - List of 21st-century Canadian tornadoes and tornado outbreaks
  - List of European tornadoes and tornado outbreaks
  - List of tornadoes and tornado outbreaks in Asia
  - List of Southern Hemisphere tornadoes and tornado outbreaks
  - List of tornadoes striking downtown areas
  - List of tornadoes with confirmed satellite tornadoes
- Tornado intensity
  - Fujita scale
  - Enhanced Fujita scale
  - International Fujita scale
  - TORRO scale
