= Lidia Burzyńska =

Polish politician and deputy

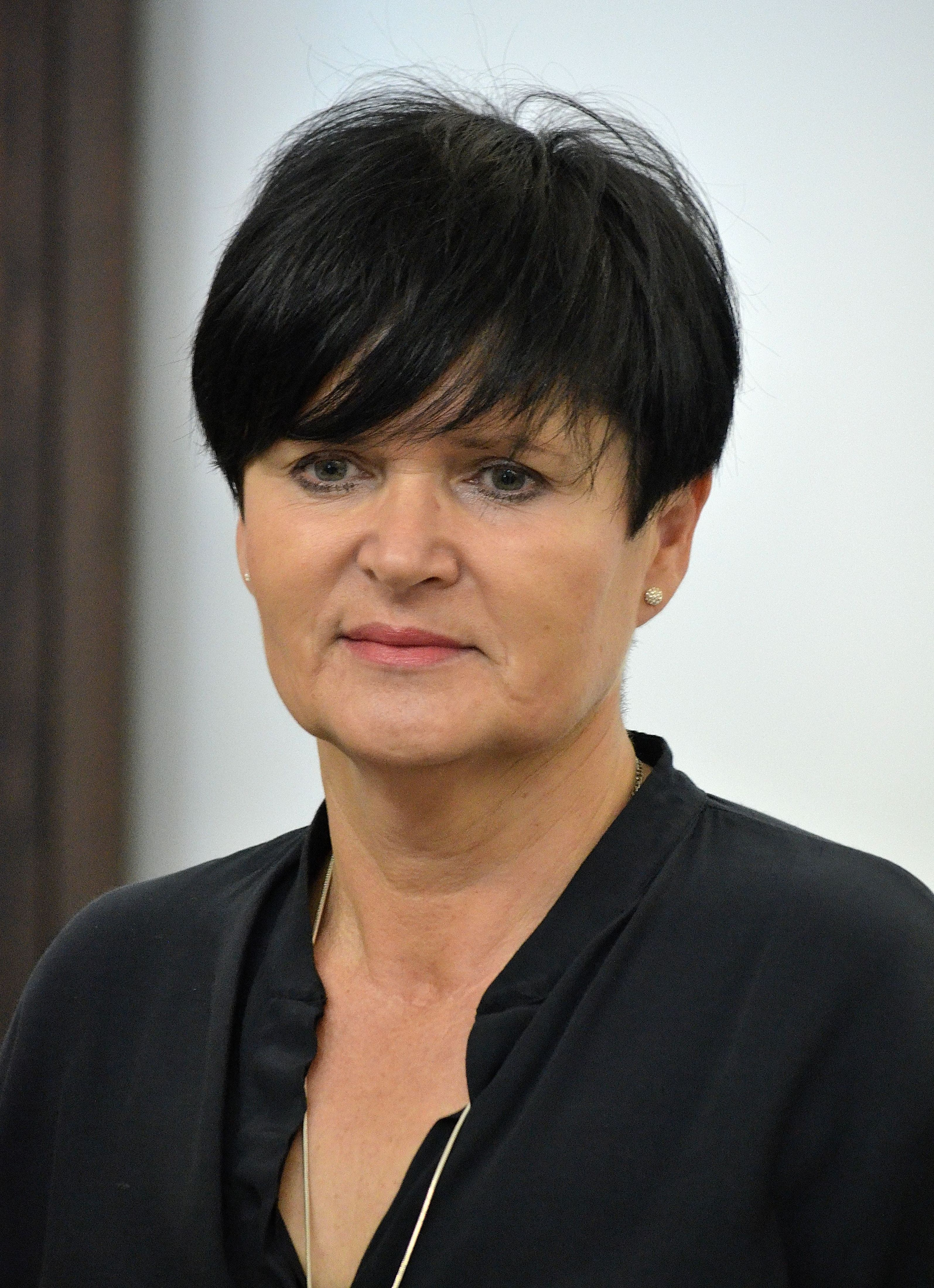

member of Sejm 2019-2023
- Incumbent
- Assumed office 2015

Personal details
- Born: 27 August 1964 (age 62) Rzeki Wielkie
- Party: Law and Justice
- Education: Silesian University
- Occupation: Teacher, Politician

Lidia Ewa Burzyńska (born 27 August 1964 in Rzeki Wielkie) – is a Polish politician, teacher and local official.

== Biography ==
She graduated from the Silesian University (1990, History Department).

From 1994 to 1998 she was a councilor of the gmina Kłomnice. From 2006 to 2014 she was a councilor of the Częstochowa County, in 2014 she did not receive re-election.

In 2011 Burzyńska applied unsuccessfully for a parliamentary mandate. In the elections in 2015, she was again a candidate to the Sejm from the Częstochowa district. She was elected, receiving 9,760 votes. Lidia Burzyńska has obtained a parliamentary mandate again in the elections in 2019.
