= Vershinino =

Vershinino (Russian: Вершинино) is the name of several rural localities in Russia:

- Vershinino, Borovlyansky Selsoviet, Troitsky District, Altai Krai, a station in Borovlyansky Selsoviet of Troitsky District of Altai Krai
- Vershinino, Zelenopolyansky Selsoviet, Troitsky District, Altai Krai, a selo in Zelenopolyansky Selsoviet of Troitsky District of Altai Krai
- Vershinino, Konoshsky District, Arkhangelsk Oblast, a village in Klimovsky Selsoviet of Konoshsky District of Arkhangelsk Oblast
- Vershinino, Plesetsky District, Arkhangelsk Oblast, a village in Kenozersky Selsoviet of Plesetsky District of Arkhangelsk Oblast
- Vershinino, Ivanovo Oblast, a village in Zavolzhsky District of Ivanovo Oblast
- Vershinino, Chernyakhovsky District, Kaliningrad Oblast, a settlement in Svobodnensky Rural Okrug of Chernyakhovsky District of Kaliningrad Oblast
- Vershinino, Zelenogradsky District, Kaliningrad Oblast, a settlement in Kovrovsky Rural Okrug of Zelenogradsky District of Kaliningrad Oblast
- Vershinino, Bolshemurashkinsky District, Nizhny Novgorod Oblast, a selo in Sovetsky Selsoviet of Bolshemurashkinsky District of Nizhny Novgorod Oblast
- Vershinino, Kstovsky District, Nizhny Novgorod Oblast, a village in Chernukhinsky Selsoviet of Kstovsky District of Nizhny Novgorod Oblast
- Vershinino, Sergachsky District, Nizhny Novgorod Oblast, a selo in Andreyevsky Selsoviet of Sergachsky District of Nizhny Novgorod Oblast
- Vershinino, Perm Krai, a village in Kochyovsky District of Perm Krai
- Vershinino, Tomsk Oblast, a selo in Tomsky District of Tomsk Oblast
