= Lipicze, Silesian Voivodeship =

Lipicze
- Village
- Location within Poland
- Coordinates: 50°56′N 19°23′E
- Country: Poland
- Voivodeship: Silesian
- County: Częstochowa
- Gmina: Kłomnice
- Population: 345

Lipicze [liˈpit͡ʂɛ] is a village in the administrative district of Gmina Kłomnice, within Częstochowa County, Silesian Voivodeship, in southern Poland.
