= Kłomnice =

- Village
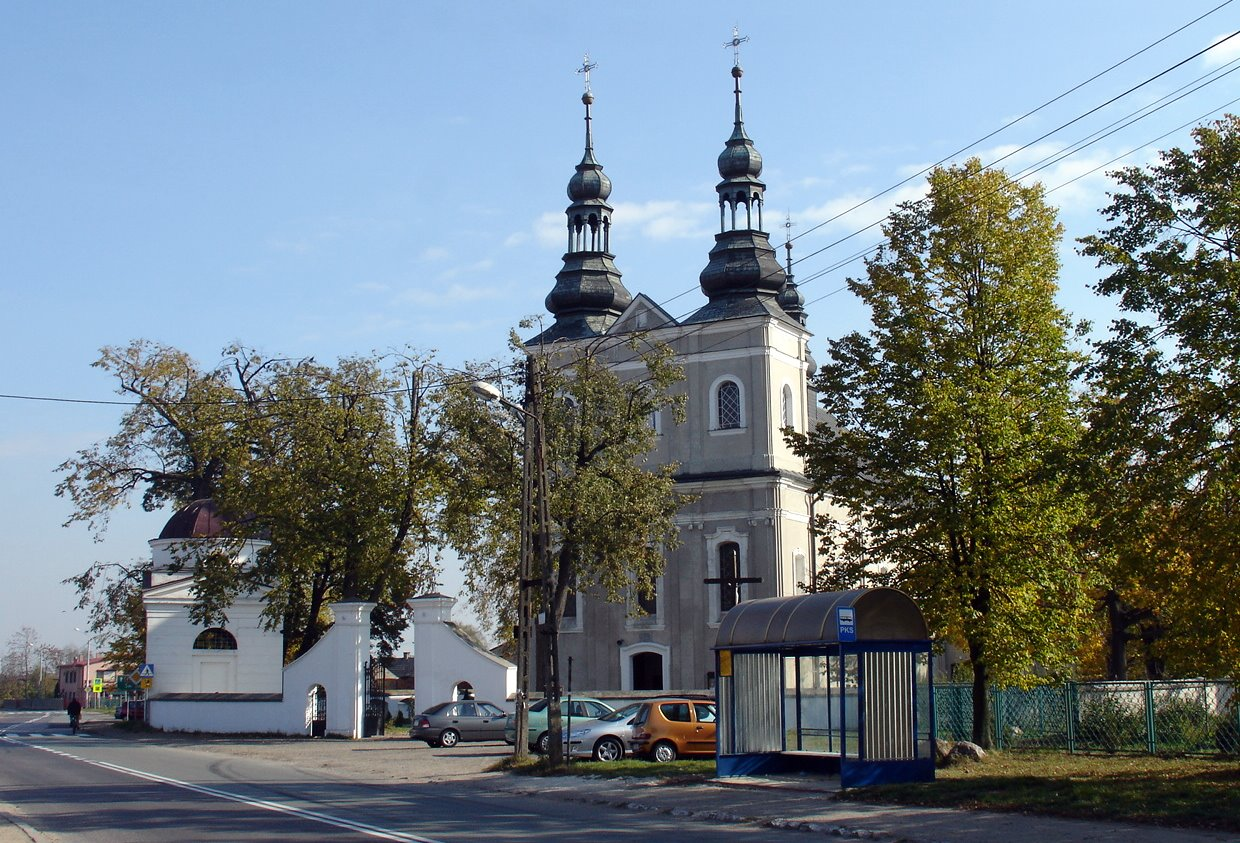
- Church of Saint Martin

- Location within Poland
- Coordinates: 50°55′N 19°21′E
- Country: Poland
- Voivodeship: Silesian
- County: Częstochowa
- Gmina: Kłomnice

Population
  - Total: 2,802
- Time zone: UTC+1 (CET)
  - Summer (DST): UTC+2 (CEST)
- Vehicle registration: SCZ

Kłomnice [kwɔmˈnit͡sɛ] is a village in Częstochowa County, Silesian Voivodeship, in southern Poland. It is the seat of the gmina (administrative district) called Gmina Kłomnice.

During World War II the village was occupied by Germany. In September 1944, during the Warsaw Uprising, the Germans deported 2,000 Varsovians from the Dulag 121 camp in Pruszków, where they were initially imprisoned, to Kłomnice. Those Poles were mainly old people, ill people and women with children.

== Gallery ==
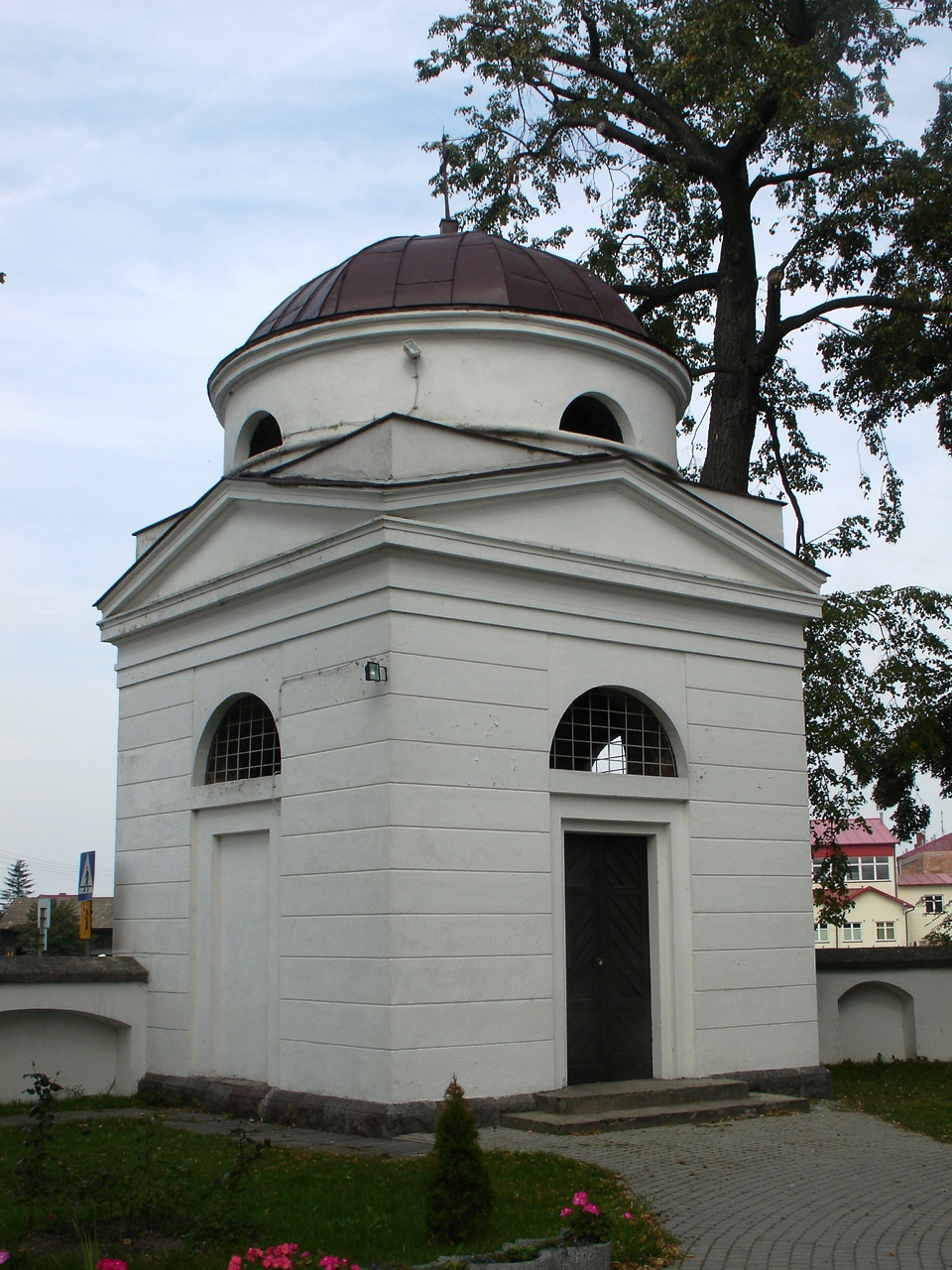
18th-century belfry

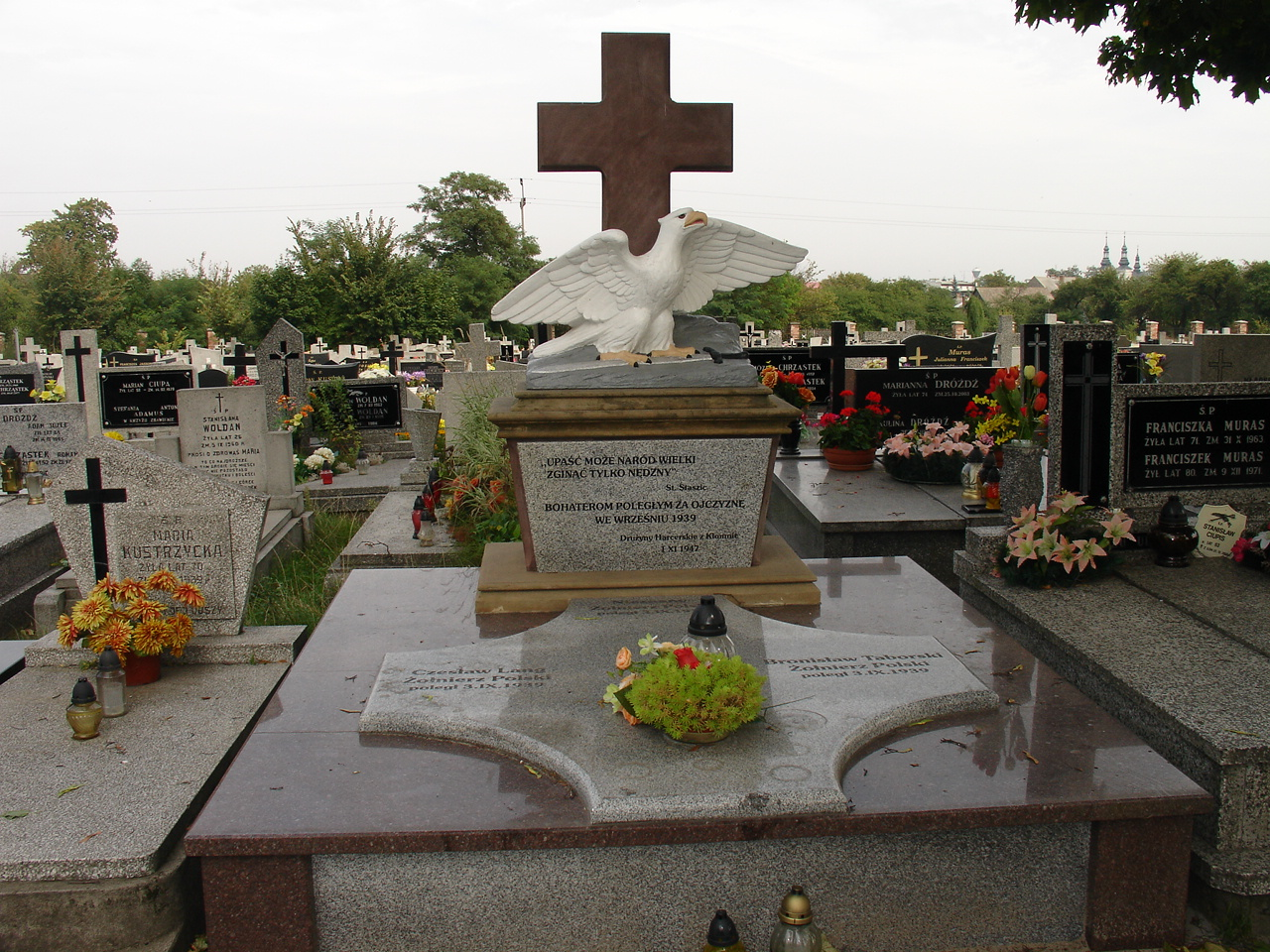
Grave of Polish soldiers killed during the German invasion of Poland (World War II)

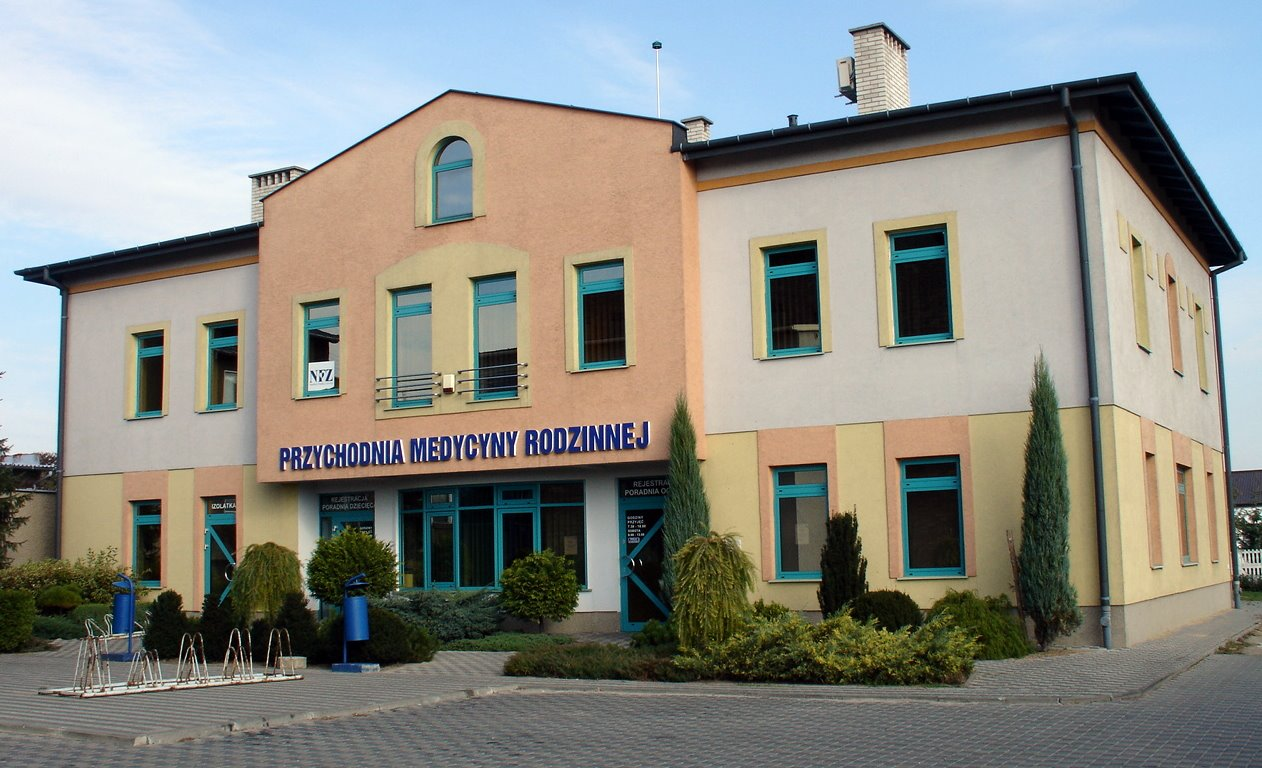
Clinic

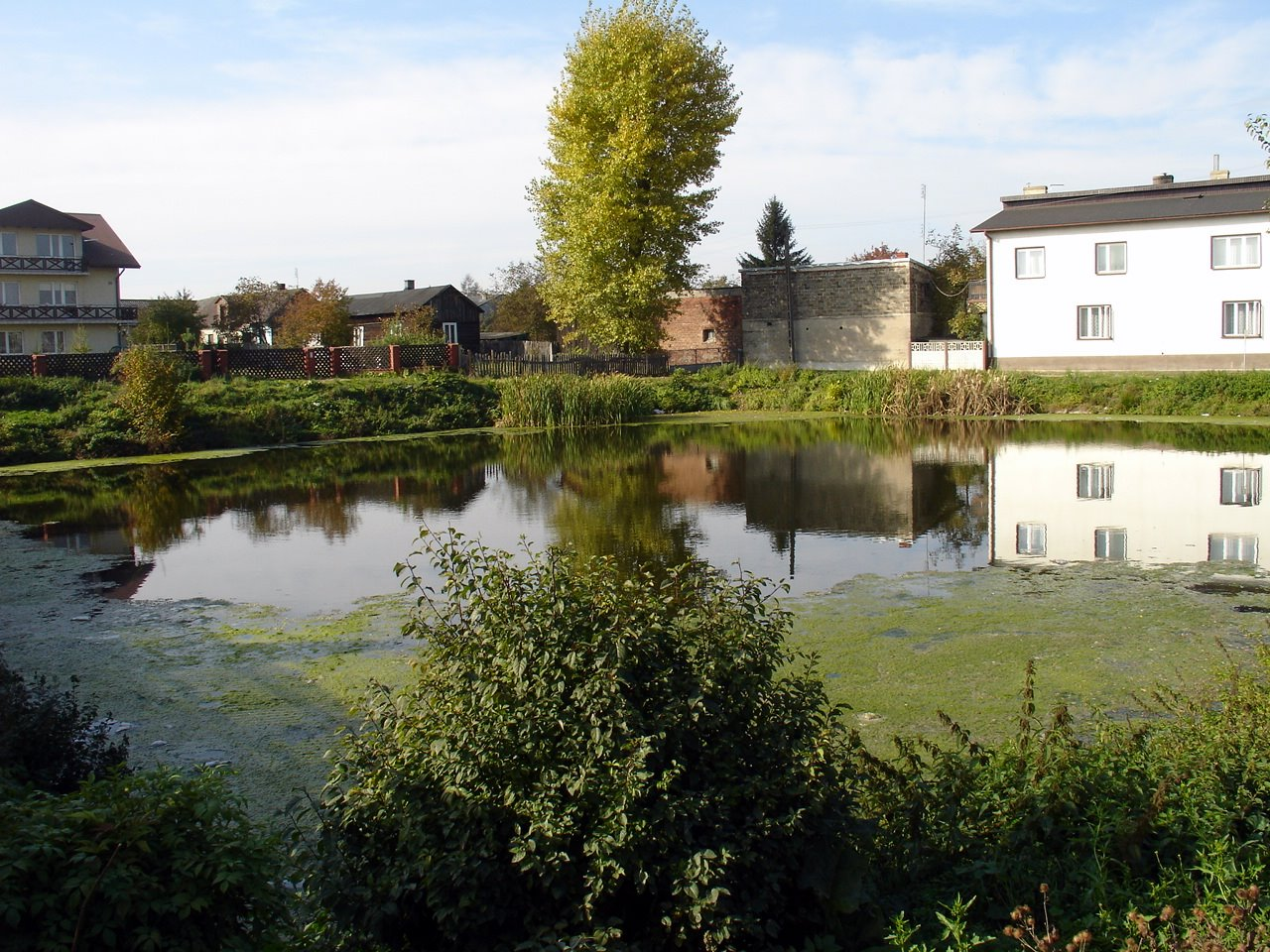
Pond in Kłomnice
