= Konary, Silesian Voivodeship =

Konary
- Village
- Location within Poland
- Coordinates: 50°55′6″N 19°24′25″E
- Country: Poland
- Voivodeship: Silesian
- County: Częstochowa
- Gmina: Kłomnice
- Population: 612

Konary [kɔˈnarɨ] is a village in the administrative district of Gmina Kłomnice, within Częstochowa County, Silesian Voivodeship, in southern Poland.
