= Zdrowa =

- Village
- Location within Poland
- Coordinates: 50°56′N 19°19′E
- Country: Poland
- Voivodeship: Silesian
- County: Częstochowa
- Gmina: Kłomnice
- Population: 631

Zdrowa [ˈzdrɔva] is a village in the administrative district of Gmina Kłomnice, within Częstochowa County, Silesian Voivodeship, in southern Poland.
