= Zawada, Gmina Kłomnice =

Zawada
- Village
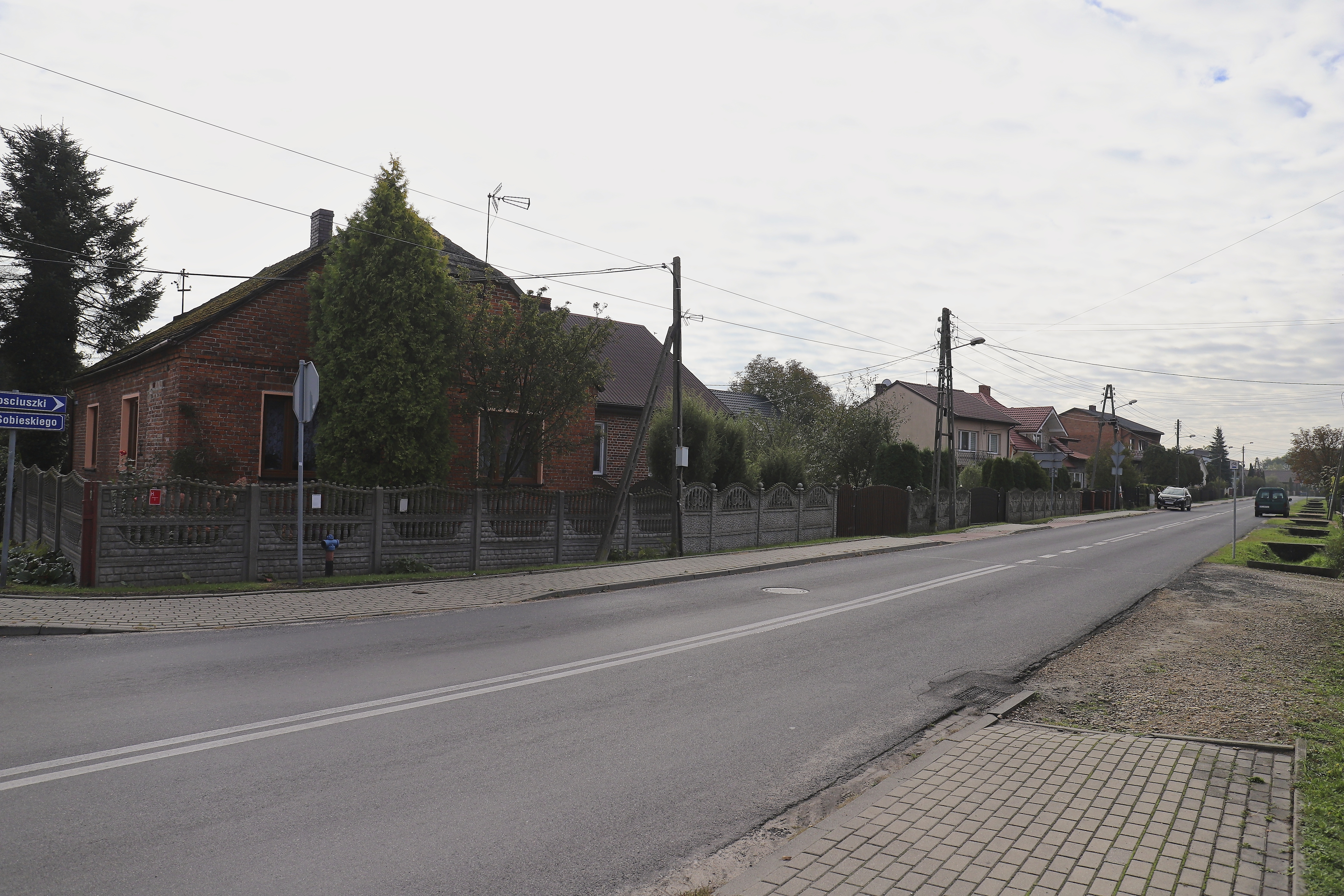

- Location within Poland
- Coordinates: 50°56′12″N 19°25′29″E
- Country: Poland
- Voivodeship: Silesian
- County: Częstochowa
- Gmina: Kłomnice
- Population: 872

Zawada [zaˈvada] is a village in the administrative district of Gmina Kłomnice, within Częstochowa County, Silesian Voivodeship, in southern Poland.
