= Rzeki Małe =

- Village
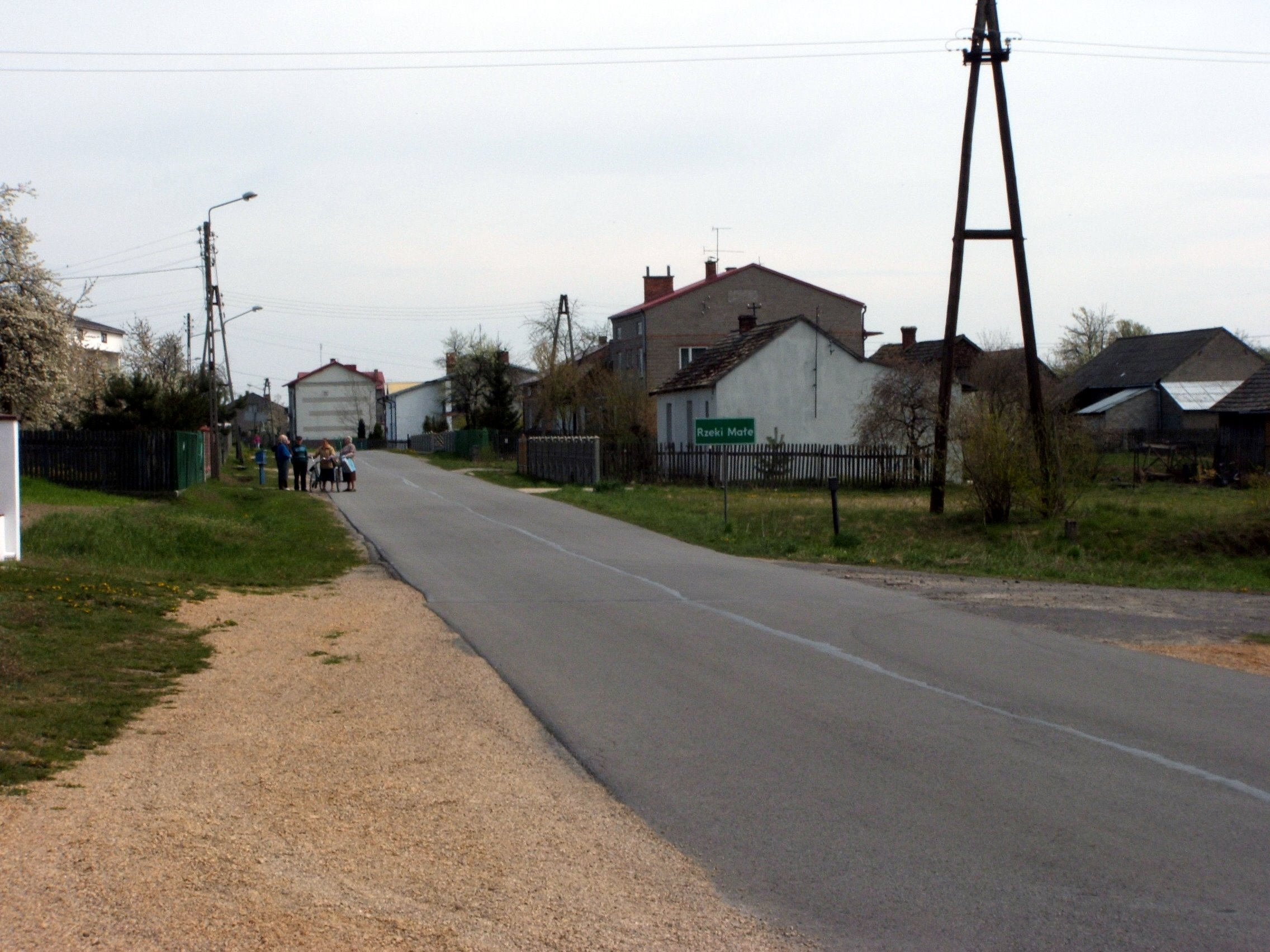

- Location within Poland
- Coordinates: 50°52′N 19°24′E
- Country: Poland
- Voivodeship: Silesian
- County: Częstochowa
- Gmina: Kłomnice
- Population: 299
- Website: http://www.rzeki.republika.pl/

Rzeki Małe [ˈʐɛki ˈmawɛ] is a village in the administrative district of Gmina Kłomnice, within Częstochowa County, Silesian Voivodeship, in southern Poland.
