= Pacierzów =

- Village
- Location within Poland
- Coordinates: 50°54′N 19°24′E
- Country: Poland
- Voivodeship: Silesian
- County: Częstochowa
- Gmina: Kłomnice
- Population: 516

Pacierzów [paˈt͡ɕɛʐuf] is a village in the administrative district of Gmina Kłomnice, within Częstochowa County, Silesian Voivodeship, in southern Poland.
