= Rzerzęczyce =

- Village
- Location within Poland
- Coordinates: 50°53′N 19°19′E
- Country: Poland
- Voivodeship: Silesian
- County: Częstochowa
- Gmina: Kłomnice
- Population: 1,796

Rzerzęczyce [ʐɛʐɛnˈt͡ʂɨt͡sɛ] is a village in the administrative district of Gmina Kłomnice, within Częstochowa County, Silesian Voivodeship, in southern Poland. From 1975 to 1998 it was in Częstochowa Voivodeship.
