= Witkowice, Silesian Voivodeship =

Witkowice
- Village
- Location within Poland
- Coordinates: 50°54′N 19°18′E
- Country: Poland
- Voivodeship: Silesian
- County: Częstochowa
- Gmina: Kłomnice
- Population: 645

Witkowice [vitkɔˈvit͡sɛ] is a village in the administrative district of Gmina Kłomnice, within Częstochowa County, Silesian Voivodeship, in southern Poland.
