= Niwki, Silesian Voivodeship =

Niwki
- Village
- Location within Poland
- Coordinates: 50°53′20″N 19°19′0″E
- Country: Poland
- Voivodeship: Silesian
- County: Częstochowa
- Gmina: Kłomnice
- Population: 121

Niwki [ˈnifki] is a village in the administrative district of Gmina Kłomnice, within Częstochowa County, Silesian Voivodeship, in southern Poland.
