= Michałów Rudnicki =

- Village
- Location within Poland
- Coordinates: 50°53′27″N 19°16′37″E
- Country: Poland
- Voivodeship: Silesian
- County: Częstochowa
- Gmina: Kłomnice
- Population: 146

Michałów Rudnicki [miˈxawuf rudˈnit͡ski] is a village in the administrative district of Gmina Kłomnice, within Częstochowa County, Silesian Voivodeship, in southern Poland.
