= Michałów, Gmina Kłomnice =

Michałów
- Village
- Location within Poland
- Coordinates: 50°54′34″N 19°21′41″E
- Country: Poland
- Voivodeship: Silesian
- County: Częstochowa
- Gmina: Kłomnice
- Population: 174

Michałów [miˈxawuf] is a village in the administrative district of Gmina Kłomnice, within Częstochowa County, Silesian Voivodeship, in southern Poland.
