= Nieznanice =

- Village
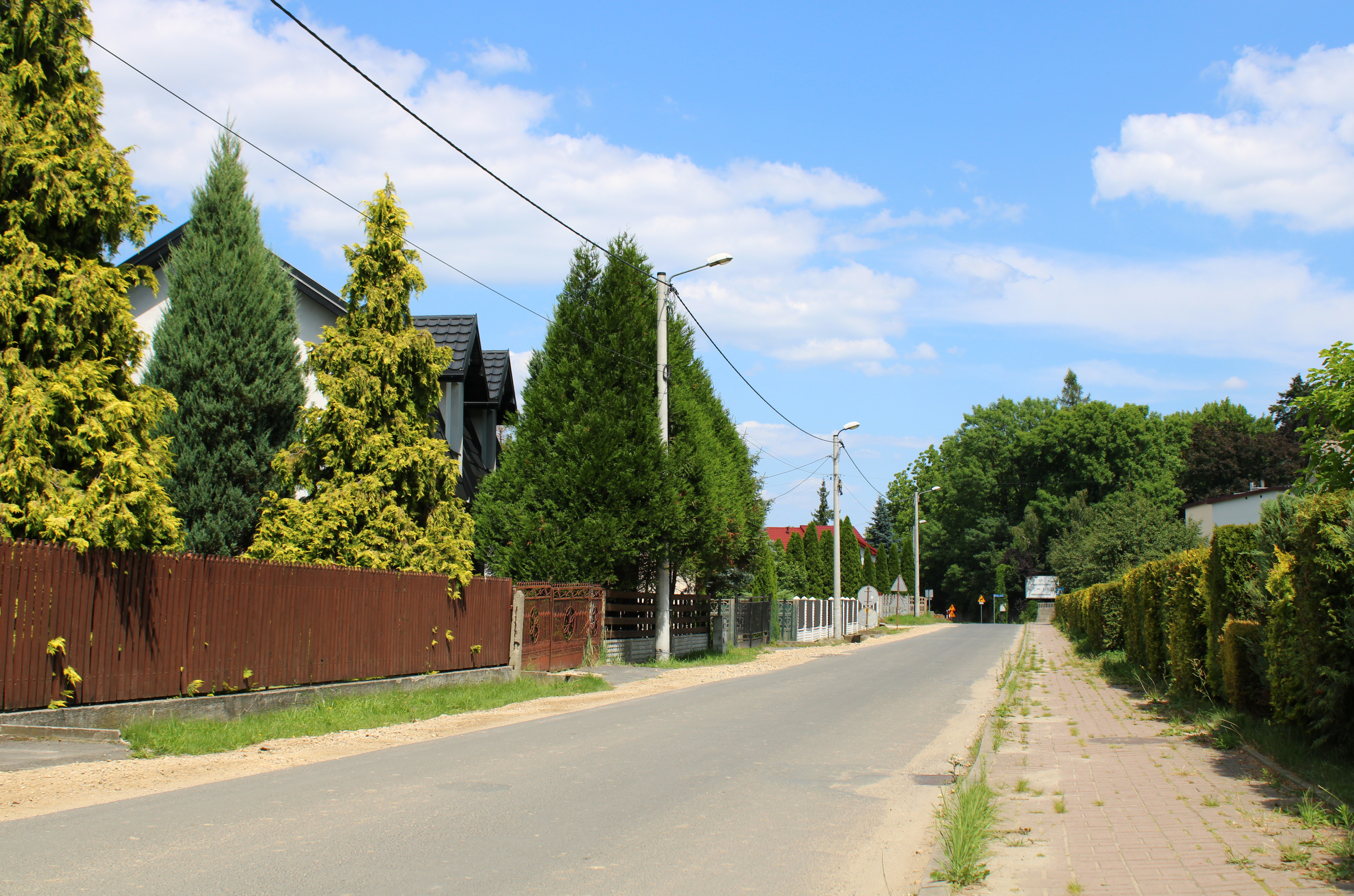

- Location within Poland
- Coordinates: 50°55′N 19°18′E
- Country: Poland
- Voivodeship: Silesian
- County: Częstochowa
- Gmina: Kłomnice
- Population: 557

Nieznanice [ɲɛznaˈnit͡sɛ] is a village in the administrative district of Gmina Kłomnice, within Częstochowa County, Silesian Voivodeship, in southern Poland. The population is 557 as of a 2021 Census.
