= Huby, Silesian Voivodeship =

Huby
- Village
- Location within Poland
- Coordinates: 50°52′N 19°21′E
- Country: Poland
- Voivodeship: Silesian
- County: Częstochowa
- Gmina: Kłomnice
- Population: 101

Huby [ˈxubɨ] is a village in the administrative district of Gmina Kłomnice, within Częstochowa County, Silesian Voivodeship, in southern Poland.

On 20 July 2007, an F3 tornado hit by village, and damaged 27 houses. One person was injured.
