= Gmina Kłomnice =

Gmina Kłomnice Kłomnice Commune
- Gmina
- Coat of arms
- Interactive map of Gmina Kłomnice
- Coordinates (Kłomnice): 50°55′25″N 19°21′13″E
- Country: Poland
- Voivodeship: Silesian
- County: Częstochowa
- Seat: Kłomnice

Area
  - Total: 147.85 km^{2} (57.09 sq mi)

Population (2019-06-30)
  - Total: 13,484
  - Density: 91.201/km^{2} (236.21/sq mi)
- Website: https://www.klomnice.pl

Gmina Kłomnice is a rural gmina (administrative district) in Częstochowa County, Silesian Voivodeship, in southern Poland. Its seat is the village of Kłomnice, approximately 22 kilometres (14 mi) northeast of Częstochowa and 79 km (49 mi) north of the regional capital Katowice.

The gmina covers an area of 147.85 square kilometres (57.1 sq mi), and as of 2019 its total population is 13,484.

== Villages ==
Gmina Kłomnice contains the villages and settlements of Adamów, Bartkowice, Chmielarze, Chorzenice, Garnek, Huby, Karczewice, Kłomnice, Konary, Kuźnica, Lipicze, Michałów, Michałów Rudnicki, Nieznanice, Niwki, Pacierzów, Rzeki Małe, Rzeki Wielkie, Rzerzęczyce, Skrzydlów, Śliwaków, Witkowice, Zawada and Zdrowa.

== Neighbouring gminas ==
Gmina Kłomnice is bordered by the gminas of Dąbrowa Zielona, Gidle, Kruszyna, Mstów, Mykanów and Rędziny.
