= Woodland, Missouri =

Unincorporated community in Missouri, U.S.

Coordinates: 39°45′10″N 91°35′38″W

Woodland is an unincorporated community in Marion County, in the U.S. state of Missouri.

== History ==
A post office called Woodland was established in 1872, and remained in operation until 1941. The community was named after a nearby private estate of the same name.
