= Rzeki Wielkie =

- Village
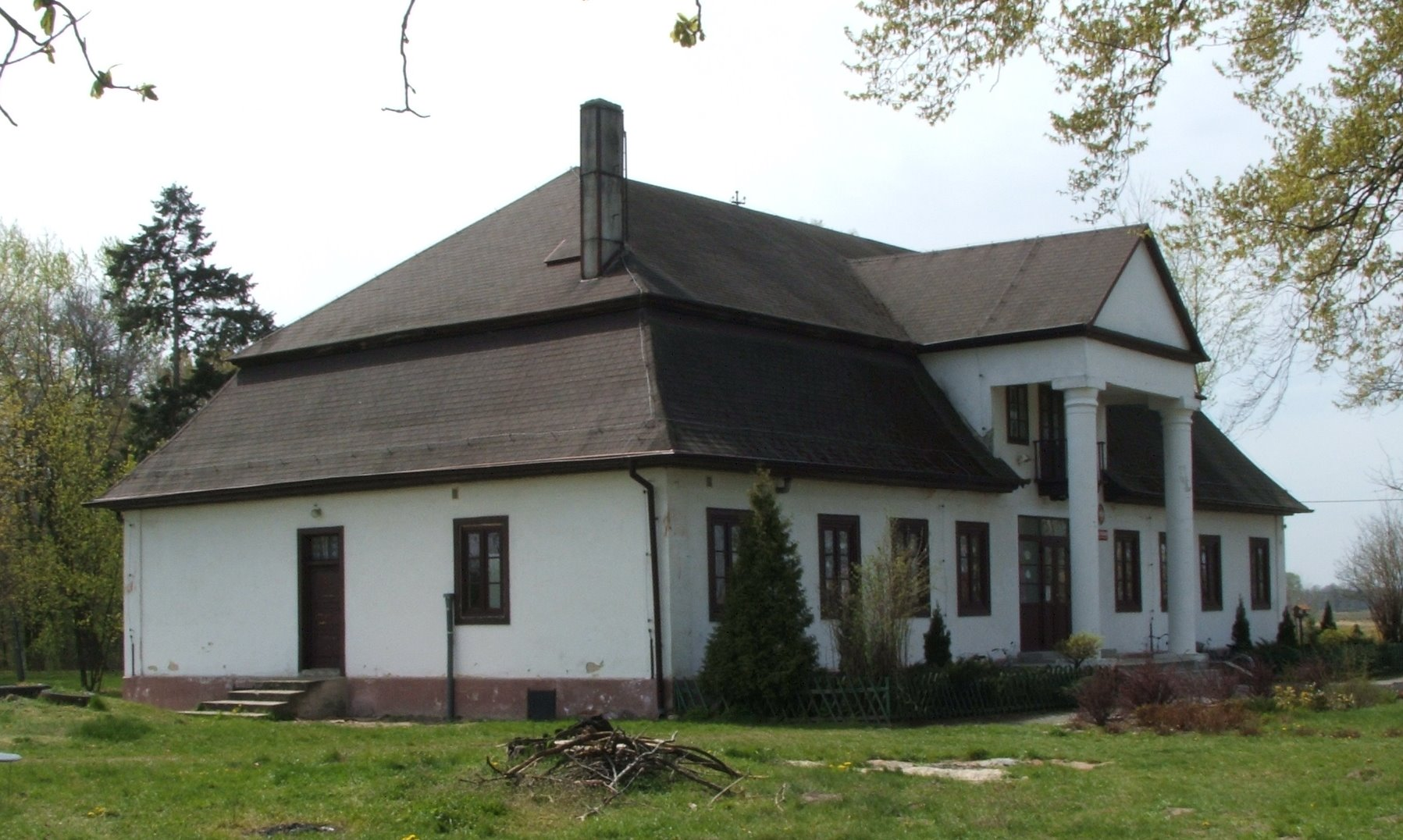
- Manor in the village

- Location within Poland
- Coordinates: 50°52′N 19°23′E
- Country: Poland
- Voivodeship: Silesian
- County: Częstochowa
- Gmina: Kłomnice

Population
  - Total: 379
- Website: http://www.rzeki.republika.pl/

Rzeki Wielkie [ˈʐɛki ˈvjɛlkʲɛ] is a village in the administrative district of Gmina Kłomnice, within Częstochowa County, Silesian Voivodeship, in southern Poland.
