= Adam Szustak =

Polish Roman Catholic priest

Adam Stanisław Szustak OP
- Born: 20 July 1978 (age 48); Myszków, Poland
- Occupation: Preacher

Ecclesiastical career
- Church: Roman Catholic Church
- Ordained: 4 December 2004
- Website: https://langustanapalmie.pl/

Adam Stanisław Szustak (born 20 July 1978) is a Polish Roman Catholic priest, Dominican, itinerant preacher, academic chaplain, vlogger and author.

Since 2014, he has been active on the Internet under the name Langusta na Palmie (Crawfish on a palm tree), which was inspired from one of the mosaics in the Basilica di Santa Maria Assunta in the Aquileia, Italy. As of January 2026, his channel on YouTube has over 970 thousand subscribers and has received over 700 million total views. He is one of the most popular Polish preachers.

== Life ==
He is an only child, the son of Barbara and Jan (both of whom died in 2023).

He attended the Major Henryk Sucharski High School in Myszków. He studied for two years at the Higher Theological Seminary of the Archdiocese of Częstochowa before joining the Dominican Order. He made his first profession in the Order on 18 August 2000, his perpetual vows on 18 April 2004, and was ordained a priest on 4 December 2004. In the same year, he obtained a master's degree from the Dominican College of Philosophy and Theology at the Pontifical Academy of Theology in Kraków, based on a thesis titled "The Trinitarian Economy in the Thought of St. Irenaeus of Lyon," written under the supervision of Henryk Pietras SJ.

In the years 2007–2012 he was a chaplain in the Beczka academic community in Kraków, Poland, and founded the Christian Malak Foundation in 2012. In the same year, he was assigned to a monastery in Łódź and became an itinerant preacher. He currently spends most of his time leading retreats, including retreats held outside of Poland.

In September 2017, he launched a profile on Patronite, the Polish equivalent of Patreon, and since then his account became one of the most popular on the platform with over PLN 57 000 of monthly income and PLN 3.5 million of total revenue as of May 2022.
