= National Archaeological Museum of Aquileia =

- Museo archeologico nazionale di Aquileia
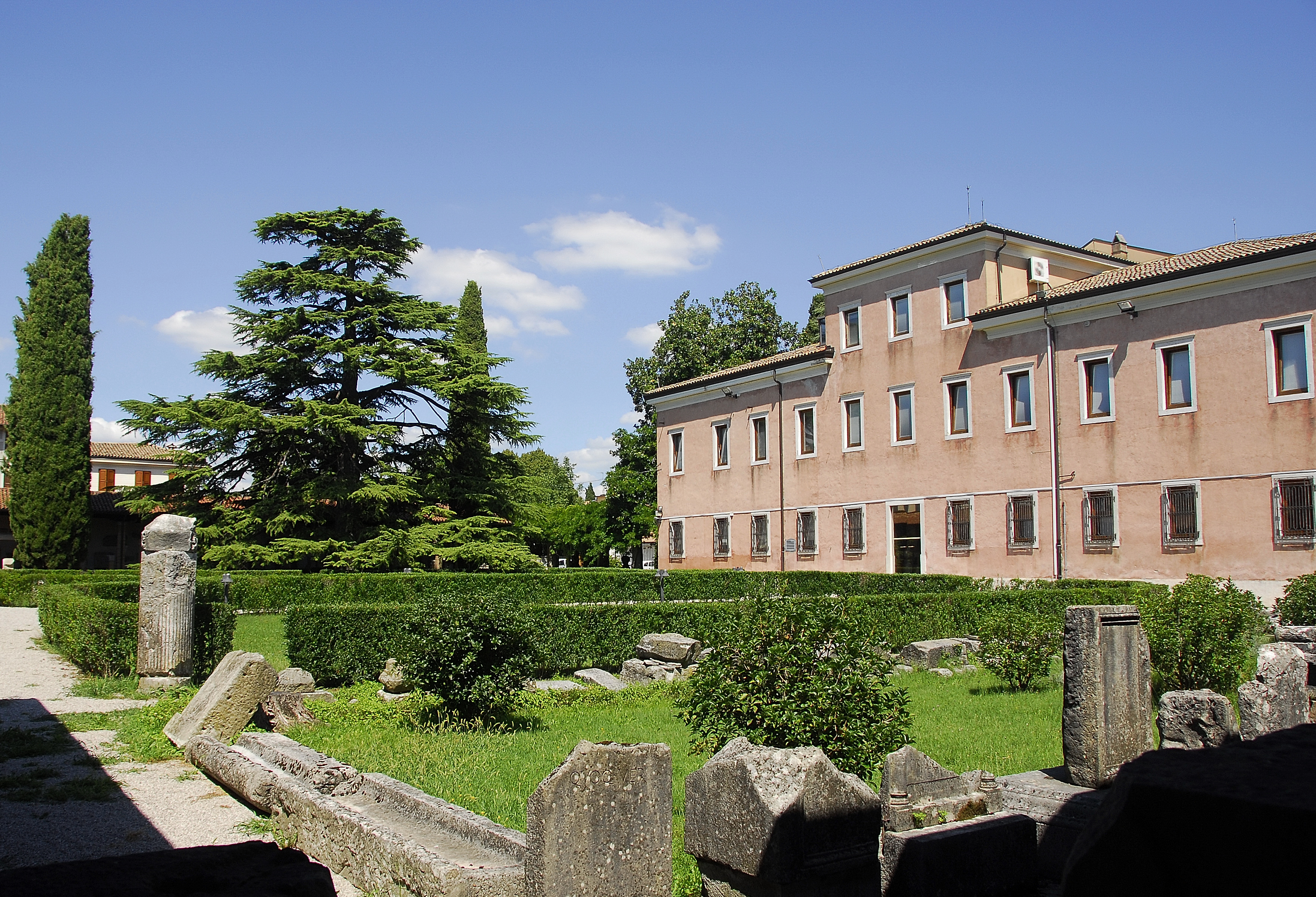
- Location: Aquileia, Italy
- Coordinates: 45°46′03″N 13°22′07″E
- Type: museum

The National Archaeological Museum of Aquileia is a museum in Aquileia, Friuli-Venezia Giulia, Italy. It is one of the largest museums in Italy on Roman civilization. The museum is located at the Cassis Faraone villa and holds collections of statues, household and ornamental furnishings, gems, and coins.

The museum was inaugurated in 1882, building on the private collection of Gian Domenico Bertoli which had been held at via Poppone since the 1700s. The first exhibition of the collection was in 1807 at the baptistery of the Basilica of Aquileia. In 1879 the Bertoli collection was acquired, and expanded the collection. Constructions took place at the gardens of Villa Cassis to accommodate the acquisitions.

== Some excavated items ==
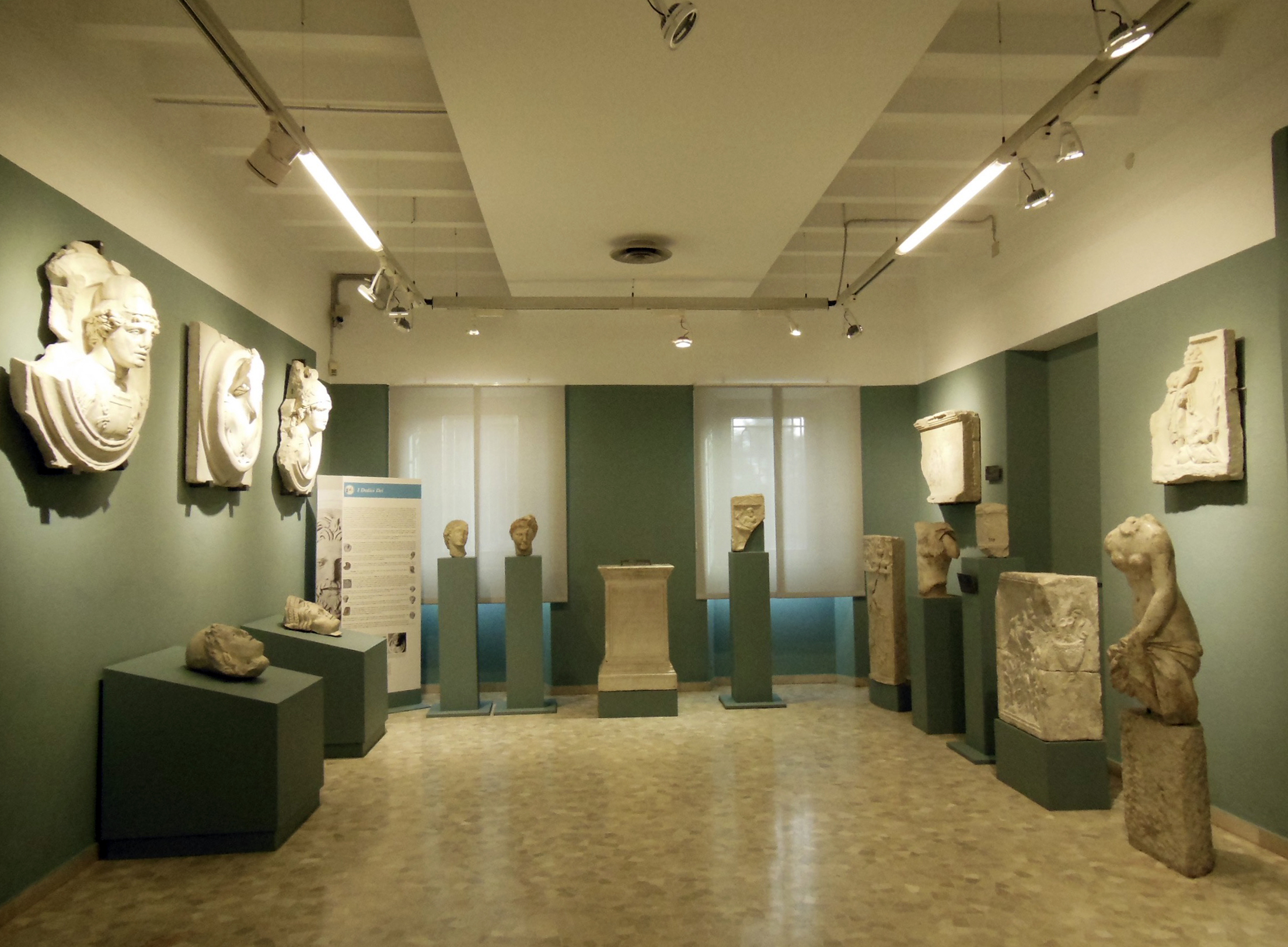
An exhibition room

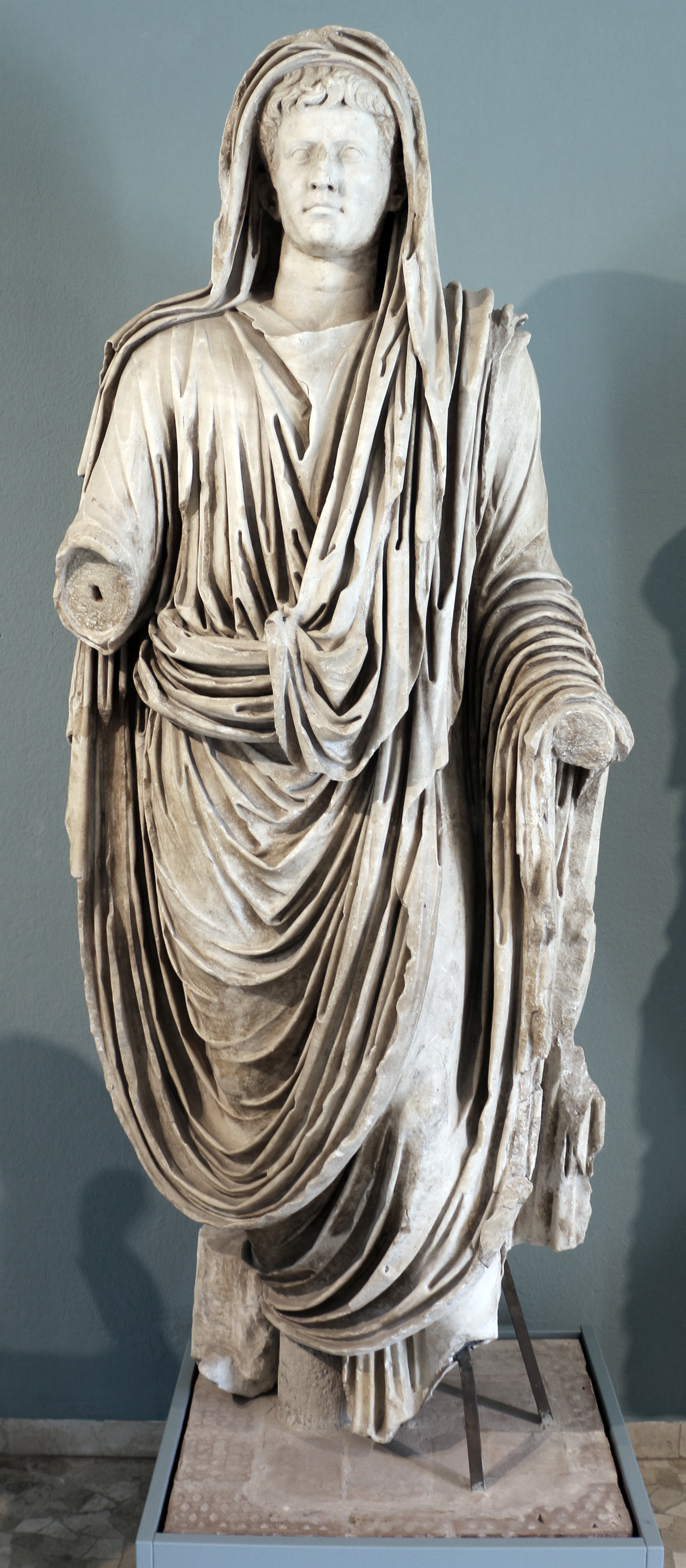
A statue

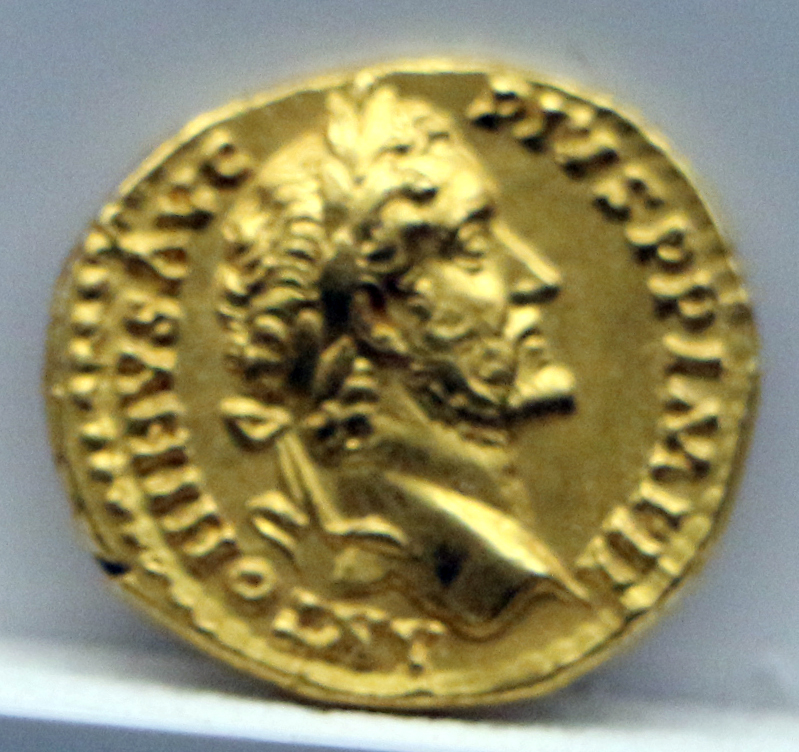
A gold coin

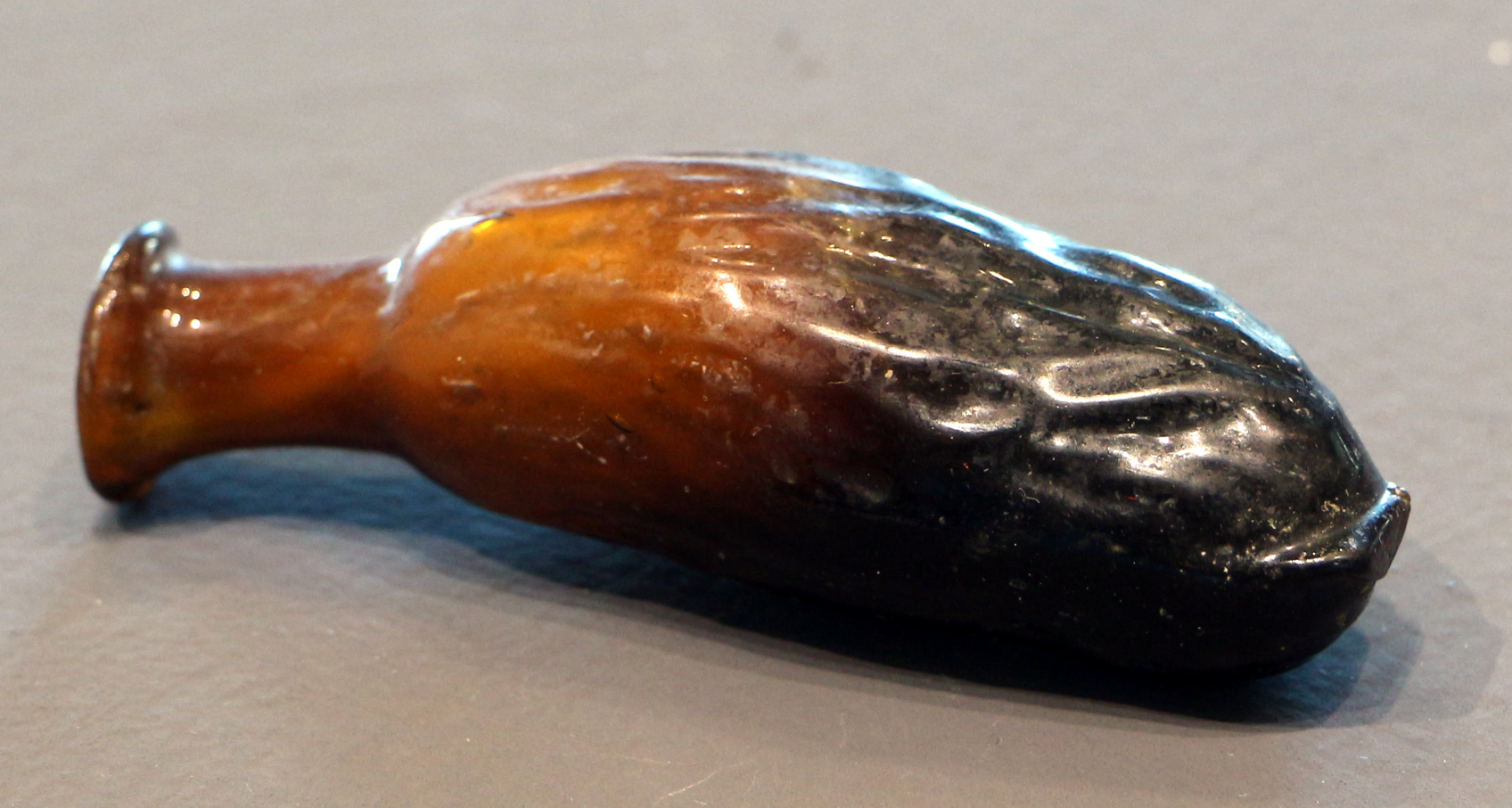
A glass bottle shaped as a date

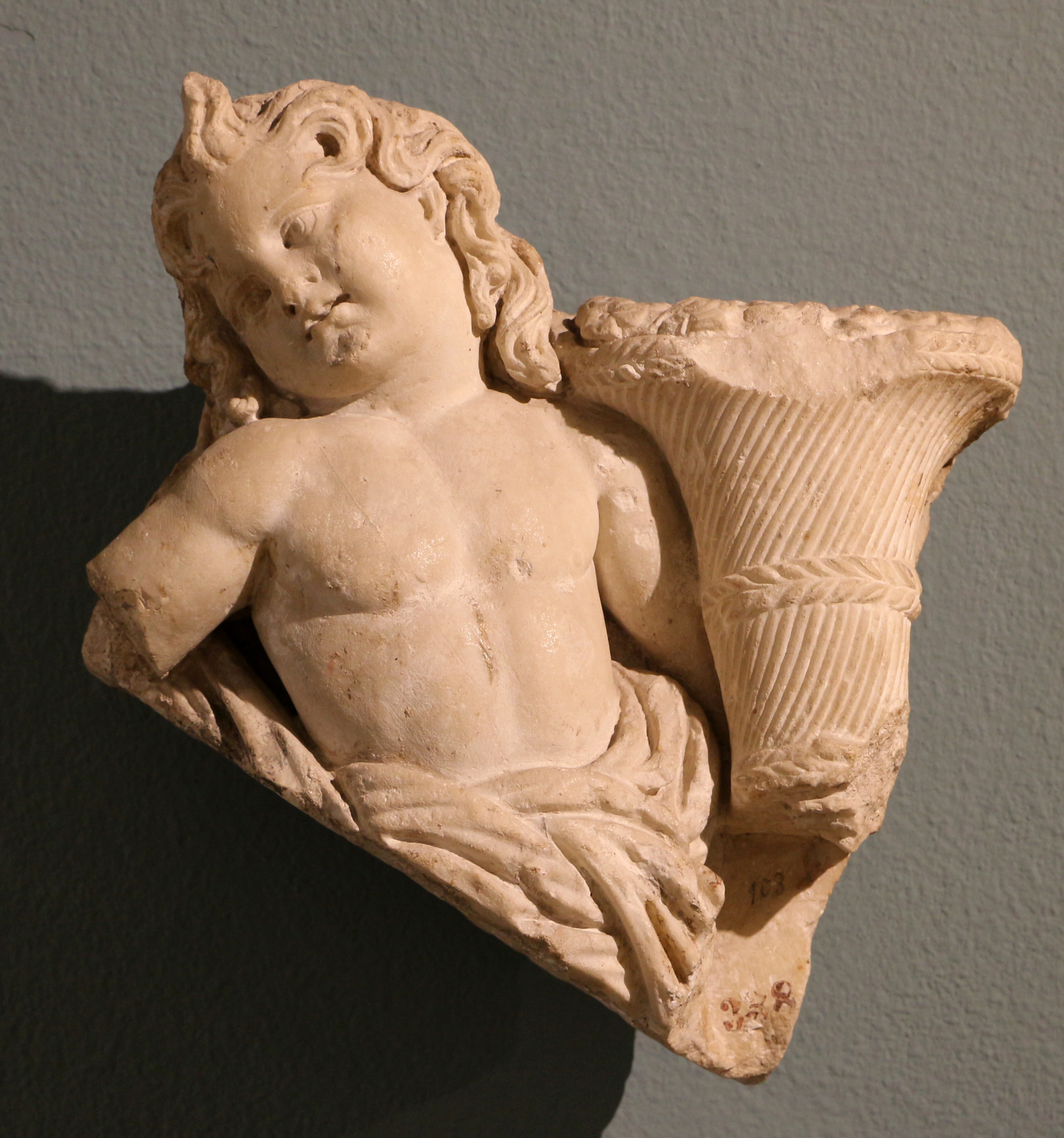
A relief
