= Manor house in Skrzydlów =

- Zespół dworski w Skrzydlowie
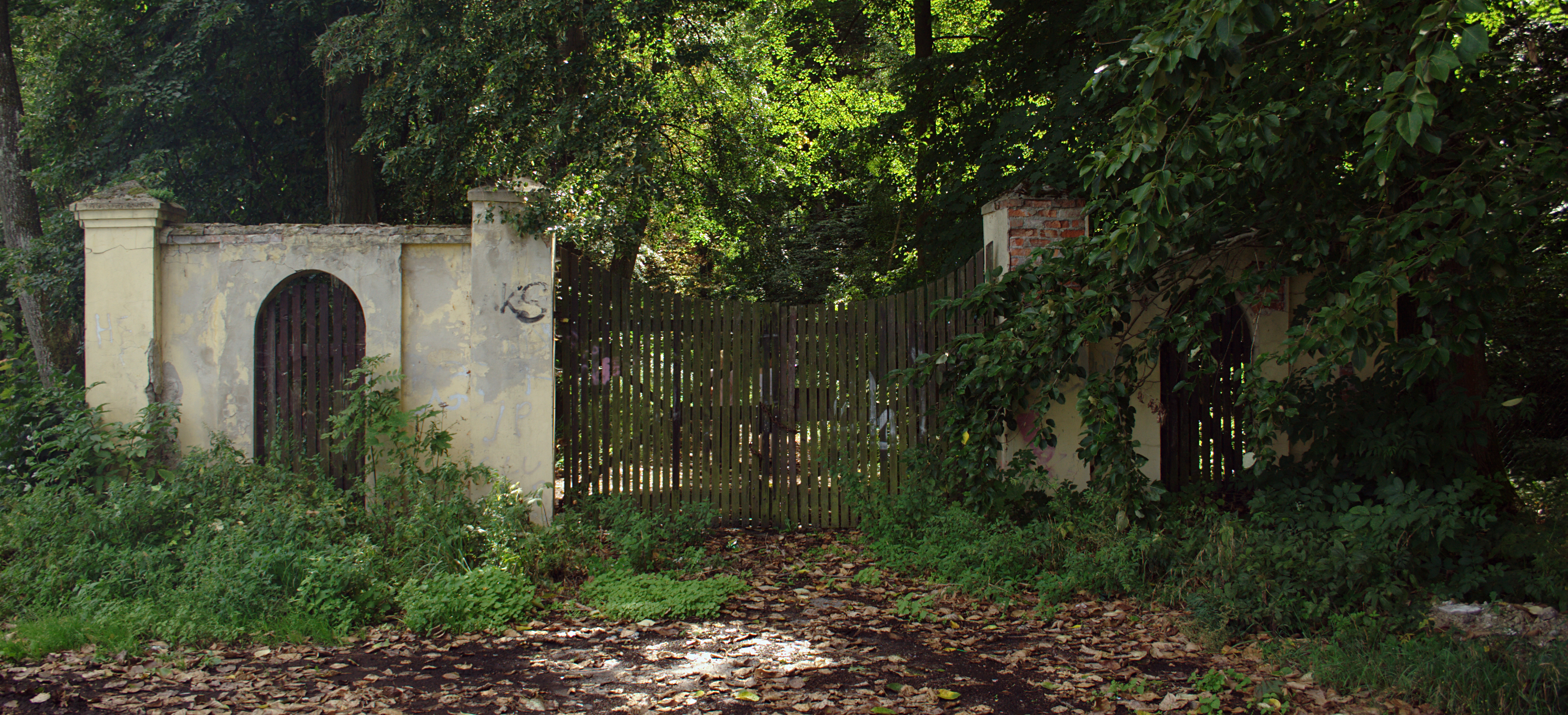
- Fence around the park surrounding the manor

General information
- Architectural style: Polish architecture
- Town or city: Skrzydlów
- Country: Poland
- Coordinates: 50°51′5.7″N 19°21′2.7″E
- Known for: Estate of Jean de Reszke, horse breeding farm

Manor house in Skrzydlów (Polish: Zespół dworski w Skrzydlowie) is a historic property located in Skrzydlów, in the administrative district of Gmina Kłomnice, within Częstochowa County, Silesian Voivodeship, in southern Poland. The estate had a house, guest house, servants' house, and outbuildings.

Built in the mid-19th century, it is a roomy residence of Polish architecture. It was built with thick stone walls, large windows, and high ceilings. The estate was owned by Zofia Siemianska until 1898, when it was purchased by Jean de Reszke (1850–1925), a tenor, who was on tour much of the year. While he was away, his wife lived at the manor occasionally. When he was home, he used the music room in the mornings to work over scores. He displayed photographs and gifts from Queen Victoria, including a large silver tankard that has been said to be the handsomest gift that had given to a guest. He spent the summers at the estate. Anne Marie de Goulaine, his wife, preferred to live in Paris.

Reszke established a horse stud farm there to breed Anglo-Arabian horses. He and his brother Édouard founded the Pławieński Horse Racing Society. The Reszkes liked to hunt—particularly deer and birds—and did so at the Skrzydlów and Garnek estates. Reszke was last at the estate in 1913. It operated as a stud farm until 1999, when the Polish government closed it down.

Located along the Warta River, it is 16 kilometres (9.9 miles) from another Reszke estate, Borowno, where Reszke had a stud farm and a hunting lodge. He and two of his siblings, Josephine and Édouard, all opera stars, bought estates in the Częstochowa area. Their estates were managed by their sister Emilia and her husband Adam Michalski of Borowno.

The brick octagonal chapel, built between 1820 and 1830, was listed with the provincial register of monuments on December 27, 1967. Senator Jarosław Lasecki owned the property in 2014 when the hunting lodge, also called the steward's house, was destroyed by fire. The lodge was more than 100 years old.
