= Myszków =

Town in Silesian Voivodeship, Poland

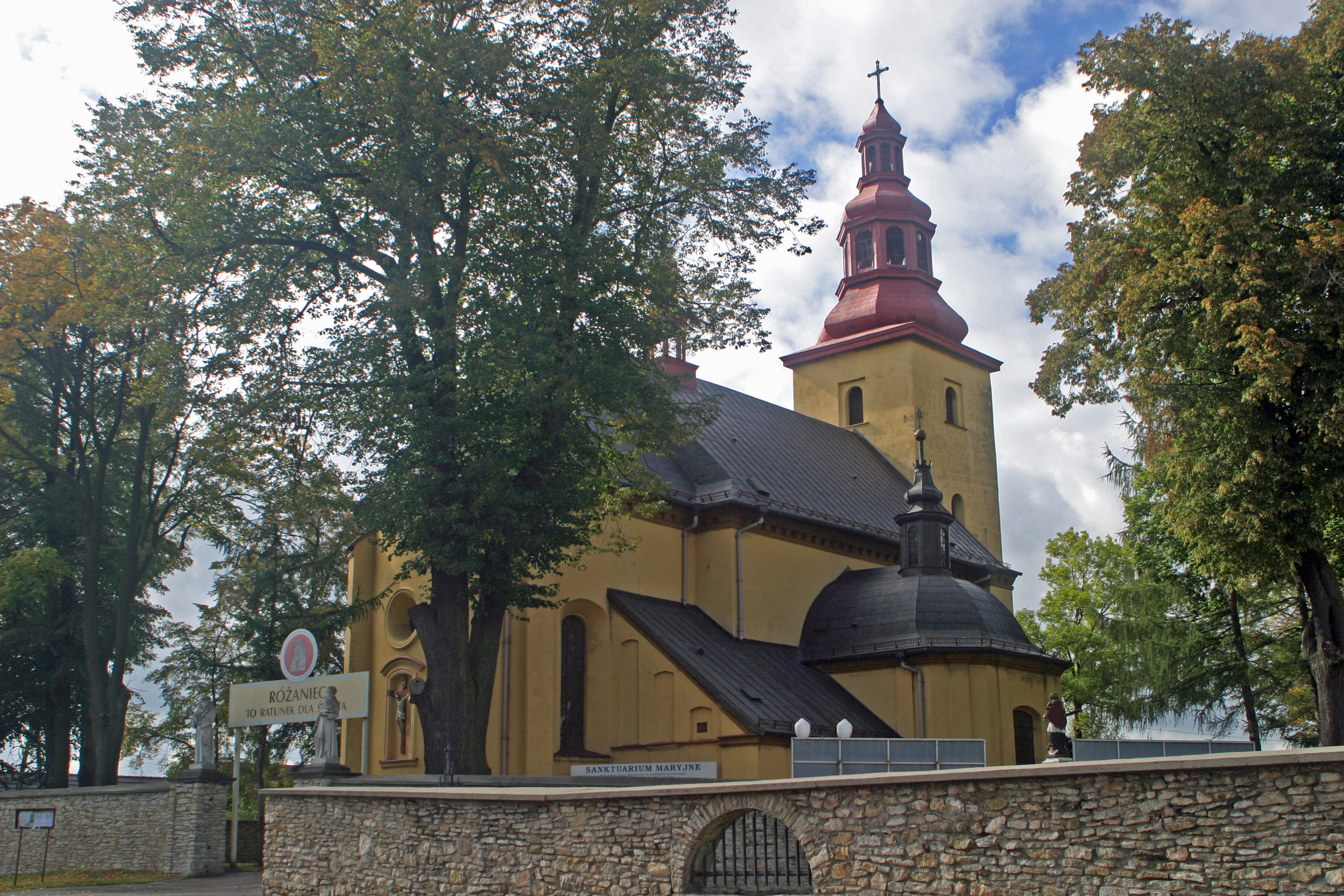
- Church of the Assumption of the Virgin Mary

- Flag Coat of arms

- Location within Silesian Voivodeship Location within Poland
- Coordinates: 50°34′14″N 19°18′52″E
- Country: Poland
- Voivodeship: Silesian
- County: Myszków
- Gmina: Myszków (urban gmina)

Government
  - Mayor: Włodzimierz Żak

Area
  - Total: 73.59 km^{2} (28.41 sq mi)

Population (2019-06-30)
  - Total: 31,650
  - Density: 430.1/km^{2} (1,114/sq mi)
- Time zone: UTC+1 (CET)
  - Summer (DST): UTC+2 (CEST)
- Postal code: 42-300
- Car plates: SMY
- Website: https://www.miastomyszkow.pl/

Myszków [ˈmɨʂkuf] is a town in Poland, with 31,650 inhabitants (2019). Situated on the Warta river in the Silesian Voivodeship, it is the capital of Myszków County. Myszków historically belongs to Lesser Poland, and the area where the town is located was, until the Partitions of Poland, part of Kraków Voivodeship's County of Lelów. Myszków is located along one of the oldest Polish rail lines, the Warsaw–Vienna railway, and near the Central Rail Line.

== Coat of arms ==
Myszków has for years been a center of heavy industry, which is reflected in the town's coat of arms. Created in 1969, it shows four black smokestacks, with fumes coming from the two in the middle. Above the smokestacks is the White Eagle, on the sides are two heads of corn, and the blue ribbon symbolizes the Warta river.

== Geography ==
Myszków occupies the area of 73.59 square kilometres (28.41 sq mi), of which 56% is arable land, and 22% forests. Since 1925 it has been the seat of a gmina, but Myszków officially remained a village until 1950, when it received town charter. Today's Myszków is made of a number of former villages, towns and settlements (Mrzygłód, Nowa Wieś, Pohulanka, Będusz, Helenówka, Myszków, Mijaczów, Ciszówka), which had existed here for centuries. The town is located on the elevation of 280 meters above sea level, in a valley between Silesian Highlands and Polish Jura, and some of its districts are part of the Jura Landscape Parks. Myszków is characteristic for its settlement type of architecture, which is the result of mergers of numerous villages into its borders.

=== Districts ===
Myszków is informally divided into 22 administrative districts (dzielnica) or boroughs:

- Stary Myszków
- Nowy Myszków
- Mijaczów
- Pohulanka
- Mrzygłód
- Mrzygłódka
- Będusz
- Nowa Wieś
- Gruchla
- Kręciwilk
- Ciszówka
- Czarna Struga
- Helenówka
- Osińska Góra
- Potasznia
- Nierada
- Bory
- Smudzówka
- Labry
- Michałów
- Połomia-Myszków
- Ręby

== History ==
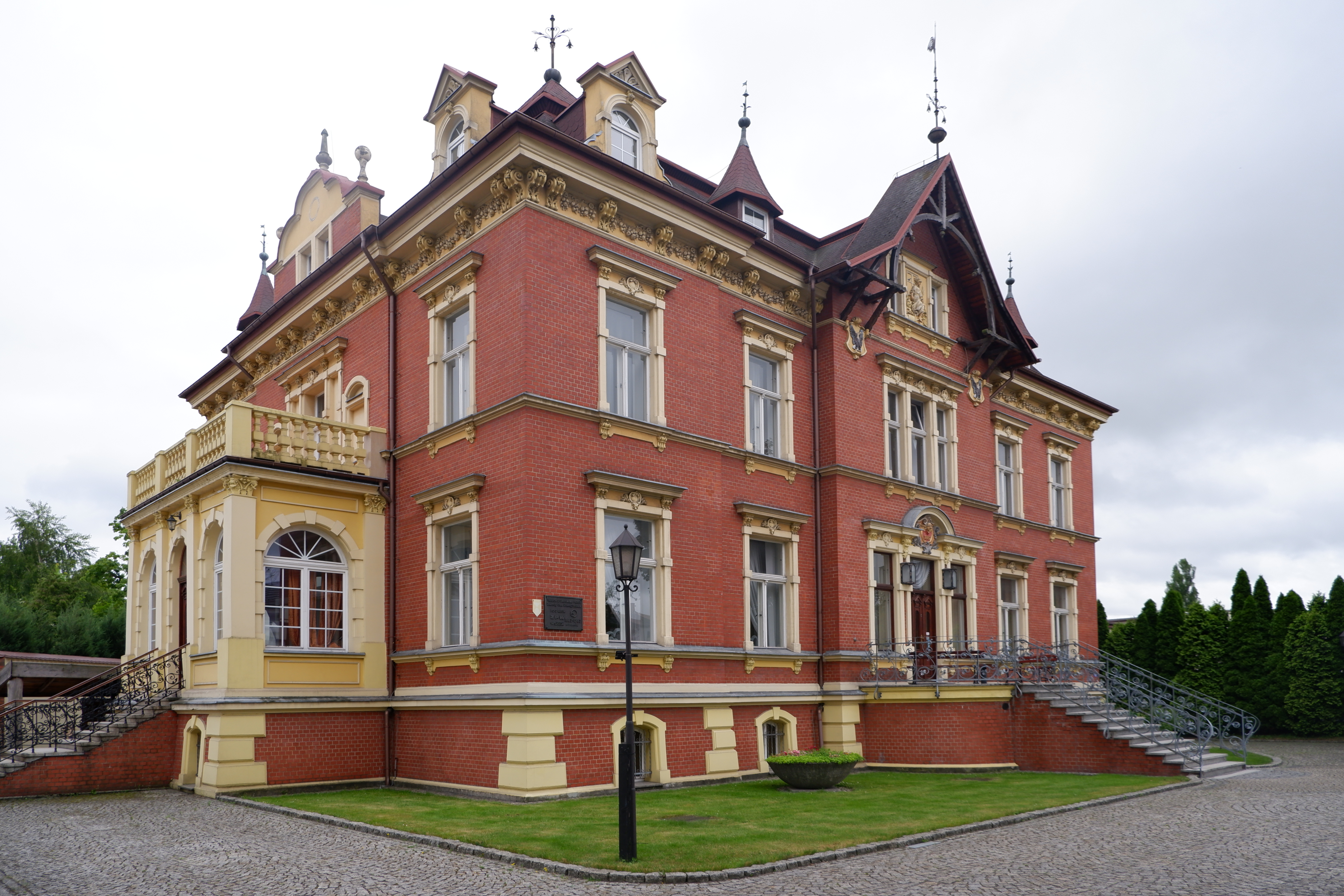
Palace of August Schmelzer (1895)

The history of the town called Myszków is very short, and goes back to 1825, when the commune (gmina) of Myszków was created, part of Kielce Voivodeship.

Following the German-Soviet invasion of Poland, which started World War II in September 1939, the village was occupied by Germany until 1945. The Polish resistance was present in the town. In November 1943, the Union of Retaliation blew up a blast furnace in Myszków.

After World War II (August 1945), Lesser Poland's Myszków was transferred to the Silesian–Dąbrowa Voivodeship, which in 1950 changed name to Katowice Voivodeship. It was incorporated as a town in 1950, and the Myszków County was created in 1956. In 1975 Myszków became part of Częstochowa Voivodeship, and in 1983 the town expanded, when the villages of Potasznia, Mrzygłód, Mrzygłódka, Nierada, Krwciwilk, Ręby, Łabry and Smudzówka were annexed. As a result, currently Myszków covers a large area – it is the 139th most populated town of Poland, but the 50th in terms of territory.

== Sights ==
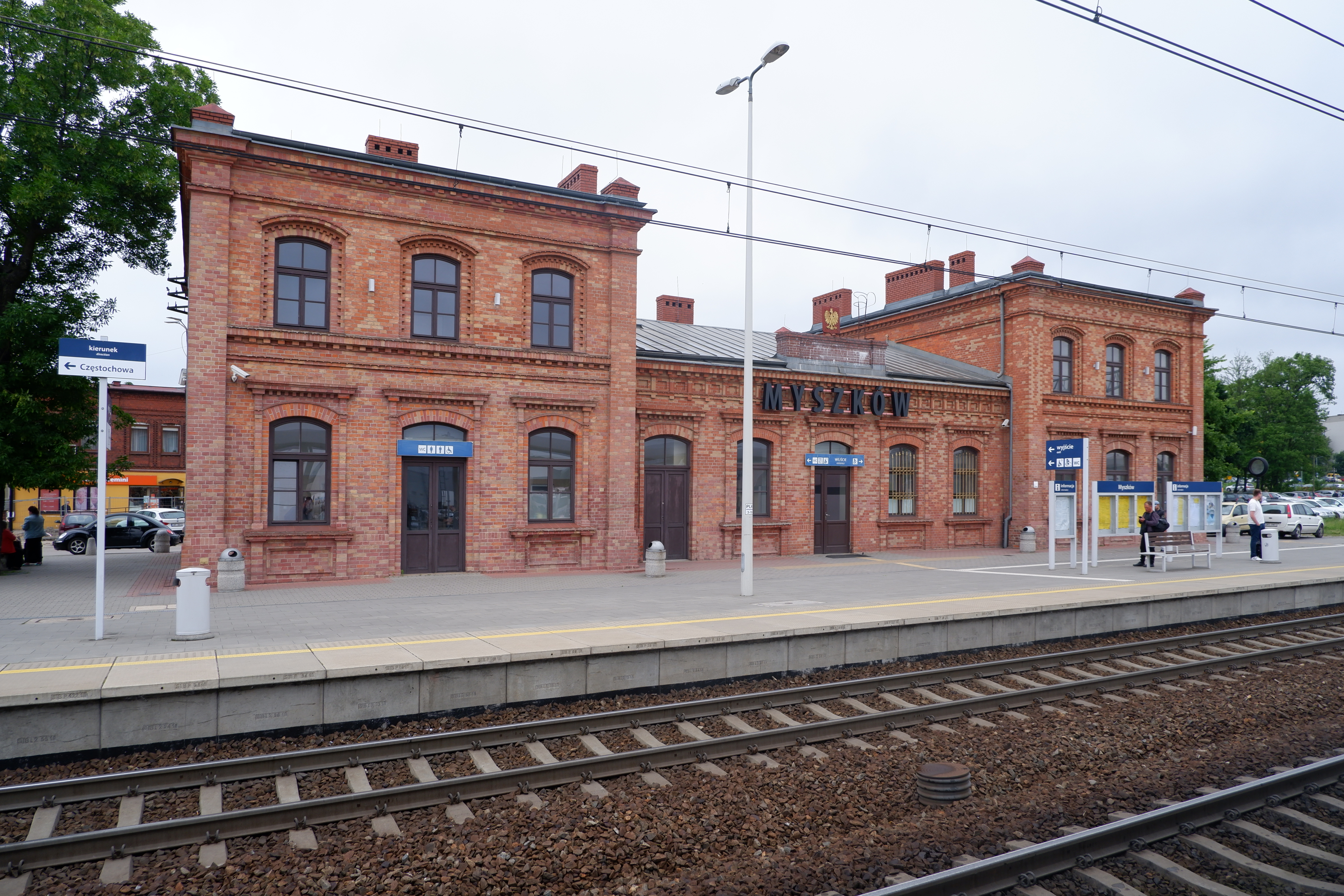
Myszków train station

Among points of interest are the 19th-century rail station, the Palace of August Schmelzer (1880s), and neogothic Church of St. Stanislaus (1908–1936).

== Sports ==
Myszków is home to a sports club MKS Myszków, which was founded in 1947, and whose name changed several times (Jedność, Stal, Papiernik, Krisbut, MŻKS).

== Notable people ==
- Magdalena Cielecka (born 1972), actress
- Jan Kułakowski (1930–2011), Member of the European Parliament
- Jarosław Lasecki (born 1961), senator
- Łukasz Maszczyk (born 1984), boxer
- Włodzimierz Sokołowski (1940–2012), pole vaulter
- Adam Szustak (born 1978), Roman Catholic priest
- Mariusz Trepka (born 1967), Silesian voivode
- Jadwiga Wiśniewska (born 1963), Member of the European Parliament

== Twin towns – sister cities ==
Myszków is twinned with:

- Los Alcázares, Spain
- Békés, Hungary
- Kopřivnice, Czech Republic
- Námestovo, Slovakia
- Zwönitz, Germany
