= Mariusz Trepka =

Polish politician (born 1967)

Mariusz Wiesław Trepka
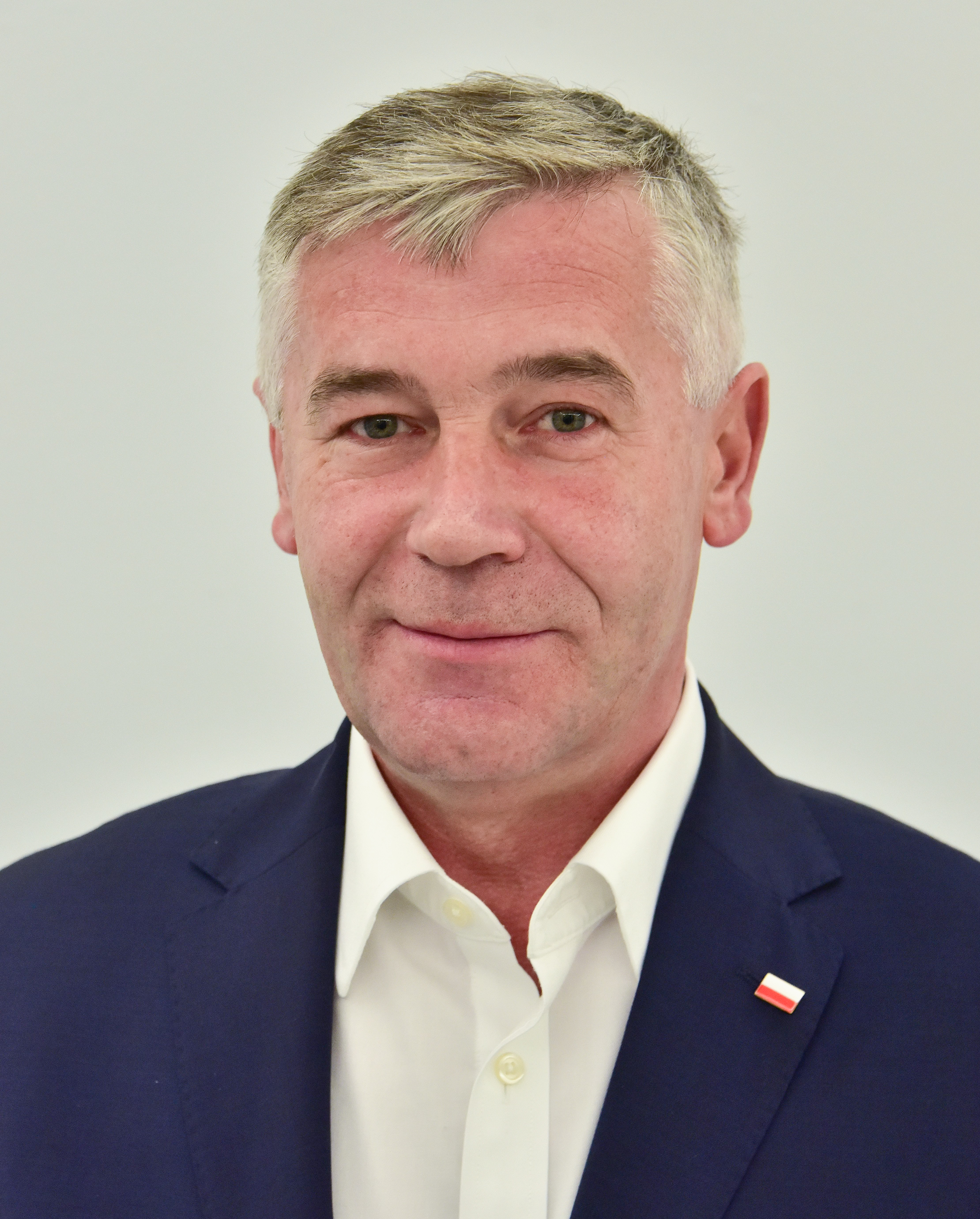
- Trepka in 2019

member of Sejm 2019-2023
- Incumbent
- Assumed office 2018

Personal details
- Born: 6 January 1967 (age 59) Myszków, Poland
- Party: Law and Justice
- Education: Częstochowa University of Technology
- Occupation: Manager, politician

Mariusz Wiesław Trepka (born 6 January 1967) is a Polish politician, local official and manager.

== Biography ==
He graduated from the Częstochowa University of Technology (2011, Management Department). In 2002, 2006, 2010 and 2014 was elected to the Myszków County Council. He was a member of the executive board of the council and from the year 2013, the vice-starosta of the Myszków County. In 2005, he joined the Law and Justice. In 2015, he took part in the parliamentary election from the third place of the PiS list in district 28, gaining 6025 votes and not winning a mandate.

He was appointed in January 2016 as the second vice-voivode of Silesia. In July 2018 he was elected to the Sejm, replacing Konrad Głębocki in the parliament. In the elections in 2019, he was again a candidate to the Sejm from the Częstochowa district. Trepka was elected, receiving 12,881 votes.
