= Jarosław Lasecki =

Polish politician, entrepreneur and manager

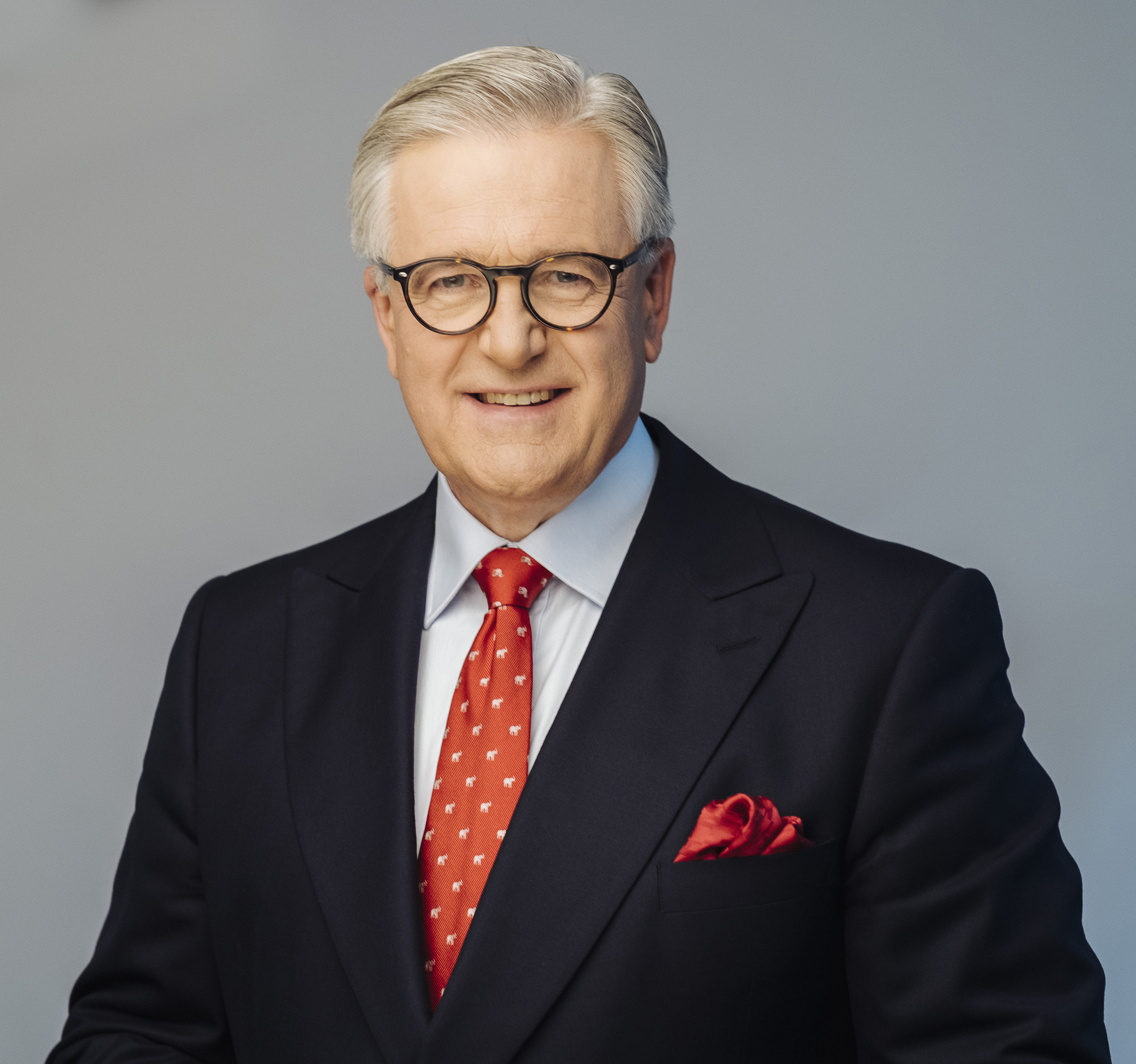

Member of Senate
- In office 2005–2007

Member of Senate
- In office 2011–2015

Personal details
- Born: 1 June 1961 (age 64) Myszków
- Party: Civic Platform

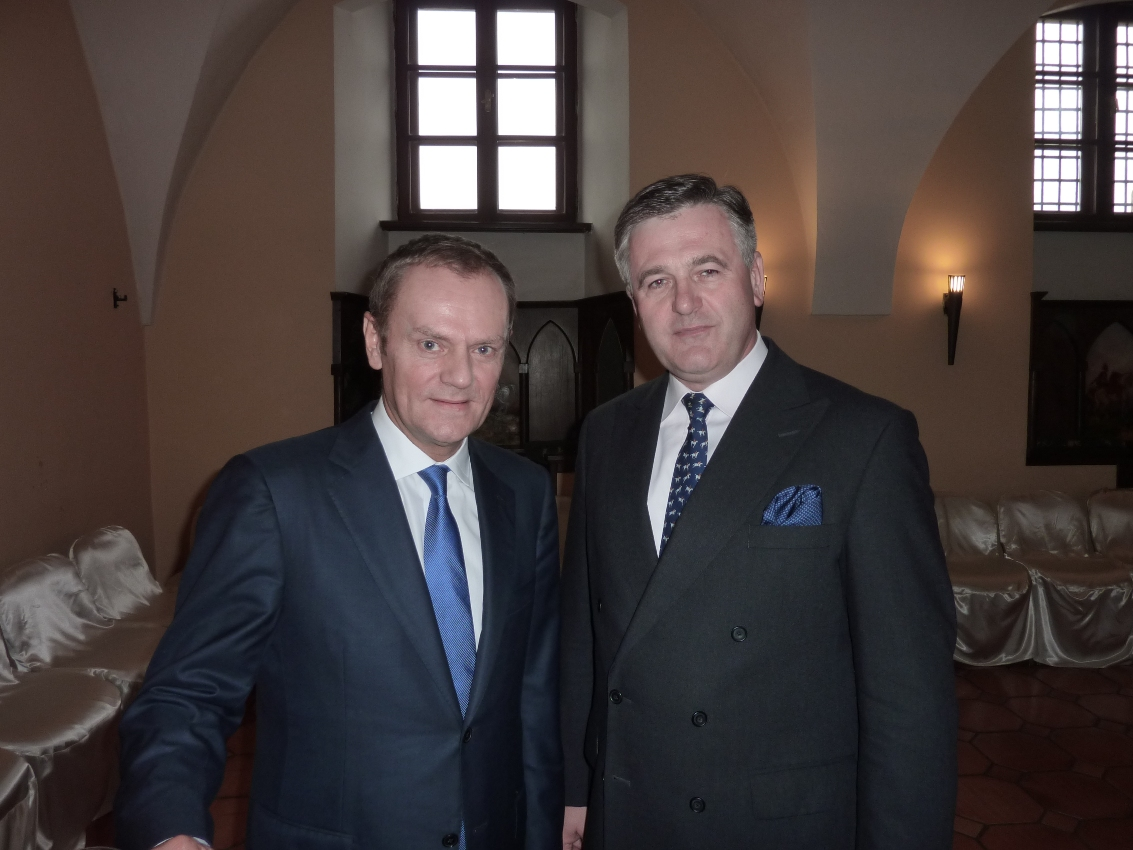
Jarosław Lasecki with Polish Prime Minister Donald Tusk

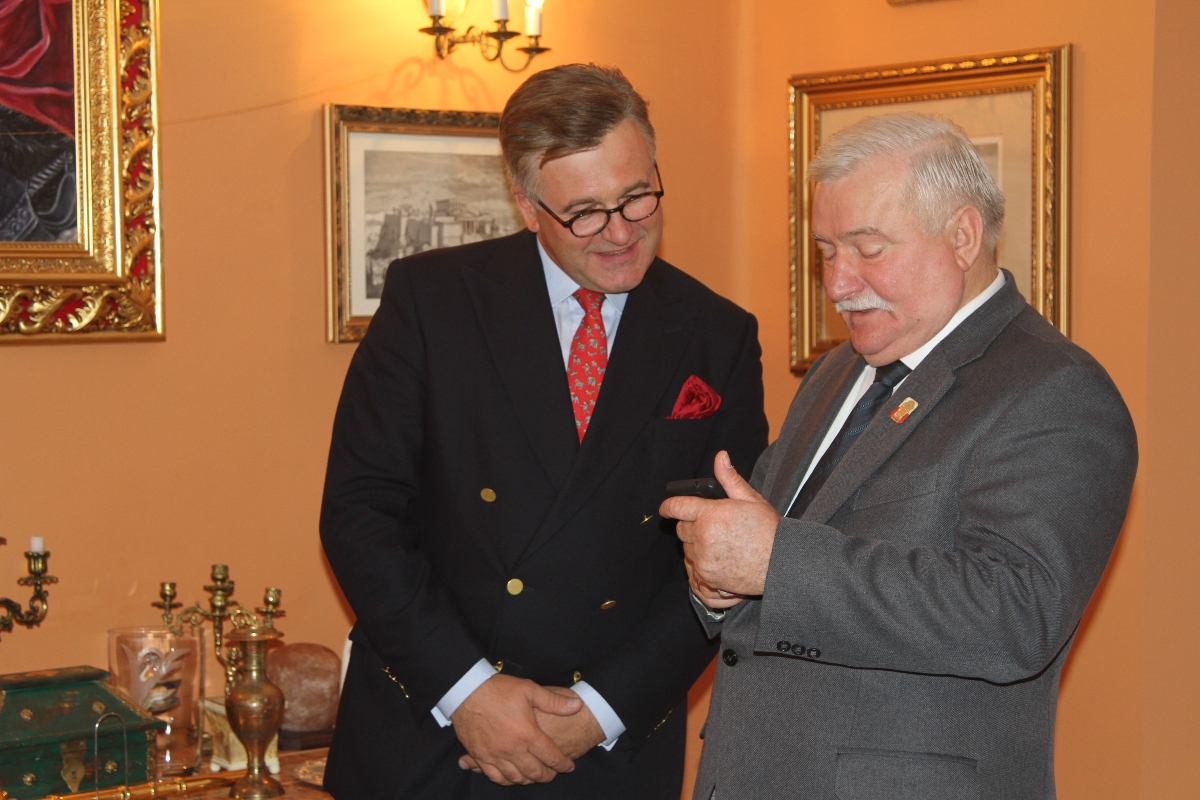
Jarosław Lasecki with President Lech Wałęsa

Jarosław Wacław Lasecki (born 1 June 1961 in Myszków) is a Polish politician, entrepreneur and manager. He was a member of the Senate of the Republic of Poland in 2005–2007 and 2011–2015. He is married and has five children.

== Education ==
Lasecki studied at the Mechanical Department of Kraków's Tadeusz Kościuszko University of Technology, at the German Studies Department of the University of Paderborn (German: Universität Paderborn), and at the Applied Thermodynamics Department of RTWH University in Aachen, and he was a recipient of the Klöckner Foundation scholarship.

== Business ==
From 1990 to 1995, Lasecki worked at the American consulting firm The Boston Consulting Group (BCG) in Düsseldorf and Zurich. In 1995 he created the Plus chain of Polish discount shops (among other positions there, he was chairman of the managing board). Since 2003 he serves as chairman of the managing board of the "Teng" company, which was active in the Commercial Real Estate market.

== Politics ==
Lasecki was elected to the Senate in the Polish parliamentary election, 2005, as an independent candidate for the Częstochowa district. His term was cut short on 19 December 2005 as a result of the decision of the Supreme Court of Poland on 15 December 2005 to nullify the elections in the district due to faulty ballots. However, on 22 January 2006 he was elected again when new elections were held. He became a member of the Senate's National Economy Commission and the Foreign Affairs Commission. In the elections in 2007, he unsuccessfully sought re-election from his own committee. He has been a member of The Civic Platform (PO – Platforma Obywatelska) since 2009. In 2010 he became a delegate to the national party's convention. In the parliamentary election in 2011 as a PO candidate in district 68 he won the Senate mandate. In the 2015 Polish parliamentary election he was not elected for another term and was defeated by Ryszard Majer. In 2019 he unsuccessfully started in the parliamentary election from the Civic Coalition to the Sejm and did not get elected.

== Philanthropy ==
Lasecki has donated funds to the renovation of the parish church in Żuraw and the reconstruction of the Bobolice Castle and other national monuments. He is the honorary president of the Volunteer Fire Brigade in Żuraw, a member of the Polish Hunting Association, the Association of Managers in Poland, the Chamber of Commerce and Industry, and the Polish-German Chamber of Commerce and Industry.

He was twice selected as a finalist for the Manager of the Year competition in 2000 and 2003, a recipient of the Investor of the Year award (1999) and Patron of Culture (2001), and in 2004 he received the Gold Cross of Merit for service to the Polish Nation.

== Personal life ==
Lasecki is married and has five children.

== See also ==
- Manor house in Skrzydlów
