= Skrzydlów =

- Village
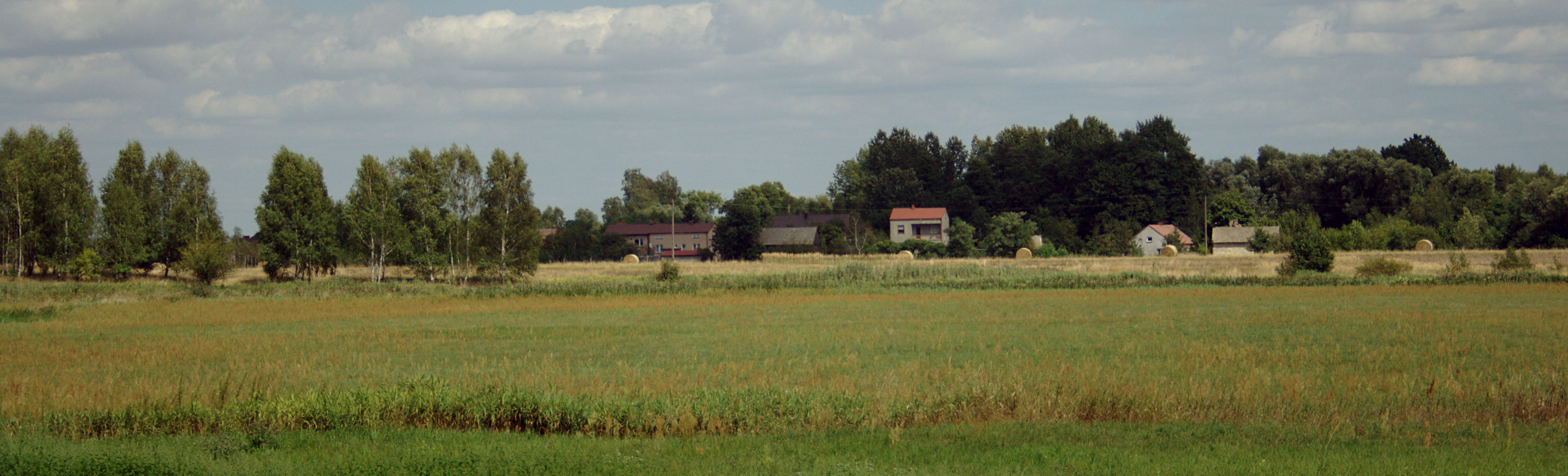

- Location within Poland
- Coordinates: 50°51′N 19°21′E
- Country: Poland
- Voivodeship: Silesian
- County: Częstochowa
- Gmina: Kłomnice
- Population: 844

Skrzydlów [ˈskʂɨdluf] is a village in the administrative district of Gmina Kłomnice, within Częstochowa County, Silesian Voivodeship, in southern Poland.

== See also ==
- Manor house in Skrzydlów
