= Aquileia =

Aquileia Olee / Acuilee (Friulian)
- Comune
- Comune di Aquileia
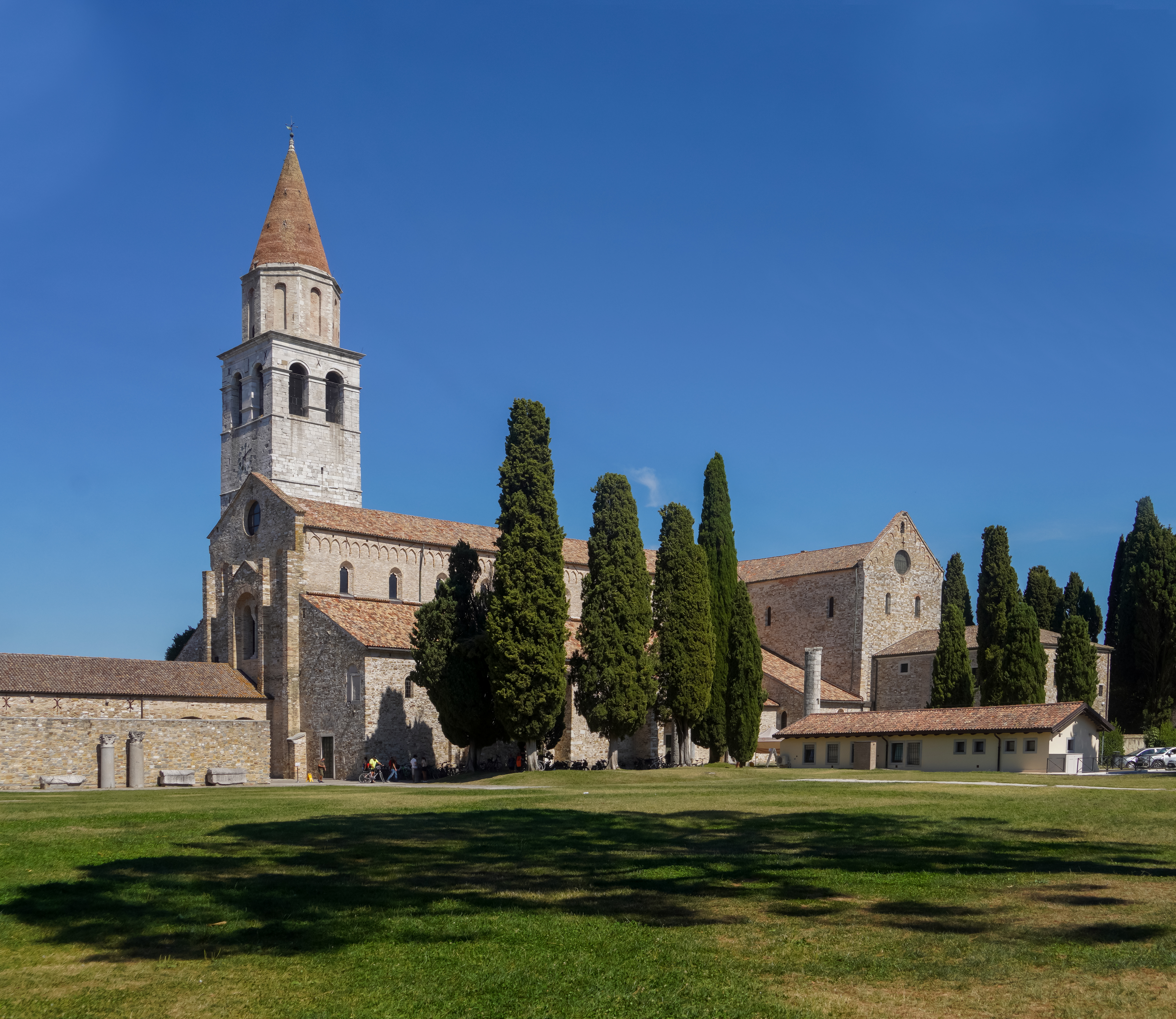
- The Basilica of Aquileia.

- Flag Coat of arms

- Location within Italy Location within Friuli-Venezia Giulia
- Coordinates: 45°46′11.01″N 13°22′16.29″E
- Country: Italy
- Region: Friuli-Venezia Giulia
- Province: Udine (UD)
- Frazioni: Beligna, Belvedere, Viola, Monastero

Government
  - Mayor: Emanuele Zorino

Area
  - Total: 37.44 km^{2} (14.46 sq mi)
- Elevation: 5 m (16 ft)

Population (30 April 2017)
  - Total: 3,302
  - Density: 88.19/km^{2} (228.4/sq mi)
- Demonym: Aquileiesi
- Time zone: UTC+1 (CET)
  - Summer (DST): UTC+2 (CEST)
- Postal code: 33051
- Dialing code: 0431
- ISTAT code: 030004
- Patron saint: Sts. Hermagoras and Fortunatus
- Saint day: July 12
- Website: Official website

UNESCO World Heritage Site
- Official name: Archaeological Area and the Patriarchal Basilica of Aquileia
- Criteria: Cultural: iii, iv, vi
- Reference: 825
- Inscription: 1998 (22nd Session)

Aquileia (Note: UK: /ˌækwɪˈliːə/ AK-wil-EE-ə, US: /ˌɑːkwɪˈleɪə/ AH-kwil-AY-ə, Italian: [akwiˈlɛːja]; Friulian: Olee / Olea / Acuilee / Aquilee / Aquilea; Venetian: Aquiłeja / Aquiłegia; Slovene: Oglej.) is a comune (municipality) in the Friuli-Venezia Giulia region of northeastern Italy. It is situated at the head of the Adriatic at the edge of the lagoons, about 10 kilometres (6 mi) from the sea, on the river Natiso (modern Natisone), the course of which has changed somewhat since the Roman era.

In classical antiquity, Aquileia was a major Roman city with an estimated population close to 100,000 in the 2nd century AD. Founded as a Roman military colony in 181 BC, Aquileia became the capital of the Augustan X region and a metropolitan center for early Christianity. During late antiquity, it was the first city in the Italian Peninsula to be sacked by Attila the Hun.

Today, Aquileia is one of the most significant archaeological sites in northern Italy. Its ruins, including mosaics and an early Christian basilica, are a UNESCO World Heritage Site. Aquileia also holds historical importance as one of the former capitals of Friuli, with its coat of arms being the symbol of the region.

== History ==
=== Classical Antiquity ===
==== Roman Republic ====
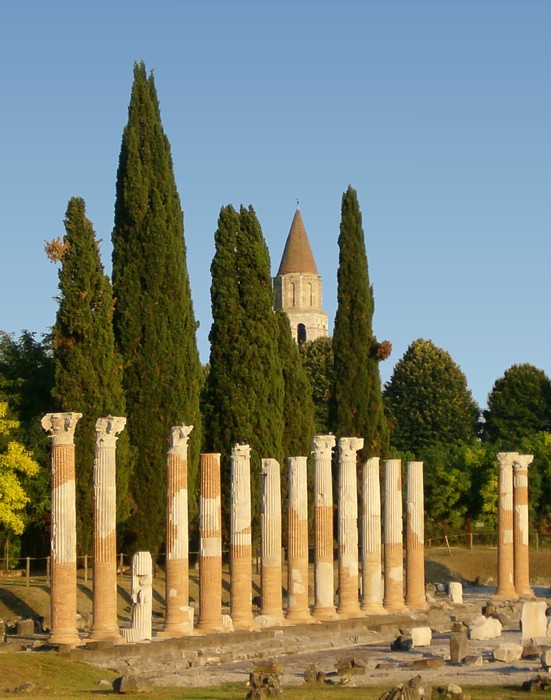
A view of the archaeological area of Aquileia.

Aquileia was founded as a colony by the Romans in 180/181 BC along the Natiso River, on land south of the Julian Alps but about 13 kilometres (8 mi) north of the lagoons. The colony served as a strategic frontier fortress at the north-east corner of transpadane Italy (on the far side of the Po river) and was intended to protect the Veneti, faithful allies of Rome during the invasion of Hannibal in the Second Punic War and during the Illyrian Wars. The colony would serve as a citadel to check the advance into Cisalpine Gaul of other warlike peoples, such as the hostile Carni to the northeast in what is now Carnia and Histri tribes to the southeast in what is now Istria. In fact, the site chosen for Aquileia was about 6 km (3.7 mi) from where an estimated 12,000 Celtic Taurisci had attempted to settle in 183 BC. However, since the thirteenth century BC, the site, on the river and at the head of the Adriatic, had also been of commercial importance as the end of the Baltic amber (sucinum) trade. It is, therefore, theoretically not unlikely that Aquileia had been a Gallic oppidum even before the coming of the Romans. However, few Celtic artefacts have been discovered from 500 BC to the Roman arrival.

The colony was established with Latin Rights by the triumvirate of Publius Cornelius Scipio Nasica, Caius Flaminius, and Lucius Manlius Acidinus, two of whom were of consular and one of praetorian rank. Each of the men had first-hand knowledge of Cisalpine Gaul. Nasica had conquered the Boii in 191. Flaminius had overseen the construction of the road named after him from Bononia (Bologna) to Arretium (Arezzo). Acidinus had conquered the Taurisci in 183.

The triumvirate led 3,000 families to settle the area meaning Aquileia probably had a population of 20,000 soon after its founding. Meanwhile, based on the evidence of names chiselled on stone, the majority of colonizing families came from Picenum, Samnium, and Campania, which also explains why the colony was Latin and not Roman. Among these colonists, pedites received 50 iugera of land each, centuriones received 100 iugera each, and equites received 140 iugera each. Either at the founding or not long afterwards, colonists from the nearby Veneti supplemented these families.

Roads soon connected Aquileia with the Roman colony of Bologna probably in 173 BC. In 148 BC, it was connected with Genua by the Via Postumia, which stretched across the Padanian plain from Aquileia through or near to Opitergium, Tarvisium, Vicetia, Verona, Bedriacum, and the three Roman colonies of Cremona, Placentia, and Dertona. The construction of the Via Popilia from the Roman colony of Ariminium to Ad Portum near Altinum in 132 BC improved communications still further. In the first century, the Via Gemina would link Aquileia with Emona to the east of the Julian Alps, and by 78 or 79 the Via Flavia would link Aquileia to Pula.

Meanwhile, in 169 BC, 1,500 more Latin colonists with their families, led by the triumvirate of Titus Annius Lucius, Publius Decius Subulo, and Marcus Cornelius Cethegus, settled in the town as a reinforcement to the garrison. The discovery of the gold fields near the modern Klagenfurt in 130 BC brought the growing colony into further notice, and it soon became a place of importance, not only owing to its strategic military position, but as a centre of commerce, especially in agricultural products and viticulture. It also had, in later times at least, considerable brickfields.

In 90 BC, the original Latin colony became a municipium and its citizens were ascribed to the Roman tribe Velina. The customs boundary of Italy was close by in Cicero's day. Julius Caesar visited the city on a number of occasions and pitched a winter camp nearby in 59–58 BC.

==== Roman Empire ====
Although the Iapydes plundered Aquileia during the Augustan period, subsequent increased settlement and no lack of profitable work meant the city was able to develop its resources. Jewish artisans established a flourishing trade in glass-work. Metal from Noricum was forged and exported. The ancient Venetic trade in amber from the Baltic continued. Wine, especially its famous Pucinum was exported. Olive oil was imported from Proconsular Africa. By sea, the port of Aquae Gradatae (modern Grado) was developed. On land, Aquileia was the starting-point of several important roads leading outside Italy to the north-eastern portion of the empire — the road (Via Julia Augusta) by Iulium Carnicum (Zuglio) to Veldidena (mod. Wilten, near Innsbruck), from which branched off the road into Noricum, leading by Virunum (Klagenfurt) to Laurieum (Lorch) on the Danube, the road leading via Emona into Pannonia and to Sirmium (Sremska Mitrovica), the road to Tarsatica (near Fiume, now Rijeka) and Siscia (Sisak), and the road to Tergeste (Trieste) and the Istrian coast.

Augustus was the first of a number of emperors to visit Aquileia, notably during the Pannonian wars in 12–10 BC. It was the birthplace of Tiberius' son by Julia, in the latter year. The Roman poet Martial praised Aquileia as his hoped-for haven and resting place in his old age.

In terms of religion, the populace adopted the Roman pantheon, although the Celtic sun-god, Belenus, had a large following. Jews practiced their ancestral religion. Meanwhile, soldiers brought the martial cult of Mithras.

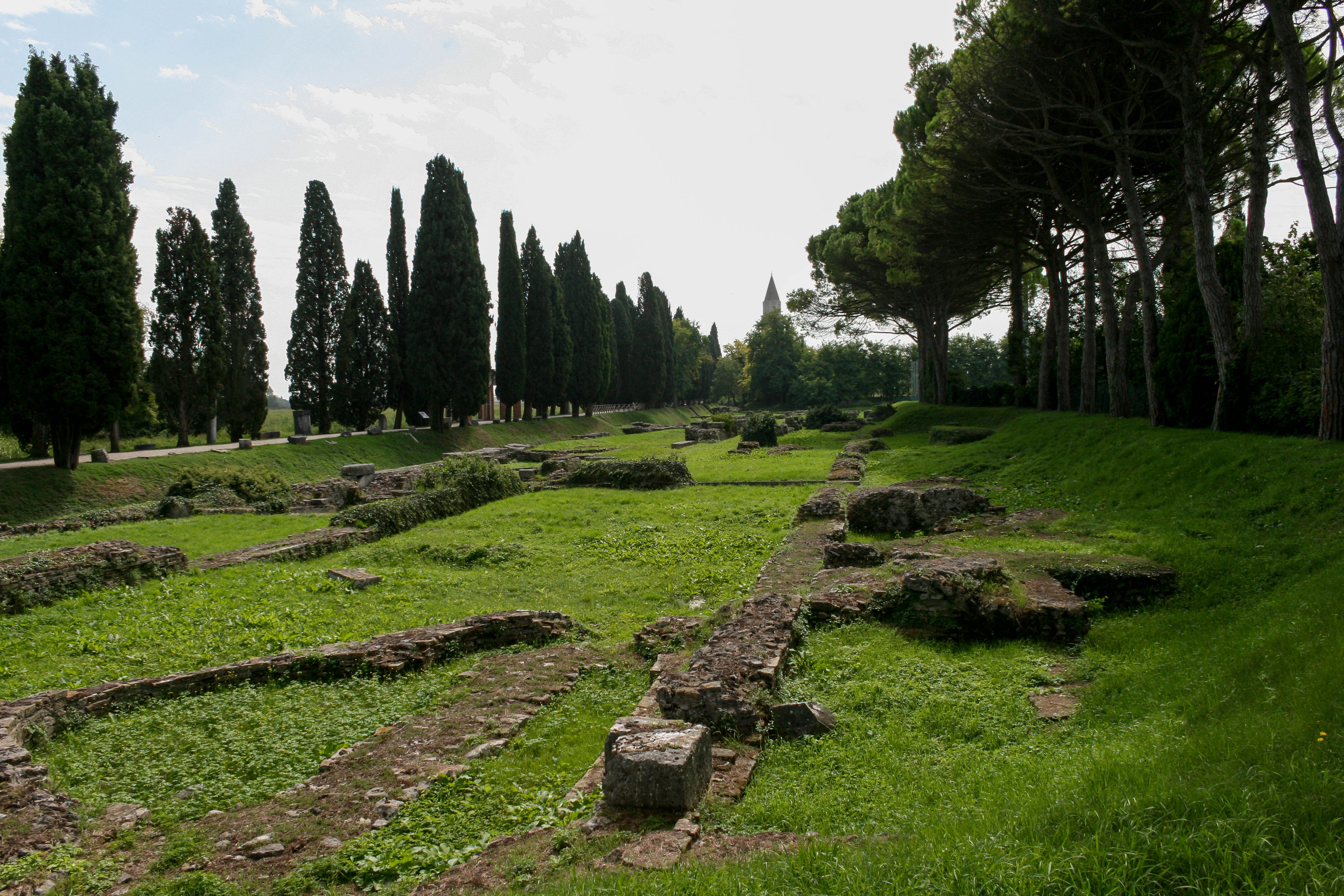
The ancient inland port of Aquileia

In the war against the Marcomanni in 167, the town was hard pressed; its fortifications had fallen into disrepair during the long peace. Nevertheless, when in 168 Marcus Aurelius made Aquileia the principal fortress of the empire against the barbarians of the North and East, it rose to the pinnacle of its greatness and soon had a population of 100,000. Septimius Severus visited in 193. In 238, when the town took the side of the Senate against the emperor Maximinus Thrax, the fortifications were hastily restored, and proved of sufficient strength to resist for several months, until Maximinus himself was assassinated.

=== Late Antiquity ===
An imperial palace was constructed in Aquileia, in which the emperors after the time of Diocletian frequently resided.

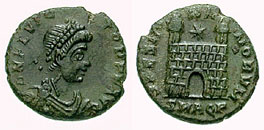
Roman Emperor Flavius Victor on this as struck in Aquileia mint

During the fourth century, Aquileia maintained its importance. Constantine sojourned there on numerous occasions. It became a naval station and the seat of the Corrector Venetiarum et Histriae. A mint was established, of which the coins were very numerous. The bishop of the Diocese of Aquileia obtained the rank of metropolitan archbishop. A council held in the city in 381 was only the first of a series of Councils of Aquileia that have been convened over the centuries. However, the city played a part in the struggles between the rulers of the fourth century. In 340, the emperor Constantine II was killed nearby while invading the territory of his younger brother Constans.

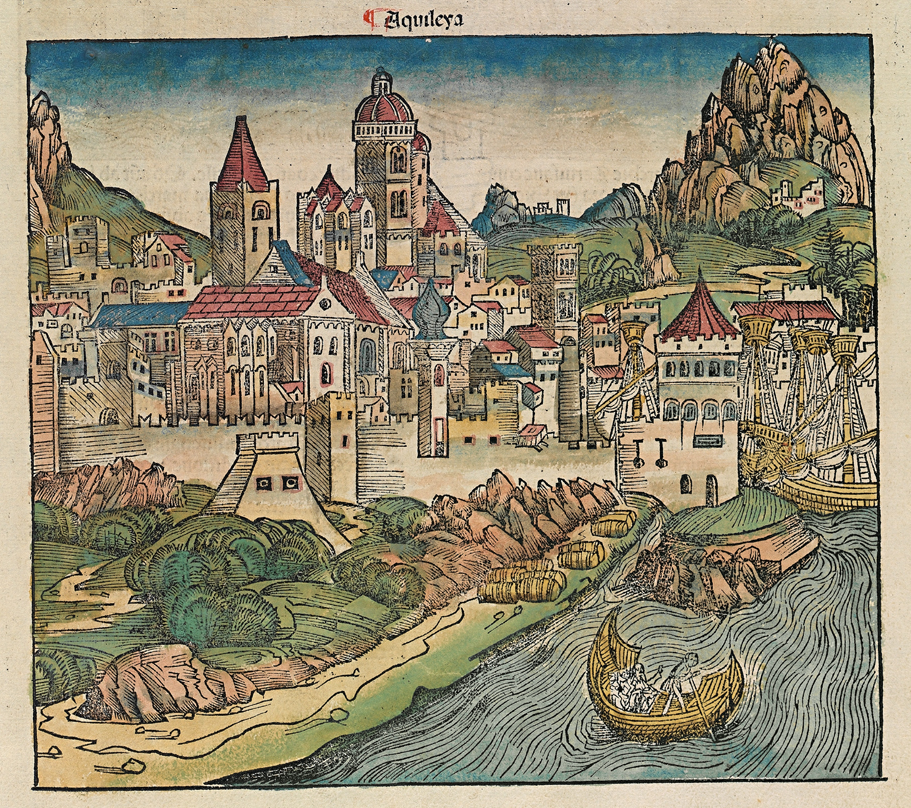
Aquileia in a 1493 woodcut from Hartmann Schedel's Nuremberg Chronicle

At the end of the fourth century, Ausonius enumerated Aquileia as the ninth among the great cities of the world, placing Rome, Constantinople, Carthage, Antioch, Alexandria, Trier, Mediolanum, and Capua before it. However, such prominence made it a target and Alaric and the Visigoths besieged it in 401, during which time some of its residents fled to the nearby lagoons. Alaric again attacked it in 408. Attila attacked the city in 452. During this invasion, on July 18, Attila and his Huns so utterly destroyed the city that it was afterwards hard to recognize its original site. The fall of Aquileia was the first of Attila's incursions into Roman territory; followed by cities like Mediolanum and Ticinum. The Roman inhabitants, together with those of smaller towns in the neighbourhood, fled en masse to the lagoons, where they laid the foundations of the cities of Venice and nearby Grado.

Yet Aquileia would rise again, though much diminished, and continue to exist until the Lombards invaded in 568; the Lombards destroyed it a second time in 590. Meanwhile, the patriarch fled to the island town of Grado, which was under the protection of the Byzantines. When the patriarch residing in Grado reconciled with Rome in 606, those continuing in the Schism of the Three Chapters, rejecting the Second Council of Constantinople, elected a patriarch at Aquileia. Thus, the diocese was essentially divided into two parts, with the mainland patriarchate of Aquileia under the protection of the Lombards, and the insular patriarchate of Aquileia seated in Grado being protected by the exarchate of Ravenna and later the Doges of Venice, with the collusion of the Lombards. The line of the patriarchs elected in Aquileia would continue in schism until 699. However, although they kept the title of patriarch of Aquileia, they moved their residence first to Cormons and later to Cividale.

=== Middle Ages ===
The Lombard dukes of Friuli ruled Aquileia and the surrounding mainland territory from Cividale. In 774, Charlemagne conquered the Lombard duchy and made it into a Frankish one with Eric of Friuli as duke. In 787, Charlemagne named the priest and master of grammar at the Palace School of Paulinus II, the new patriarch of Aquileia. The patriarchate, despite being divided with a northern portion assigned to the pastoral care of the newly created Archbishopric of Salzburg, would remain one of the largest dioceses. Although Paulinus resided mainly at Cividale, his successor Maxentius considered rebuilding Aquileia. However, the project never came to fruition.

While Maxentius was patriarch, the pope approved the Synod of Mantua, which affirmed the precedence of the mainland patriarch of Aquileia over the patriarch of Grado. However, material conditions were soon to worsen for Aquileia. The ruins of Aquileia were continually pillaged for building material. And with the collapse of the Carolingians in the tenth century, the inhabitants would suffer under the raids of the Magyars.

By the eleventh century, the patriarch of Aquileia had grown strong enough to assert temporal sovereignty over Friuli and Aquileia. The Holy Roman Emperor gave the region to the patriarch as a feudal possession. However, the patriarch's temporal authority was constantly disputed and assailed by the territorial nobility.

In 1027 and 1044, Patriarch Poppo of Aquileia, who rebuilt the cathedral of Aquileia, entered and sacked neighbouring Grado, and, though the Pope reconfirmed the Patriarch of the latter in his dignities, the town never fully recovered, though it continued to be the seat of the Patriarchate until its formal transference to Venice in 1450.

In the fourteenth century, the Patriarchal State reached its largest extension, stretching from the Piave river to the Julian Alps and northern Istria. The seat of the Patriarchate of Aquileia had been transferred to Udine in 1238, but returned to Aquileia in 1420 when Venice annexed the territory of Udine.

In 1445, the defeated patriarch Ludovico Trevisan acquiesced in the loss of his ancient temporal estate in return for an annual salary of 5,000 ducats allowed him from the Venetian treasury. Henceforth only Venetians were allowed to hold the title of Patriarch of Aquileia. The Patriarchal State was incorporated into the Republic of Venice with the name of Patria del Friuli, ruled by a provveditore generale or a luogotenente living in Udine.

=== Modern era ===
In the 16th century Aquileia fell under the Habsburg County of Gorizia (later the Princely County of Gorizia and Gradisca), a part of the Holy Roman Empire.

The patriarchal diocese was finally officially suppressed in 1751, and the sees of Udine and Gorizia were established from its territory.

During the Napoleonic Wars Aquileia was annexed to the Napoleonic Kingdom of Italy by the 1807 Treaty of Fontainebleau. It returned to Austrian control in 1815 following the Congress of Vienna, initially as part of the Kingdom of Illyria, then the reconstituted Gorizia and Gradisca (part of the Austrian Littoral).

Following the Austro-Hungarian defeat in World War I, Aquileia passed to the Kingdom of Italy in 1920 (Treaty of Rapallo).

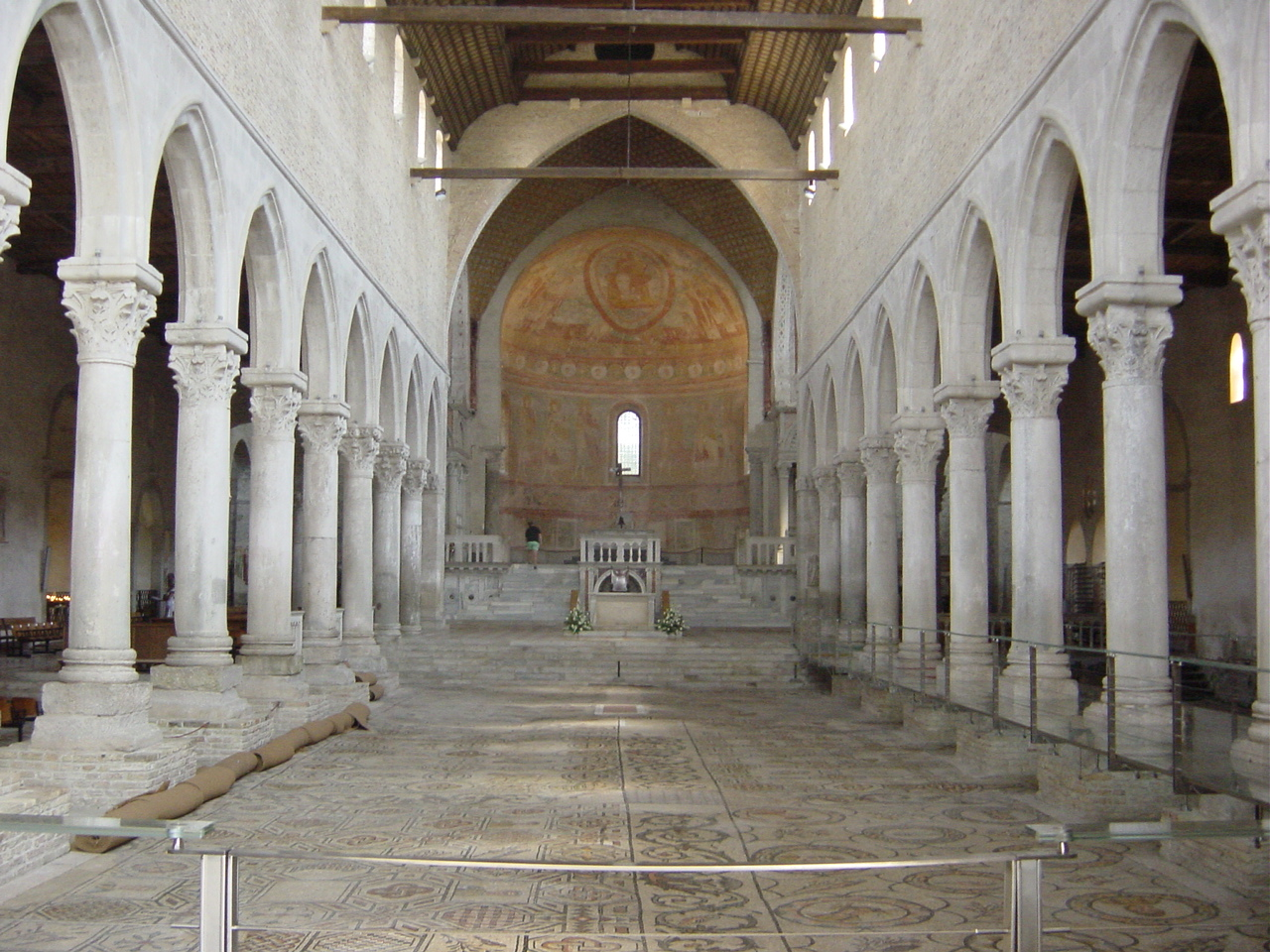
Interior of the cathedral, with the mosaic pavement.

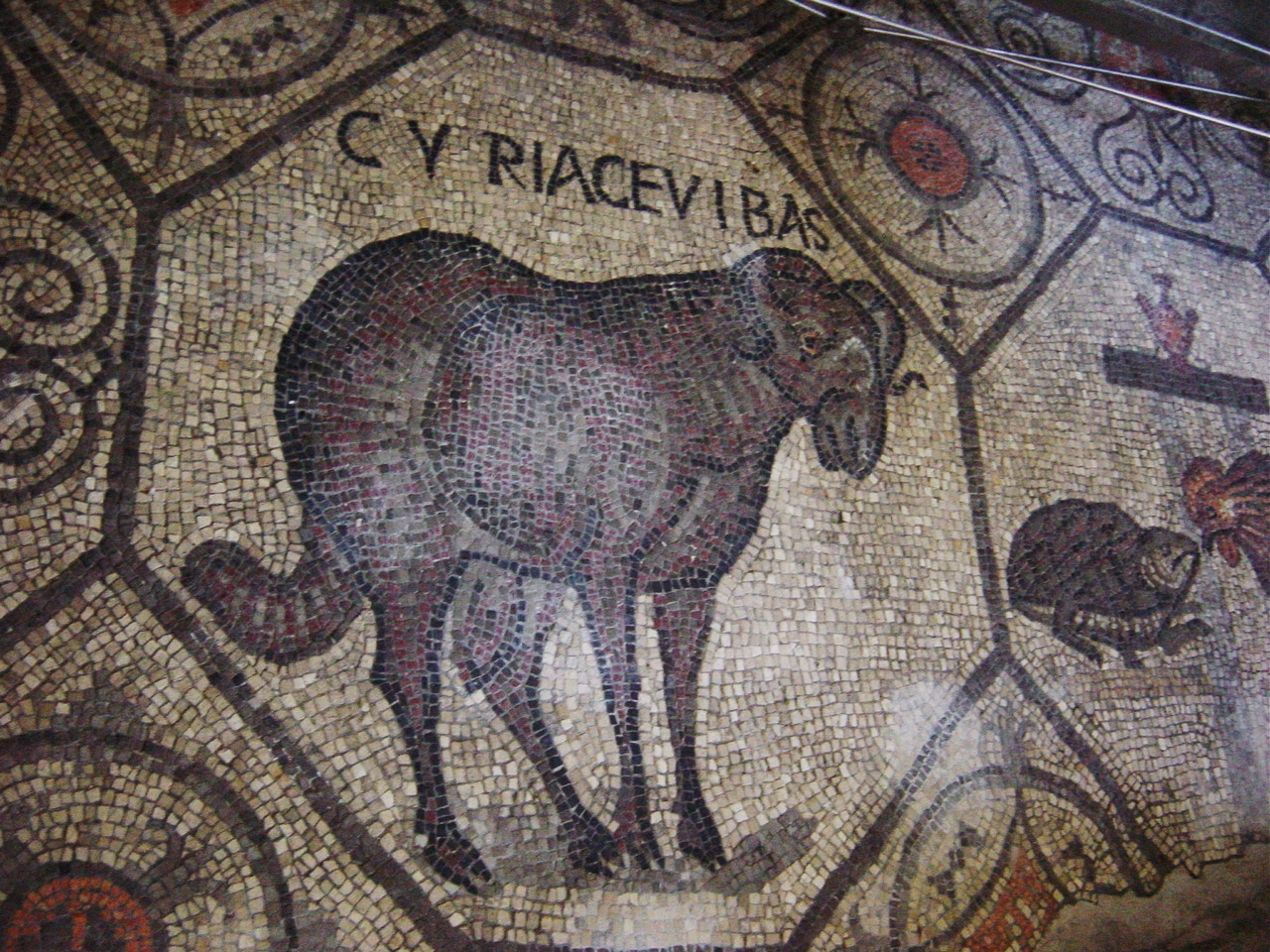
Ancient mosaic in the cathedral.

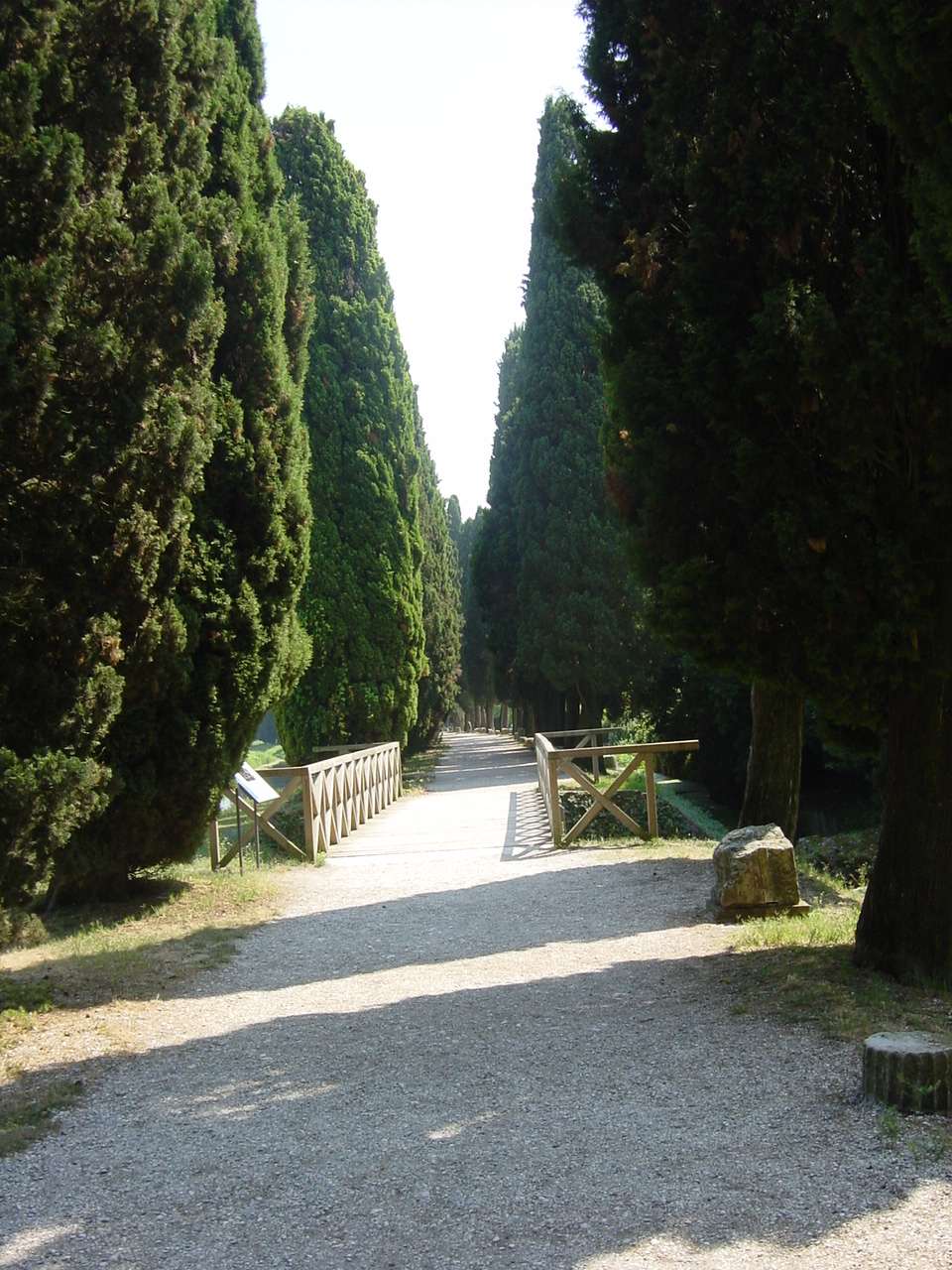
The archaeological walk.

== Main sights ==
=== Cathedral ===
Aquileia Cathedral is a flat-roofed basilica that was erected by Patriarch Poppo in 1031 on the site of an earlier church and rebuilt in the Gothic style by Patriarch Marquard of Randeck (1365–1381).

=== Ancient Roman Remains ===
Aquileia is a smaller town today than the colony first founded by Rome. Over the centuries, sieges, earthquakes, floods and pillaging of the ancient buildings for materials mean that no building from the Roman period remain above ground. The site of Aquileia is believed to be the largest Roman city yet to be excavated and is on the UNESCO World Heritage List. Excavations, however, have revealed some of the layout of the Roman town like a segment of a street, the north-western angle of the town walls; the river port; and the former locations of baths, an amphitheatre, a circus, a cemetery, the Via Sacra, the forum and a market. The National Archaeological Museum of Aquileia contains over 2,000 inscriptions, statues and other antiquities and mosaics, as well as glasses of local production and a collection.

=== Others ===
In the Monastero fraction is a fifth-century Christian basilica, later a Benedictine monastery, which now houses the Palaeo-Christian Museum. Another Byzantine-style basilica, expanded in the 6th century under Justinian, was discovered at the site in 2024.

== Notable people ==
- Pope Pius I is believed to have been born at Aquileia during the late first century.
- Saint Chrysogonus was martyred here in the beginning of the fourth century.
- Licia Kokocinski - Australian politician

== Twin towns – sister cities ==
Aquileia is twinned with the following settlements:

- Piran, Slovenia
- Maria Saal, Austria

== See also ==
- Schism of the Three Chapters
- Aquileian rite
- Councils of Aquileia
- List of Aquileia Bishops and patriarchs
- Acaste Bresciani

== General references ==
- Catholic Encyclopedia
- Neher in Kirchenlexikon I, 1184–89
- De Rubeis, Monumenta Eccles. Aquil. (Strasburg, 1740)
- Ferdinando Ughelli, Italia Sacra, I sqq.; X, 207
- Cappelletti, Chiese d'Italia, VIII, 1 sqq.
- Menzano, Annali del Friuli (1858–68)
- Paschini, Sulle Origini della Chiesa di Aquileia (1904)
- Glaschroeder, in Buchberger's Kirchl. Handl. (Munich, 1904), I, 300-301
- Hefele, Conciliengesch. II, 914–23.
- For the episcopal succession, see P. B. Gams, Series episcoporum (Ratisbon, 1873–86), and Eubel, Hierarchia Catholica Medii Aevi (Muenster, 1898).
- Glaser, Franz; Pochmarski, Erwin (2012). Aquileia. Der archäologische Führer (in German). Darmstadt/Mainz: Philipp von Zabern. ISBN 978-3-8053-4277-3.
