= Basilica di Santa Maria Assunta, Aquileia =

Roman Catholic church in Italy

Basilica di Santa Maria Assunta
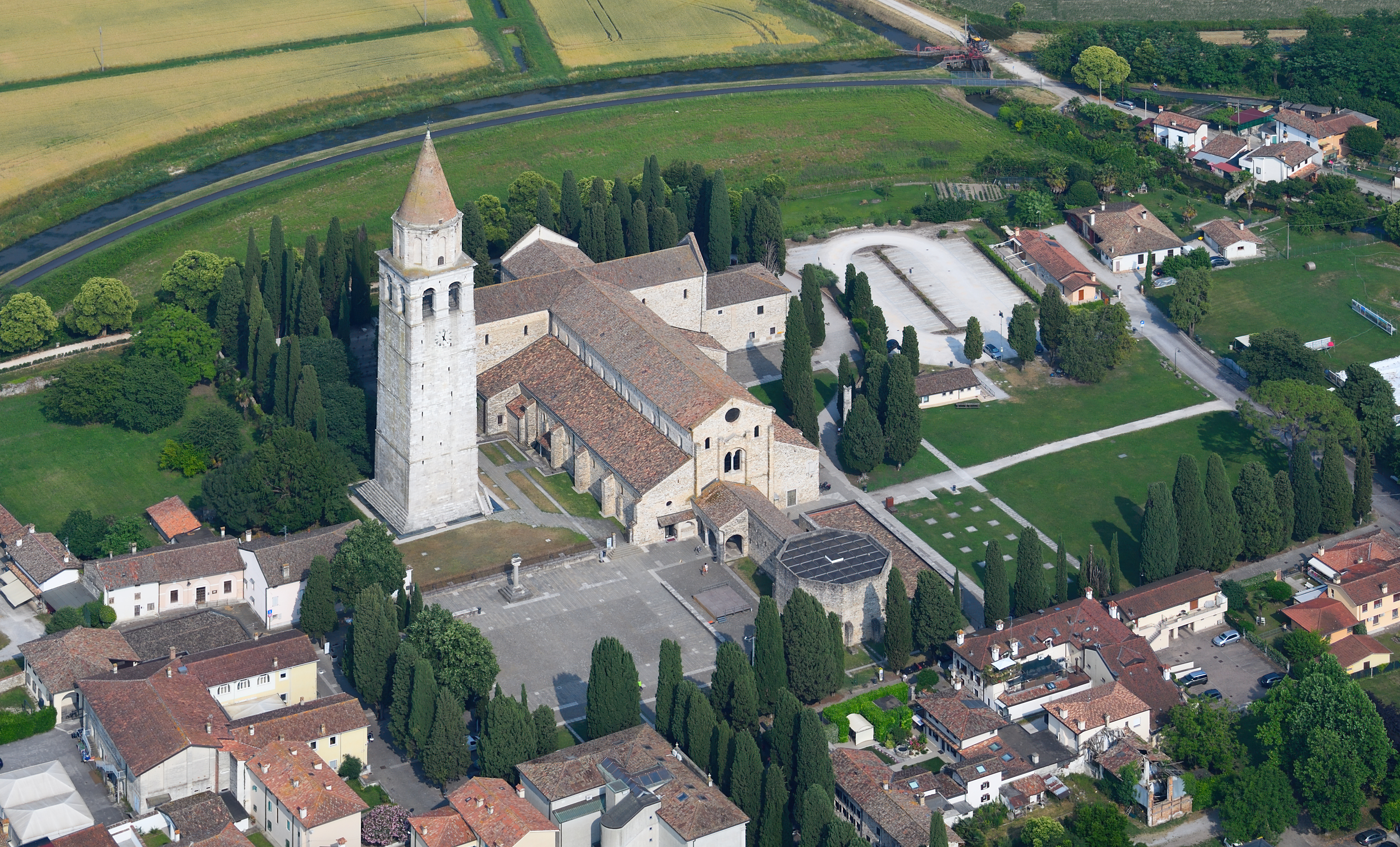
- Aerial view of the basilica and the campanile

Religion
- Affiliation: Roman Catholic
- Province: Udine
- Ecclesiastical or organisational status: Patriarchal minor basilica
- Year consecrated: 1031

Location
- Location: Aquileia, Italy
- Interactive map of Basilica di Santa Maria Assunta
- Coordinates: 45.769722°N 13.370833°E

Architecture
- Type: Basilica
- Style: Romanesque
- UNESCO World Heritage Site
- Official name: Archaeological Area and the Patriarchal Basilica of Aquileia
- Type: Cultural
- Criteria: iii, iv
- Designated: 1998 (22nd session)
- Reference no.: 825
- State Party: Italy
- Region: Europe and North America

Basilica di Santa Maria Assunta (Italian: Basilica Patriarcale di Santa Maria Assunta) is the principal church in the town of Aquileia, in the Province of Udine and the region of Friuli-Venezia Giulia, Italy.

The original church dates back to the fourth century. The current basilica was built in the eleventh century and partially rebuilt again in the thirteenth century. It is located on Via Sacra, overlooking the Piazza del Capitolo, along with the campanile and baptistery.

== Architecture ==
The façade, in Romanesque-Gothic style, is connected by a portico to the so-called Church of the Pagans, and the remains of the 5th-century baptistery. The interior has a nave and two aisles, with a noteworthy mosaic pavement from the 4th century. The wooden ceiling is from 1526, while the fresco decoration belongs to various ages: from the 4th century in the St. Peter's chapel of the apse area; from the 11th century in the apse itself; from the 12th century in the so-called "Crypt of the Frescoes", under the presbytery, with a cycle depicting the origins of Christianity in Aquileia and the history of St. Hermagoras, first bishop of the city.

Next to the 11th-century Romanesque chapel of the Holy Sepulchre, at the beginning of the left aisle, flooring of different ages can be seen: the lowest is from a Roman villa of the age of Augustus; the middle one has a typical cocciopesto pavement; the upper one, bearing blackening from Attila's fire, has geometrical decorations.

Externally, behind the 9th-century campanile and the apse, is the Cemetery of the Fallen, where ten unnamed soldiers of World War I are buried. Maria Bergamas is also buried there. She lost her son in World War I and she made the selection of the body of the Unknown Soldier of Italy. Saint Hermagoras is also buried there.

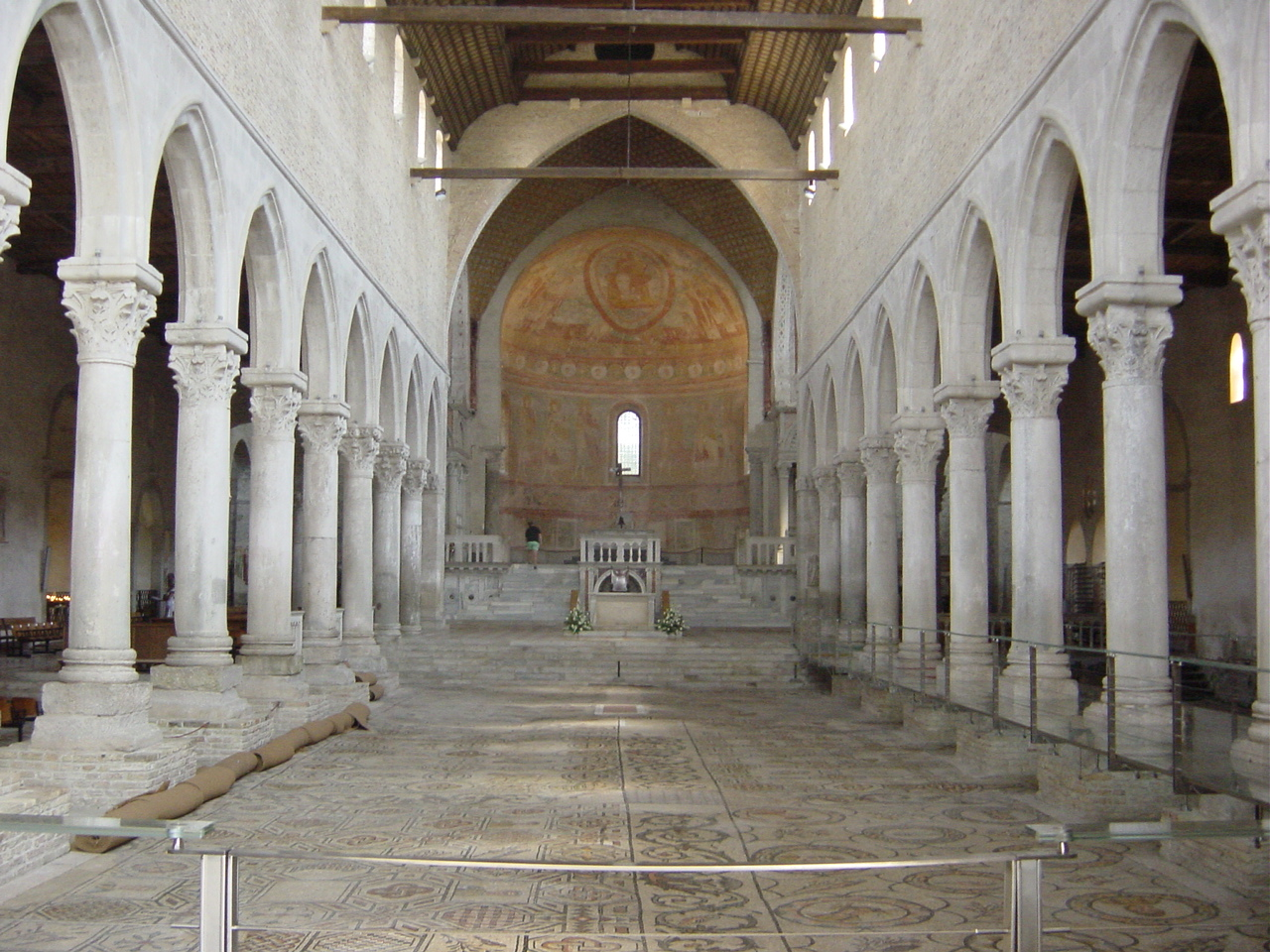
The nave with mosaic dating from the 4th century.

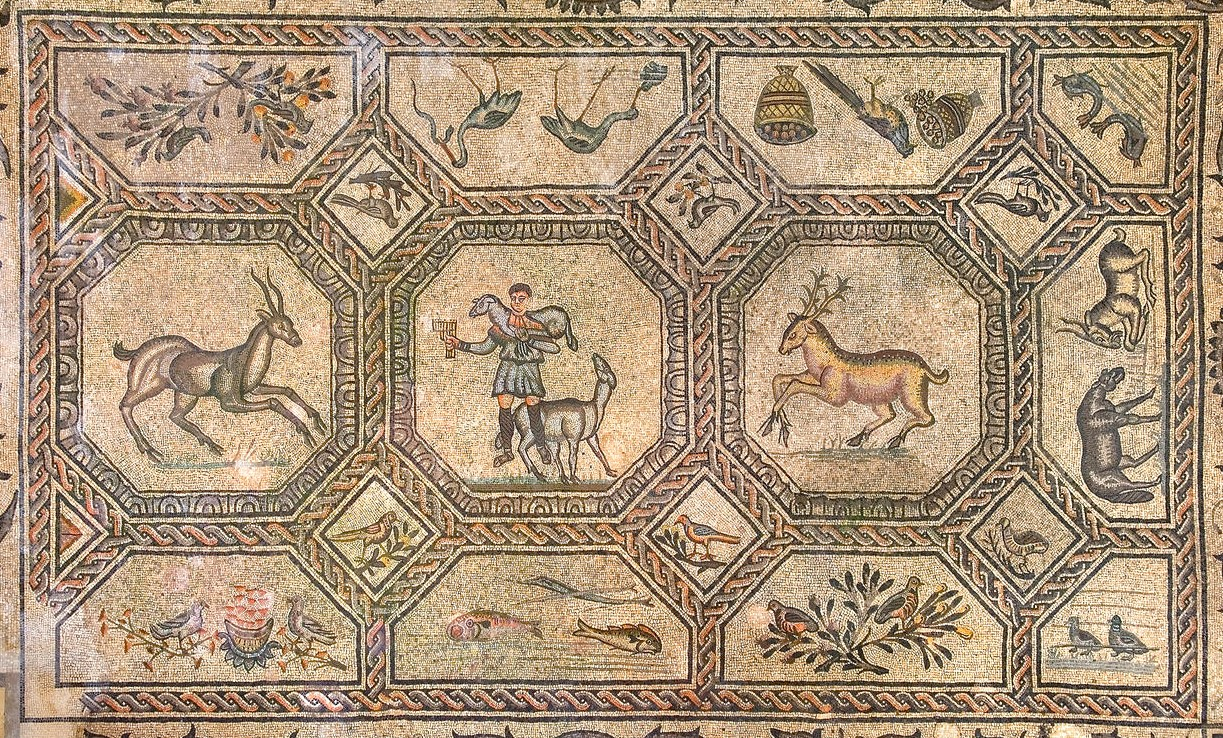
Floor mosaic featuring the Good Shepherd at the Basilica di Santa Maria Assunta, Aquileia, St. Peter's chapel.

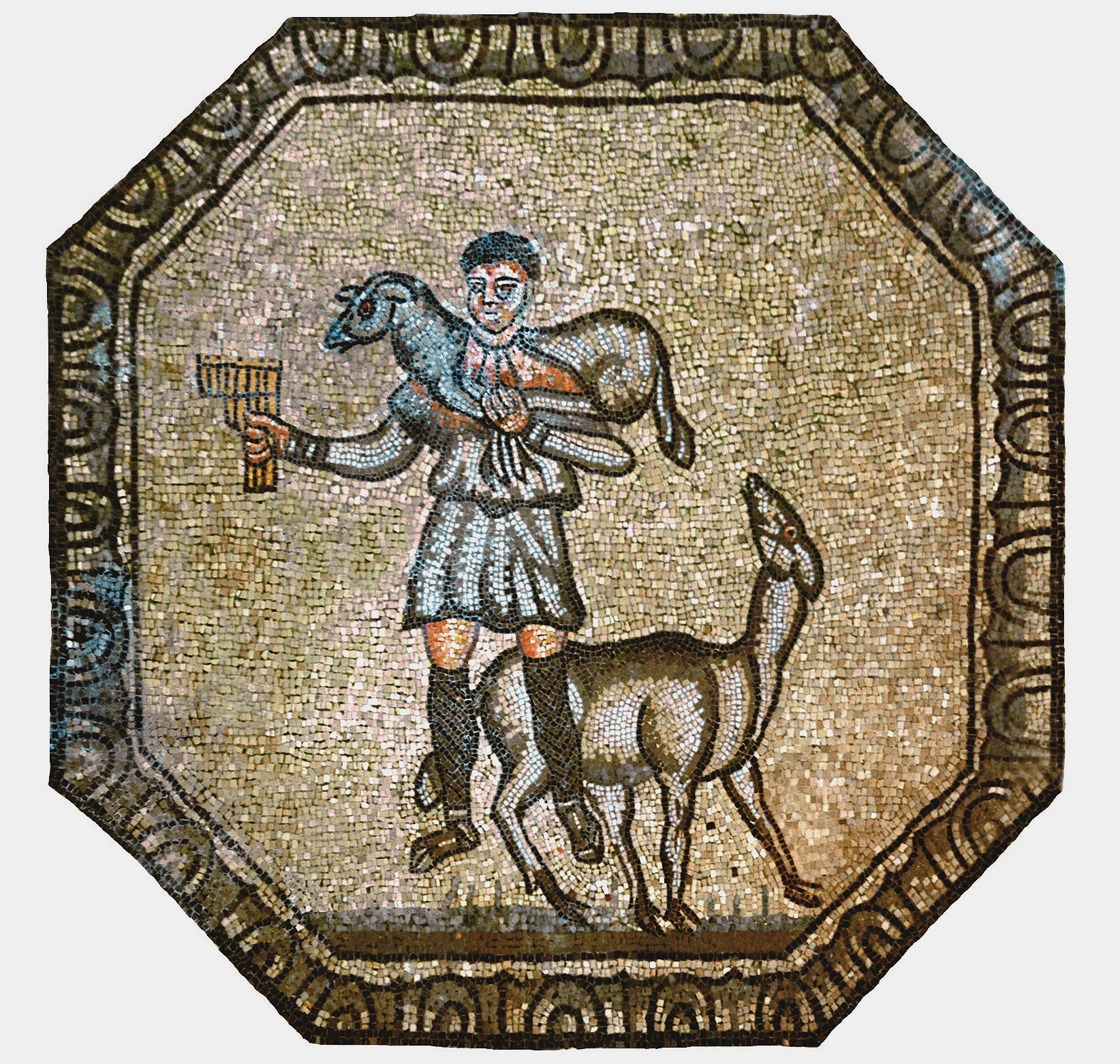
Christ as the Good Shepherd.

== Bibliography ==
- Cuscito, Giuseppe; Lehmann, Giuseppe (eds) (2010). La Basilica di Aquileia. Storia, archeologia ed arte. Atti della XL Settimana di Studi Aquileiesi 7–9 maggio 2009 [The Basilica of Aquileia. History, Archaeology and Art. Proceedings of the XL conference of Aquileian Studies 7–9 May 2009]. Antichità altoadriatiche, vol. 69. Trieste: Editreg, ISBN 978-88-97557-74-6 (in Italian).
- Lanckoroński, Karl (ed.) (1906). Der Dom von Aquileia, sein Bau und seine Geschichte [The cathedral of Aquileia, its construction and its history]. Vienna: Gerlach & Wiedling.
- Ulmer, Christoph (2022). Der Dom von Aquileia. La basilica di Aquileia [The basilica of Aquileia]. Stuttgart: Eugen Ulmer, ISBN 978-3-8186-1564-2.
