= Jacob Meir Biderman =

Rabbi Jacob Meir Biderman (1870–1941) was the president of Kolel Polen (קופת רבי מאיר בעל הנס - כולל פולין), in 1935 was appointed to the board of Rabbis of the Warsaw community, along with Rabbi Menachem Ziemba and Rabbi Avraham Weinberg.

== Biography ==
Born in the town of Lubicz (Lubitsch) 6 Sep 1869, to his father Rabbi Nathan Solomon Betzalel Biderman, Rabbi of the town. His grandfather was Rabbi Yaakov Dovid, rabbi of Kozhnitz and Wyszogrod.

Was son-in-law of Rabbi Yehuda Arye Leib Alter of Ger “Sfas Emes”, and in-law of Rabbi Avraham Mordechai Alter, the "Imrei Emes" and his son Rabbi Yisrael Alter, the "Beis of Israel" the Rebbe of Ger. and the grandfather of Rabbi Pinchas Menachem Alter.

He published Sfas Emes, the writings of his father-in-law on the Talmud, together with his own additional scholarly notes.

He was a president of Kolel Polen, the aid society for Palestinian Jews whose families came from Poland. in 1935 was appointed to the board of Rabbis of the Warsaw community, along with Rabbi Menachem Zemba and Rabbi Avraham Weinberg.

In 1935 year was part of a rabbinical delegation to Israel, which included Rabbi Samuel David Unger, Rabbi Zalman Sorotzkin and Rabbi Yosef Shlomo Kahaneman.

In his late years he suffered from diabetes, but even then he continued his studies and his teaching. In 1940, with the establishment of the Warsaw Ghetto, his health worsened due to lack of drugs and under suitable conditions, and on 08,06,1941 died and was buried next to the Warsaw hospital.

== His family ==
He married Ester Alter (d. 1 Oct 1943) in 1884

Their daughter Feige Mintche Biderman (b. 28 Jan 1890) married (1922) her uncle Rabbi Avrohom Mordechai (b. 25 12.1866 Gora Kalwaria “Gur” Poland, d. 3 Jun 1948 Jerusalem) She was his second wife.

Son Rabbi Yitzchak David Biderman

Daughter Biderman m. her cousin Rabbi Pinchas Yaacov HaCohen Levin

The only son of Rabbi Abraham Mordechai and Feige Mintche was Rabbi Pinchas Menachem Alter (b. 9 Jun 1926 Falenica, Poland, d. 7 Mar 1996 Jerusalem)

=== Children of The Pnei Menachem ===
- Rabbi Yaakov Meir Alter
- Harav Shaul Alter of Sfas Emes Yeshiva
- Rabbi Yitzhak David Alter
- Rabbi Daniel Chaim Alter
- Rabbi Yehuda Arye Alter m. daughter of Menashe Klein
- Daughter Ester m. Rabbi Dov Berl Lipel.

== See also ==
הגאון רבי יעקב מאיר בידרמן זצ"ל בית יעקב 69, שבט תשכ"ה, עמ' 7-6
