= Shaul Alter =

Israeli rabbi

Rabbi Shaul Alter
- שאול אלתר
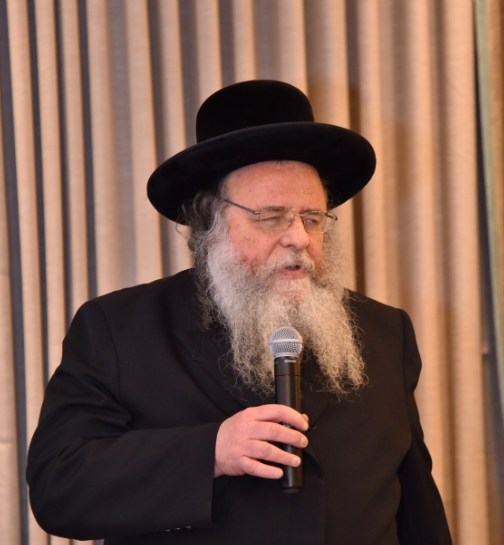
- Born: July 6, 1957 (age 68); Jerusalem
- Occupation: Rosh Yeshivah
- Known for: In-depth and broad knowledge of Torah
- Father: Pinchas Menachem Alter

Shaul Alter (Hebrew: שאול אלתר; born July 6, 1957) is the founder and current leader of Kehilas Pnei Menachem (an offshoot from the Ger Hasidic dynasty). He served as Rosh Yeshivah of Sfas Emes Yeshivah from 1993 until its closing in 2016.

== Early life ==
Born in Jerusalem to Tziporah, a daughter of Rabbi Avraham Mordechai Alter (son of Rabbi Moshe Betzalel Alter brother of Rebbe Avraham Mordechai Alter of Ger) and to Rabbi Pinchas Menachem Alter (Rosh Yeshivah of Sfas Emes Yeshivah and later to date Rebbe of the Ger Hasidic Dynasty.) He is named after the grandfather of his mother Rabbi Shaul Moshe Zilberman. He studied in Imrei Emes Yeshivah in Bnei Brak, and afterward continued to learn under his father's guidance in Sfas Emes Yeshivah where he was known as an outstanding student who finished the entire Talmud.

In 1977 Alter married Naomi, daughter of Chaim Dov Rubinstein from the city of Haifa. After his marriage, he lived in Haifa, where he was appointed as Maggid Shiur of Ohr Simcha Yeshivah in Haifa. He was also given the opportunity to give in-depth shiurim in the Beis Yisroel Yeshivah of Ashdod.

After the death of his uncle, Rebbe Simcha Bunim Alter of Ger, in 1992, his father, who was then appointed as Rebbe of the Ger Dynasty, requested he should move back to his birthplace, Jerusalem.

In July 1993 he was given the position of Rosh Yeshivah of Sfas Emes Yeshivah, per his father's request. He gave in-depth shiurim daily and weekly in the Yeshivah.

When the change in the way of learning in the Yeshivas of Ger was switched from in-depth (Iyun) to broad knowledge (Bekius), the shiurim were halted. In 2016 the Yeshiva was closed through orders from the Gerer Rebbe.

Alter's disciples published a series of books based on his in-depth Shiurim, known as Yalkut Shiurim (in Hebrew ילקוט שיעורים).

== Split from the Ger dynasty ==
After the passing of his father Rabbi Pinchas Menachem Alter (the "Pnei Menachem"), in March 1996, his father's nephew, Rabbi Yaakov Aryeh Alter, was crowned as Rebbe of the dynasty.

Following an "ostracism" signed by the leaders of the dynasty in Israel in June 2019 against Mr. Dovid Berliner the former Administrator of Camp Ger in the United States(in a case known as the Camp Ger dispute), in which the majority (including some of the leaders) of the community in the United States didn't partake and even disobeyed it, he wrote a letter of criticism against the establishment in support of Berliner, beginning his formal separation from the established leadership of the Ger Hassidim led by the Gerrer Rebbe.

In the middle of the Holiday of Sukkos (October 2019), following a failed attempt at reconciliation between him and the Rebbe, his followers announced the existence of a separate congregation of prayers on Simchas Torah. In response, the Ger leadership announced that they would ban students from their institutions whose fathers had attended the separate prayers.

During the holiday, hundreds of followers participated in separate prayers and gatherings. Students whose fathers participated in the separate prayers were removed from the Hasidic establishment's institutions. Immediately afterward, Alter's men announced a split and the establishment of a separate community and institutions, including Yeshivas Pnei Menachem.

Until November 2021, the community in the United States, the source of the conflict, was spared from being removed from the institutions; and initially, the two factions of the dynasty remained united as one community, studying in the same yeshivas and praying in the same synagogues.

In 2021, Alter made a crowdfunding campaign to build his institutions and raised over $16 Million in 48 hours.

In November 2021, Alter visited America, where he was greeted at the airport by an ecstatic crowd of his followers. A welcoming reception on the night of his arrival in Borough Park was attended by well over 1,000 people. Over 10,000 people joined him for Sabbath services. Throughout his visit he met with leaders of other Hasidic groups and delivered numerous shiurim across the NY/NJ metro area which were attended by thousands of participants.

Jewish titles
Preceded by Pinchas Menachem Alter	Gerrer Rosh Yeshiva; 1992–2016	Closed
New title	Leader of Kehilas Pnei Menachem; 2019–present	Incumbent
