= Sfas Emes Yeshiva =

Coordinates: 31.7862°N 35.2130°E

- ישיבת שפת אמת
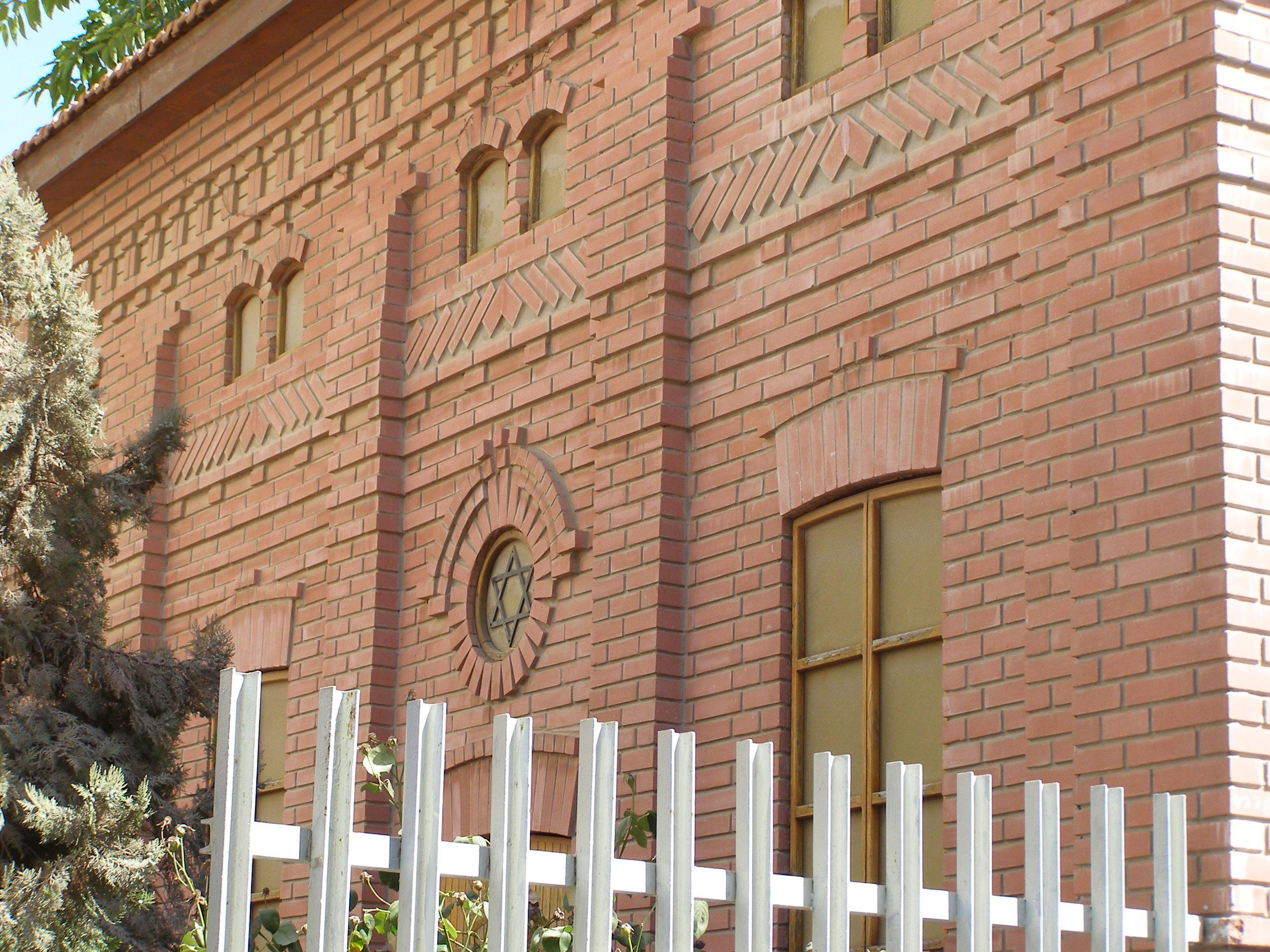

Location
- 5 Sfas Emes Street; Mahane Yehuda; Jerusalem

Information
- Established: 1925 - 2016
- Rosh Yeshiva: Rabbi Shaul Alter
- Affiliation: Orthodox

Sfas Emes Yeshiva (Hebrew: ישיבת שפת אמת) was an Orthodox Jewish yeshiva in Jerusalem, serving the Gerrer Hasidic community until 2016. Founded in 1925 in the Mahane Yehuda neighborhood of Jerusalem, it was one of the few Hasidic yeshivas in Israel in the early twentieth century.

== History ==
The yeshiva was founded by the Hasidim of Grand Rabbi Avraham Mordechai Alter (Imrei Emes), the fourth Gerrer Rebbe, and was named after the Rebbe's father, Rabbi Yehuda Aryeh Leib Alter, (Sfas Emes). With the Rebbe's approval, the head staff included Rabbi Menachem Mendel Kasher, Rabbi Yaakov Henich Sankevitz, and Rabbi Nechemiah Alter (the Rebbe's brother).

The yeshiva opened with 25 students, who were soon joined by other students from Poland. All the Admorim in Israel sent their sons to it, as well. The yeshiva grew year by year.

In 1926, the Rebbe circulated a letter to his Hasidim on the day of his father's yahrzeit, expressing his support of the yeshiva:

In the holy city of Jerusalem, a junior yeshiva has now been founded, in memory of my saintly father. It fills a need for the young students who live there, since the existing yeshivos cannot cater to all the applicants. Besides, the program of study followed by them is not in harmony with the spirit of learning prevalent in Poland.

The Rebbe visited the yeshiva for the first time on his third visit to Israel in 1927.

Over the years, the Yeshiva continued to expand and at its peak the yeshiva's student body numbered hundreds of students from Israel and abroad, under the direction of Rosh Yeshiva Rabbi Shaul Alter, the second son of Rabbi Pinchas Menachem Alter, the seventh Gerrer Rebbe.

The yeshiva was closed in 2016 following years of acrimony between the current Gerrer Rebbe Yaakov Aryeh Alter and his first cousin Shaul over leadership of the Ger dynasty. Yaakov Aryeh made a change in the Gerrer education system to exclusively study the Talmud in a concise fashion, and not the in-depth style which had been customary until then. This harmed the stature and prominence of Shaul, the then-dean of the prestigious, flagship Gerrer institution, and eventually led to its closing.

== Home for the Rebbe ==
In 1940, after his escape from Nazi Europe, Rabbi Avraham Mordechai established his residence in the Sfas Emes Yeshiva. He prayed with the yeshiva students, but did not conduct a public tish there. Within a short time of his arrival, hundreds of his Hasidim who had come to Israel before the war came to live in the neighborhood surrounding the yeshiva.

Following the United Nations declaration of the establishment of the State of Israel on November 29, 1947, the Arab Legion lay siege to the city of Jerusalem, blocking the mountain road connecting Tel Aviv and Jerusalem, and began shelling the capital city. The Rebbe, who had been ailing for several years and was unable to walk unaided, was moved for his safety from his residence in the upper stories of the yeshiva to living quarters in the basement. Some of the rooms of the yeshiva were also turned into a shelter for the students.

The Rebbe's condition worsened during the siege, and he was moved back to his upstairs room. A few days after a cease-fire went into effect, on the first day of Shavuot, 3 June 1948, he died. At first, some of his followers thought that they could bring him to burial on the Mount of Olives, with the help of the Red Cross. Others believed that the Rebbe should be buried on the grounds of the Yeshiva, and his body transferred to a grave on the Mount of Olives after the war was over. The Rebbe's son and successor, Rabbi Yisrael Alter, gave the go-ahead to bury him in the yeshiva courtyard, where he lies until today.

== The ohel ==
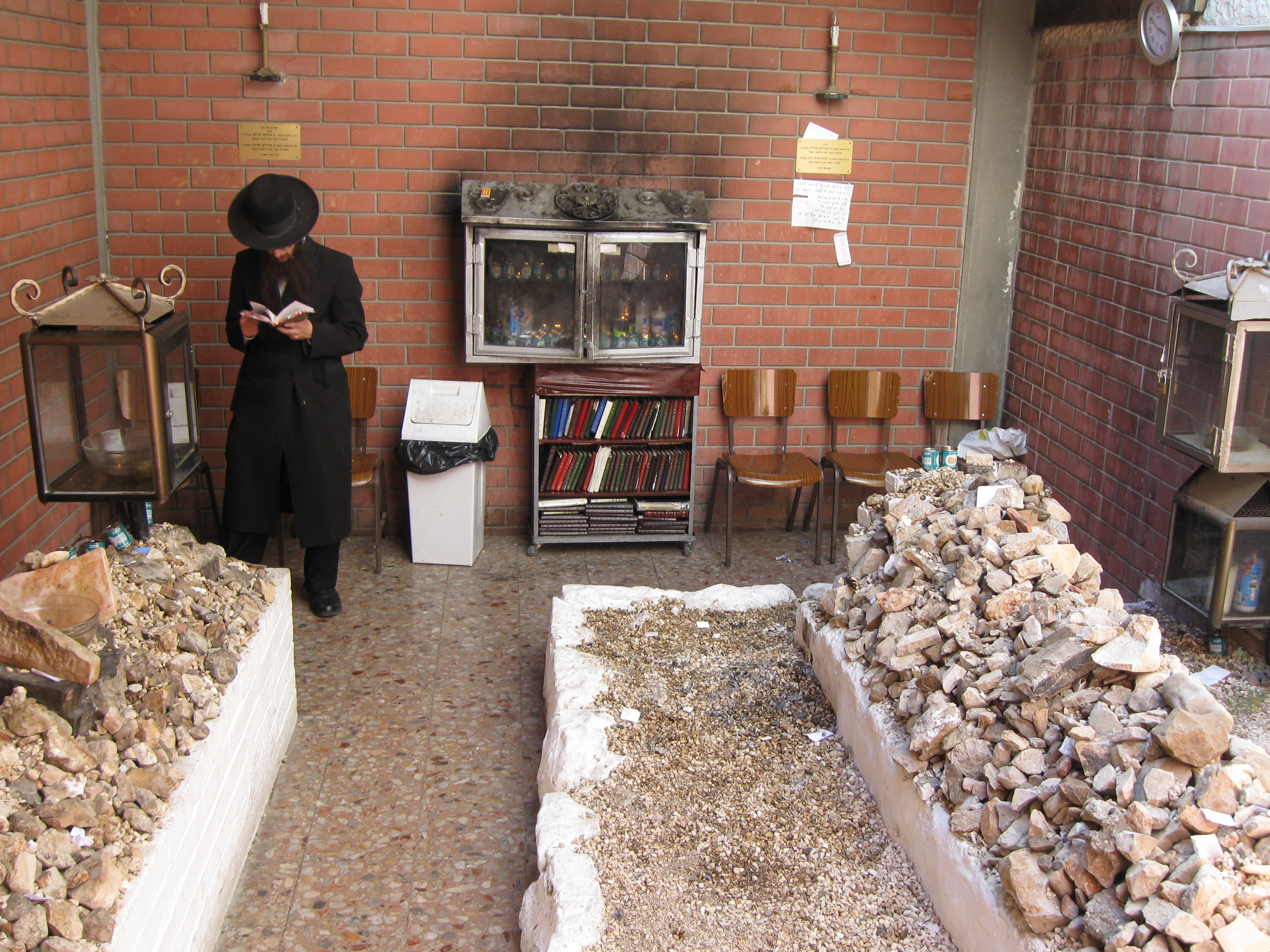
The graves of Grand Rabbi Avraham Mordechai Alter (right) and his son, Grand Rabbi Pinchas Menachem Alter (left), in an ohel adjacent to the Sfas Emes Yeshiva.

The Imrei Emes was succeeded as Rebbe by his sons, Rabbi Yisrael Alter (Beis Yisrael), Rabbi Simcha Bunim Alter (Lev Simcha), and Rabbi Pinchas Menachem Alter (Pnei Menachem), in that order. In 1996, after less than four years as Rebbe, the Pnei Menachem died suddenly. A decision was made to bury him beside his father, the Imrei Emes, in the yeshiva courtyard. The decision sparked opposition from the municipality, which claimed that the presence of a grave in the heart of the now-developed city would be a potential source of contamination for the residents, but the funeral went ahead. After the Pnei Menachem was laid to rest beside his father, a red-brick ohel in the shape of a house was built over the two graves. Both graves are visited frequently by students in the yeshiva before and after their learning sessions.

The ohel includes both a section for men (in the same room as the graves) and a section for women behind a rear door. The ohel is equipped with sinks for the use of visitors after they visit the graves. A small garden lies to the side of the ohel, and the wall of the building in the adjoining lot was redesigned to resemble the façade of the original Ger yeshiva in Poland.

The addition of a partially open roof to the ohel after the burial of the Pnei Menachem solves the problem of tumas meis (impurity from the dead) for students who are kohanim, and who therefore cannot be in proximity to a gravesite. However, during the yahrzeits of the two Rebbes, thousands of people crowd into the ohel, effectively blocking the opening and spreading tumas meis from the graves into the yeshiva building. The administration now posts a sign warning kohanim to stay out of the yeshiva building on the day of a yahrzeit.
