= A Better Safe Than Sorry Book =

2012 children's book by Ella Bargai and Nitai Melamed

A Better Safe Than Sorry Book, published in Israel in 2012, is a children's book aimed at Haredi Jewish children addressing the issue of child sexual abuse and warning children to stay away from sex abusers. The book is a collaboration between Ella Bargai, a secular Jew, and Nitai Melamed, an Orthodox rabbi.

== Reception ==
The book has generally been well-received, selling out of its first printing soon after being released. Rabbis from the Hasidic, Lithuanian, and Sephardic communities have endorsed it. However, the Gur Hasidim have rejected the book because it includes women and girls in addition to men and boys.
