= Ohel (grave) =

Structure built around a Jewish grave

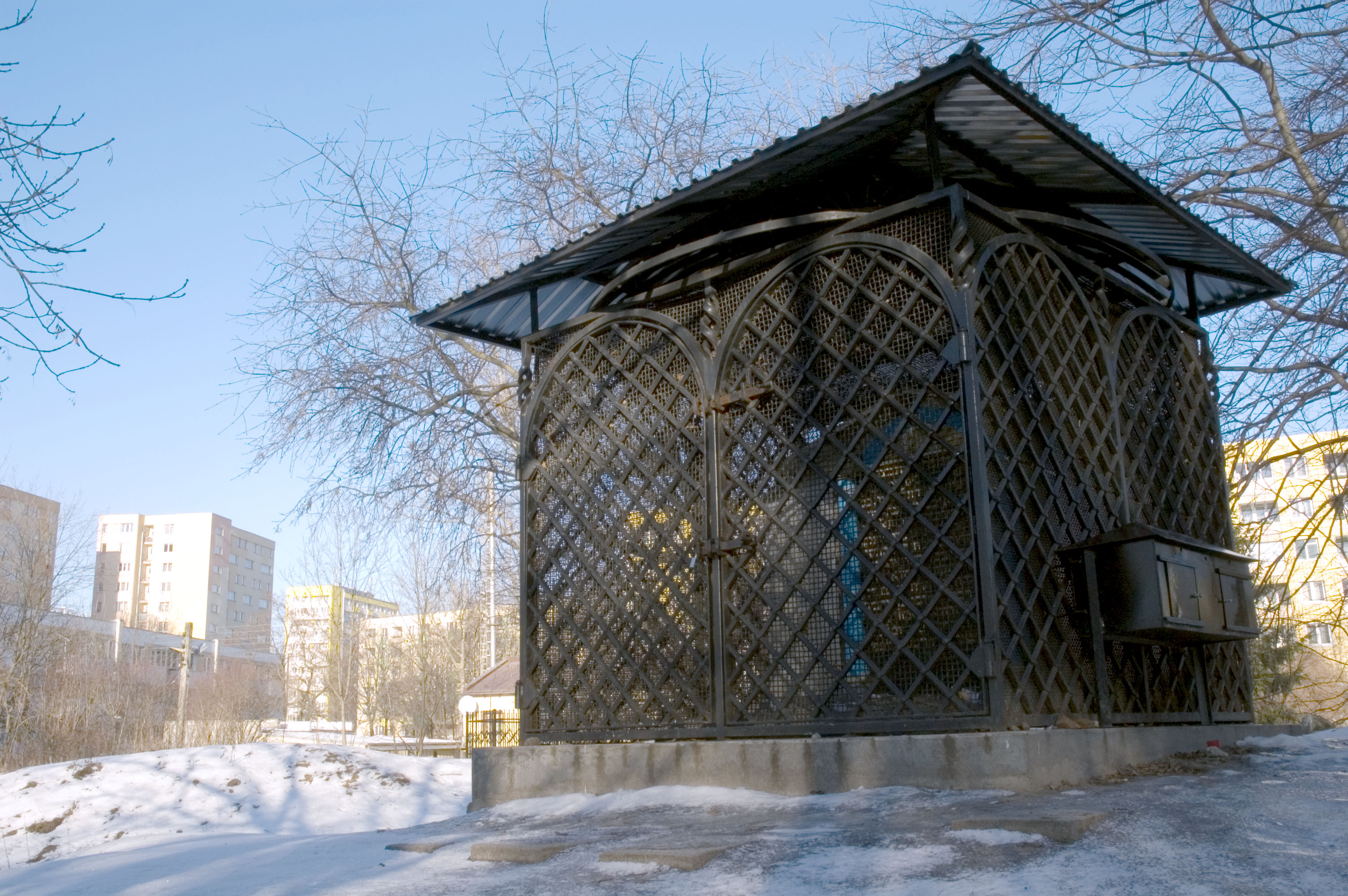
The ohel of the "Seer of Lublin" on the Old Jewish Cemetery in Lublin

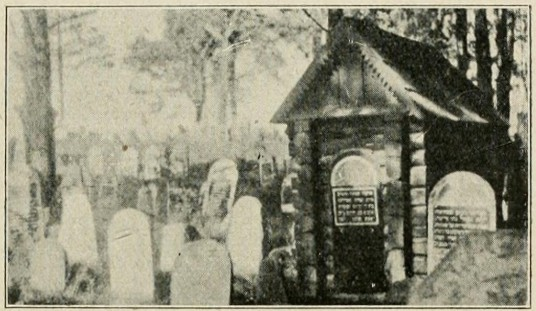
Wooden ohel in Horodyszcze (now Haradzishcha, Belarus)

Ohel (Hebrew: אוהל; plural: ohelim, literally, "tent") is a structure built around a Jewish grave as a sign of prominence of the deceased. Ohelim cover the graves of some (but not all) Hasidic Rebbes, important rabbis, tzadikim, prominent Jewish community leaders, and biblical figures. Typically a small masonry building, an ohel may include room for visitors to pray, meditate, and light candles in honor of the deceased.

== Sources ==
According to Krajewska, the tradition of covering a grave with an ohel may be based on the Cave of the Patriarchs, in which Abraham buried Sarah. Nolan Menachemson suggests that the Hasidic tradition of covering the graves of Rebbes with an ohel derives from the Ohel Moed ("Tent of Meeting") in which Moses communicated with God during the Israelites' travels in the desert.

== Construction ==
Ohelim are usually simple masonry structures. They may include one or two windows. In prewar Poland, the ohel of a Rebbe was located close by the Hasidic court, and was big enough to accommodate a minyan of ten men beside the grave.

The ohel of the Lubavitcher Rebbes in Queens, New York, is unusual in that it does not have a roof. This allows kohanim to visit the graves without coming into contact with impurity from the dead.

== Use ==
In the case of a Hasidic Rebbe, the ohel is a place for visitors to pray, meditate, write kvitelekh (petitionary prayer notes) and light candles in honor of the deceased. Ohelim of Hasidic Rebbes, as well as the tombs of tzadikim venerated by Moroccan Jews, serve as year-round pilgrimage sites, with the biggest influx of visitors coming on the rebbe or tzadik's yom hillula (anniversary of death).

== Notable ohelim ==
One or more graves may be included in the same ohel. Notable ohelim include:

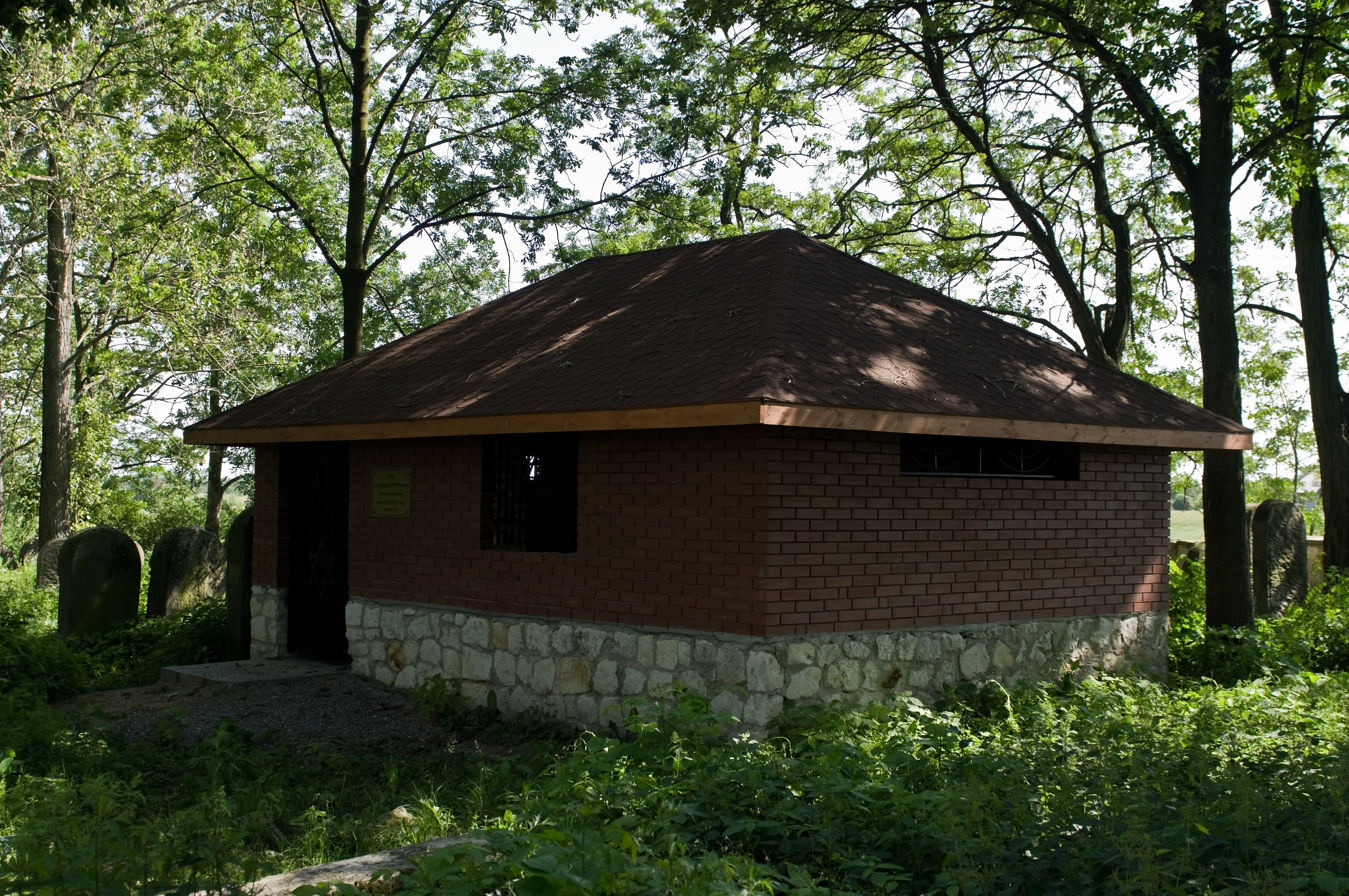
Ohel at the Jewish cemetery of Ożarów, Poland

=== Single-grave ohel ===
- Baba Sali, Netivot, Israel
- Chida, Har HaMenuchot, Jerusalem
- Yonatan ben Uziel, Amuka, Israel
- Elimelech of Lizhensk, Leżajsk, Poland
- Chaim Ozer Grodzinski, leader of pre-war Eastern European Jewry
- Nachman of Breslov, Uman, Ukraine
- Nathan of Breslov, Breslov, Ukraine
- Rachel, wife of Rabbi Akiva, Tiberias, Israel
- Vilna Gaon, Vilnius, Lithuania

=== Multiple-grave ohel ===
- Avraham Mordechai Alter and Pinchas Menachem Alter, the third and sixth rebbes of Ger, Jerusalem
- Baal Shem Tov, Ze'ev Wolf Kitzes, the Degel Machaneh Ephraim, the Apter Rav, and Rabbi Boruch of Medzhybizh, Medzhybizh, Ukraine
- Avrohom Bornsztain and his son Rabbi Shmuel Bornsztain, Sochatchover Rebbes
- Dov Ber of Mezeritch and Zusha of Anipoli
- Shlomo Halberstam and Naftali Halberstam, the third and fourth Bobover Rebbes, New York
- Yosef Yitzchok Schneersohn and Rabbi Menachem Mendel Schneerson, the sixth and seventh Lubavitcher Rebbes, Queens, New York
- Joel Teitelbaum and Moses Teitelbaum, first and second Satmar Rebbes

=== Biblical figures and Talmudic sages ===
Biblical figures and Mishnaic and Talmudic sages are typically buried in ohelim:

- Benjamin (near Kfar Saba, Israel)
- Esther and Mordechai, Hamadan, Iran
- Habakkuk, northern Israel
- Judah, Yehud, Israel
- Rabbi Meir or Rabbi Meir Baal HaNes (Rabbi Meir the miracle maker) was a Jewish sage who lived in the time of the Mishna.
- Rachel, near Bethlehem
- Simeon bar Yochai, Meron, Israel is the site of a large annual Lag BaOmer celebration
- Yose HaGelili, Dalton, Israel

== Gallery ==
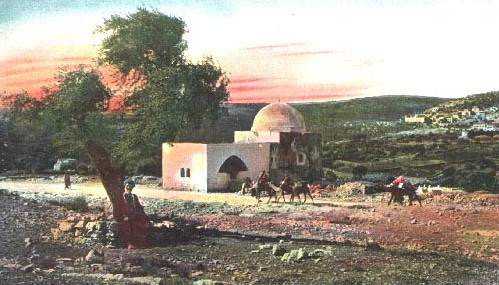
Rachel's Tomb, covered by a distinctive, dome-shaped ohel, as it appeared circa 1910

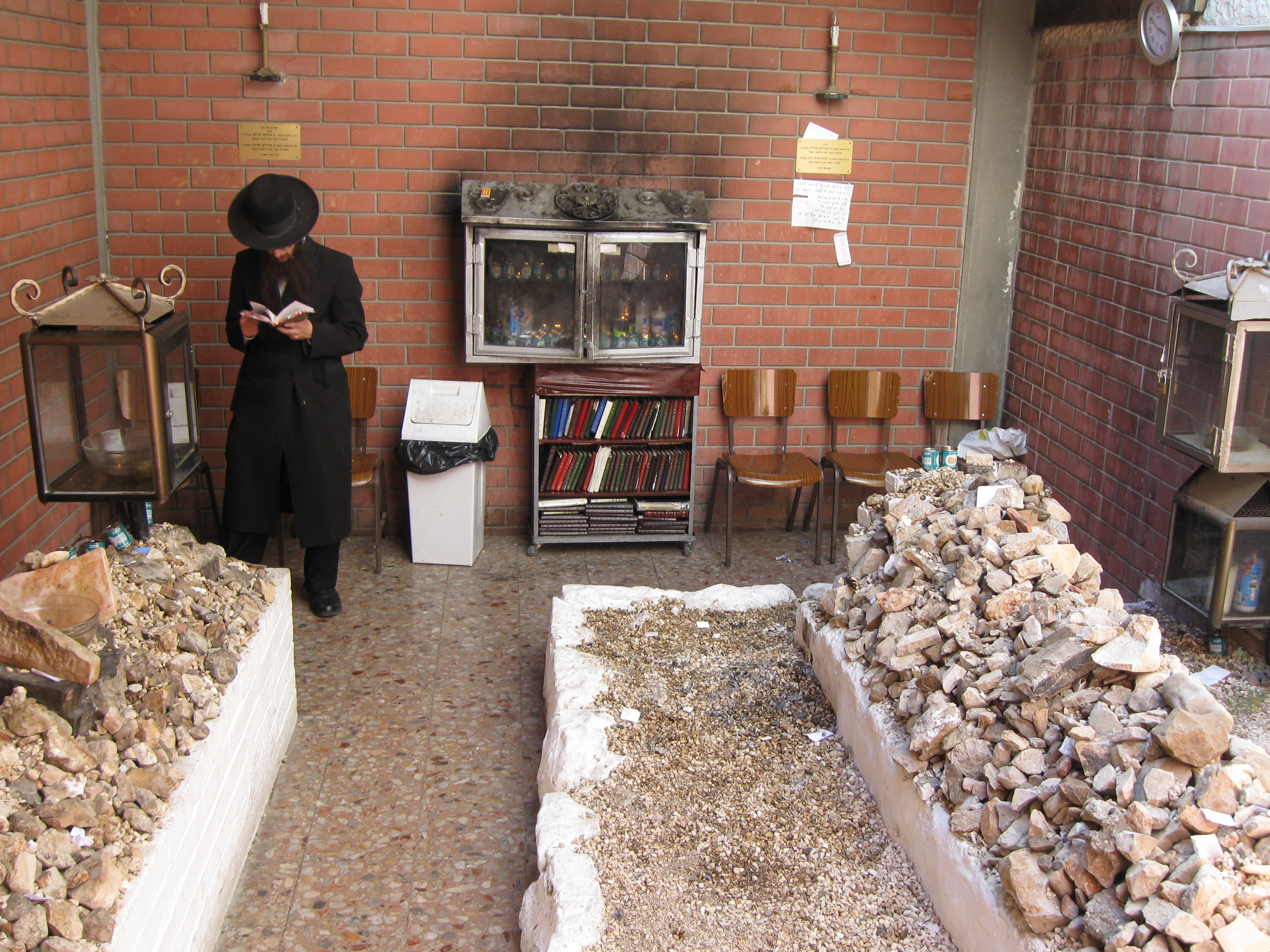
The graves of Avraham Mordechai Alter (right) and his son, Pinchas Menachem Alter (left) in an ohel adjacent to the Sfas Emes Yeshiva in downtown Jerusalem

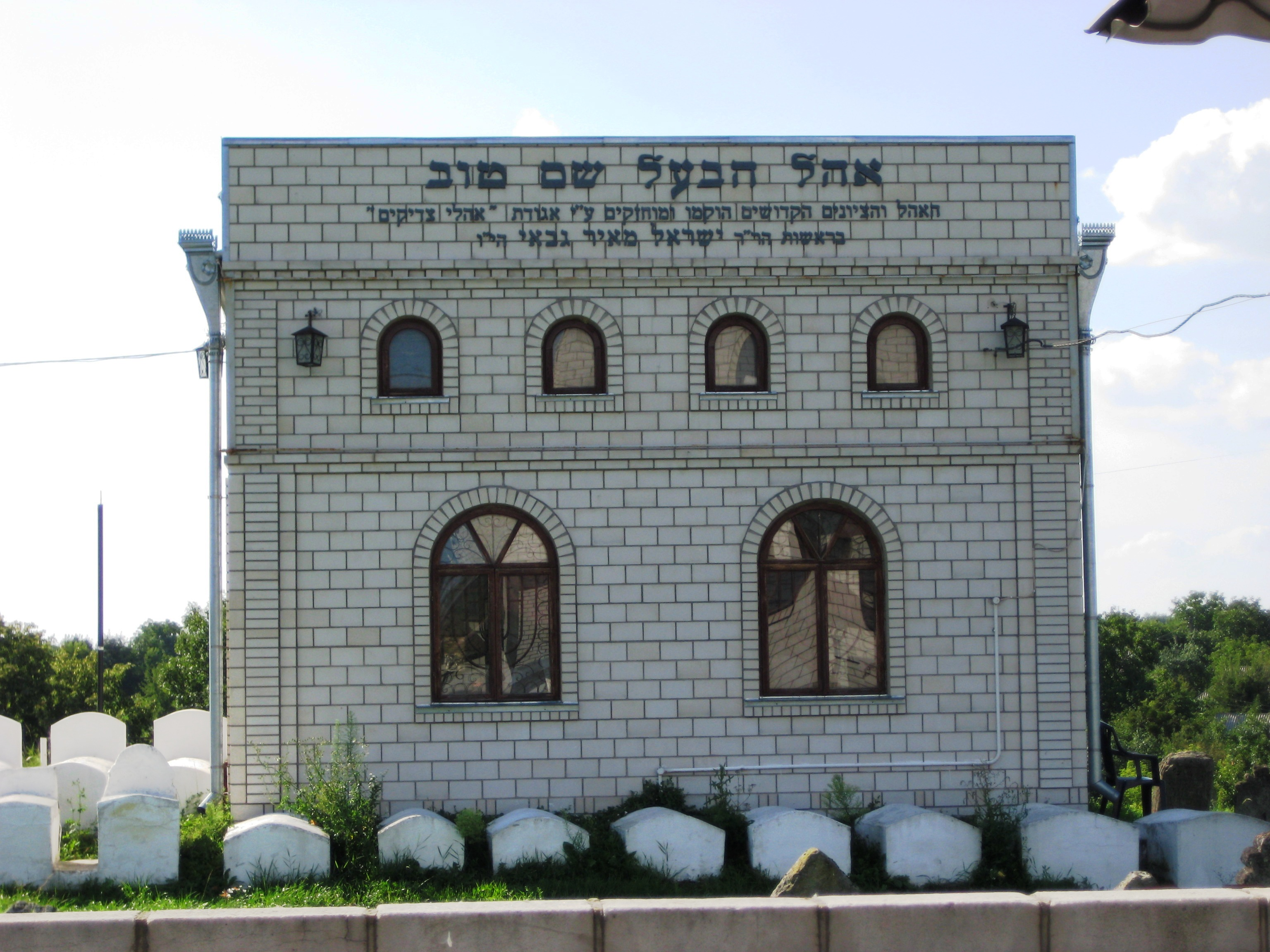
Ohel of the Baal Shem Tov in Medzhybizh, Ukraine

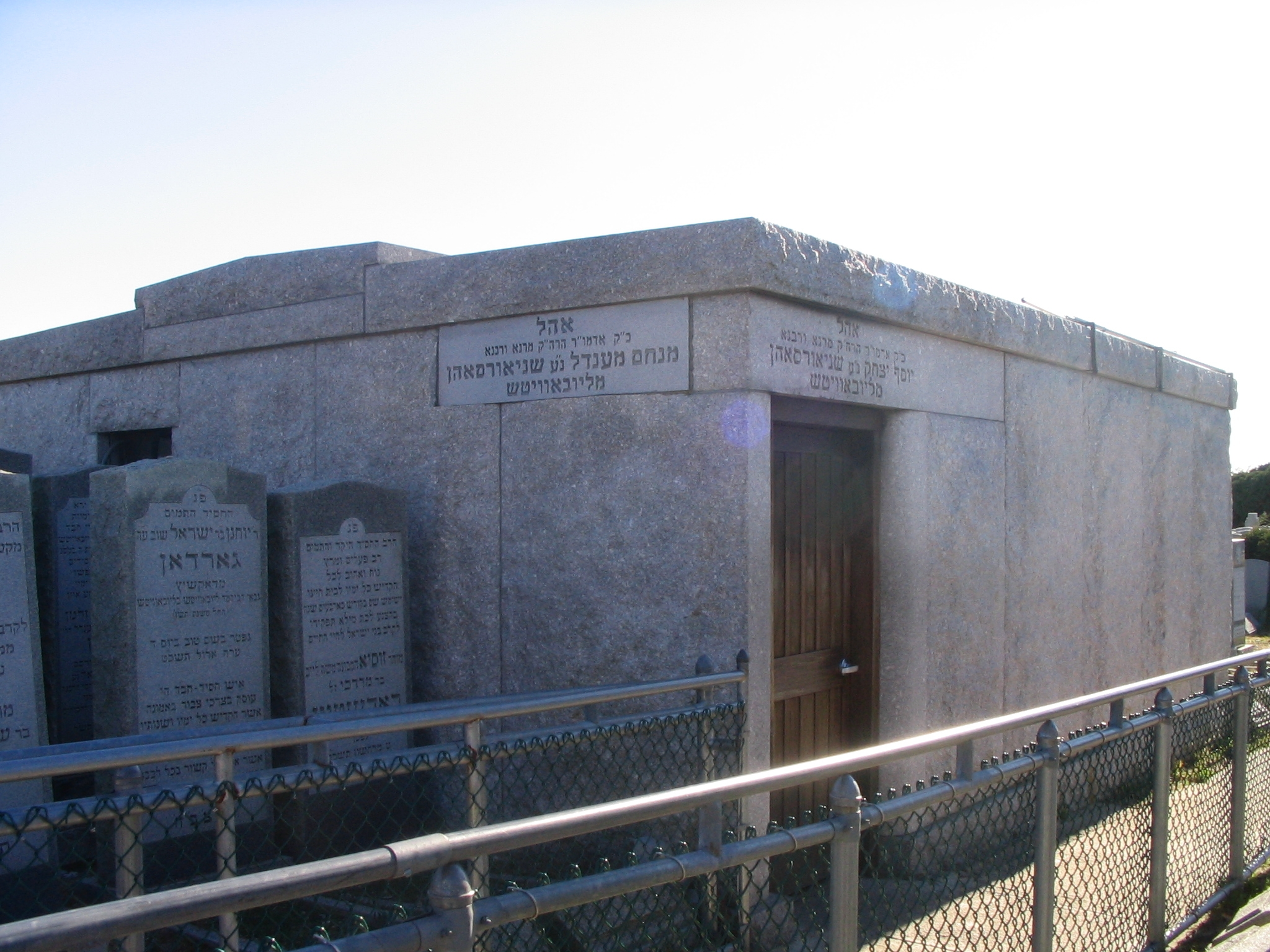
Ohel of the Lubavitcher Rebbes in Queens, New York

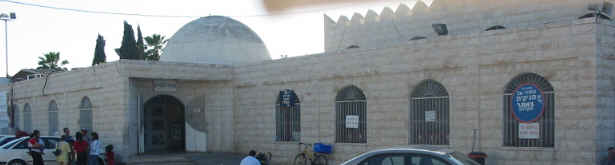
Tomb of the Baba Sali in Netivot, Israel

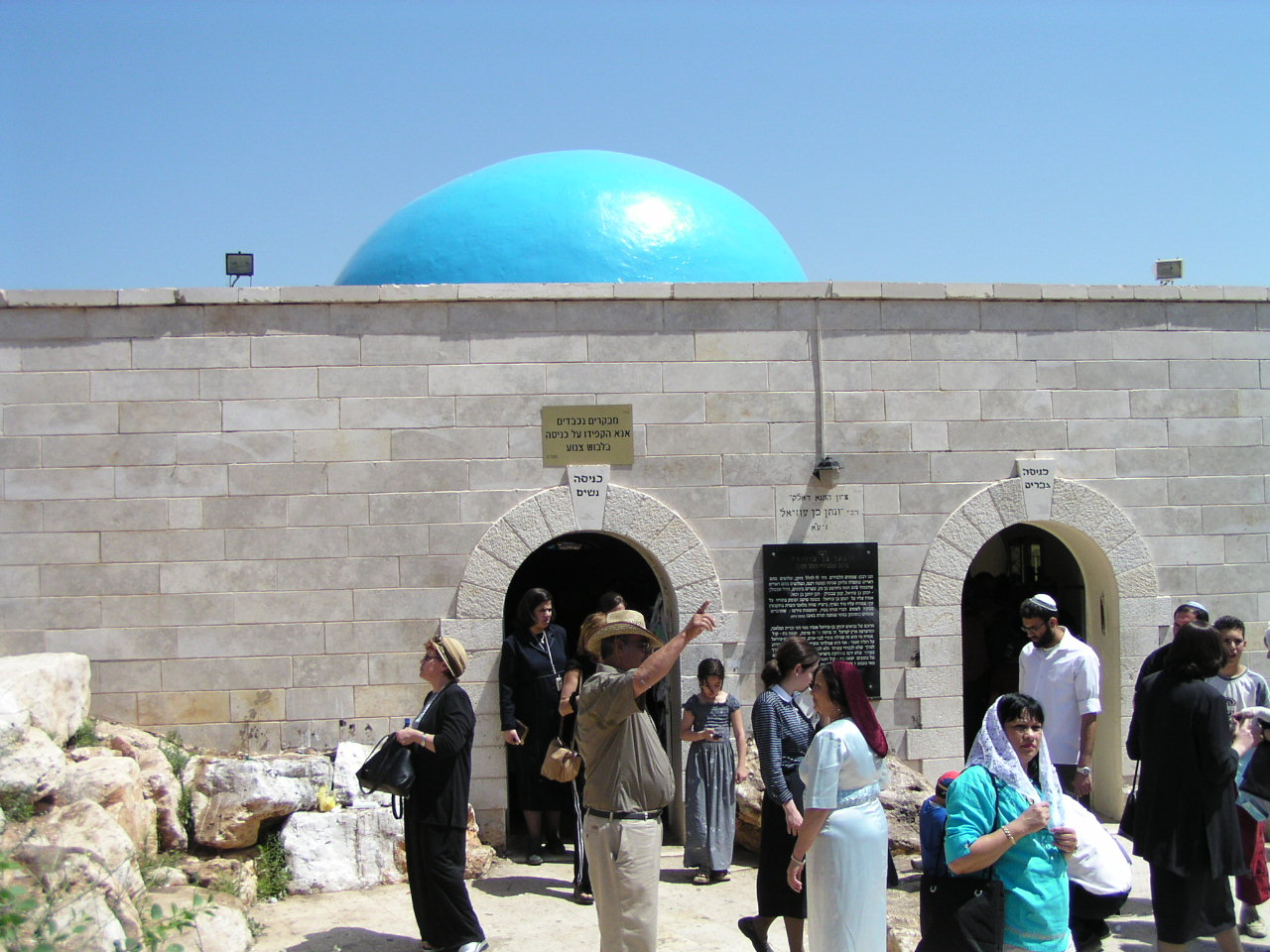
Ohel of Rabbi Jonathan ben Uzziel in Amuka, Israel

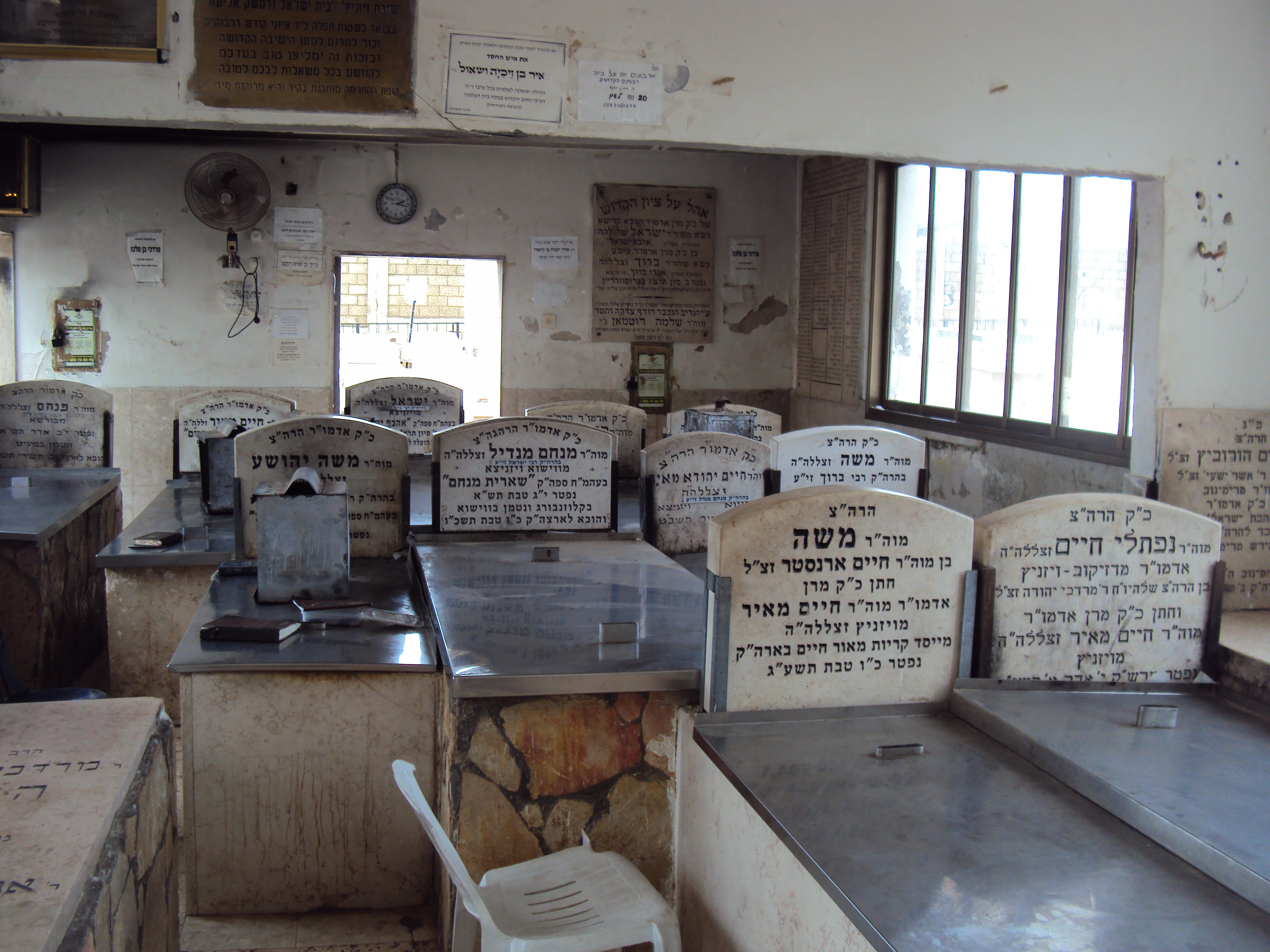
Ohel of the Vizhnitzer Rebbes in Bnei Brak

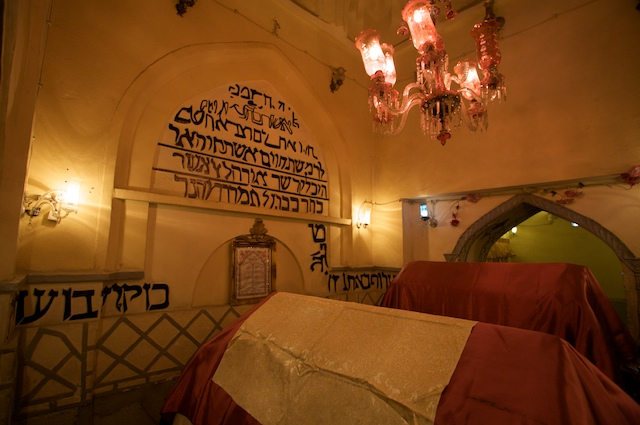
Interior of ohel of Esther and Mordechai in Hamadan, Iran

== See also ==
- List of burial places of biblical figures

== Sources ==
- Biale, David; Assaf, David; Brown, Benjamin; Gellman, Uriel; Heilman, Samuel; Rosman, Moshe; Green, Arthur; Sagiv, Gadi; Wodziński, Marcin; et al. (2017). Hasidim: A New History. Princeton University Press. ISBN 978-1400889198.
- Kadish, Sharman (2006). Jewish Heritage in England: An Architectural Guide. English Heritage. ISBN 190562428X.
- Krajewska, Monika (1993). A Tribe of Stones: Jewish Cemeteries in Poland. Polish Scientific Publishers. ISBN 978-8301112318.
- Menachemson, Nolan (2007). A Practical Guide to Jewish Cemeteries. Avotaynu. ISBN 978-1886223295.
- Miller, Chaim (2014). Turning Judaism Outward: A Biography of Rabbi Menachem Mendel Schneerson, the Seventh Lubavitcher Rebbe. Kol Menachem. ISBN 978-1934152362.
- Rabinowicz, Tzvi (1996). The Encyclopedia of Hasidism. Jason Aronson. ISBN 1568211236.
- Steinmetz, Sol (2005). Dictionary of Jewish Usage: A Guide to the Use of Jewish Terms. Rowman & Littlefield. ISBN 0742543870.
