= Yaakov Aryeh Alter =

Israeli rabbi

Rabbi Yaakov Aryeh Alter יעקב אריה אלתר
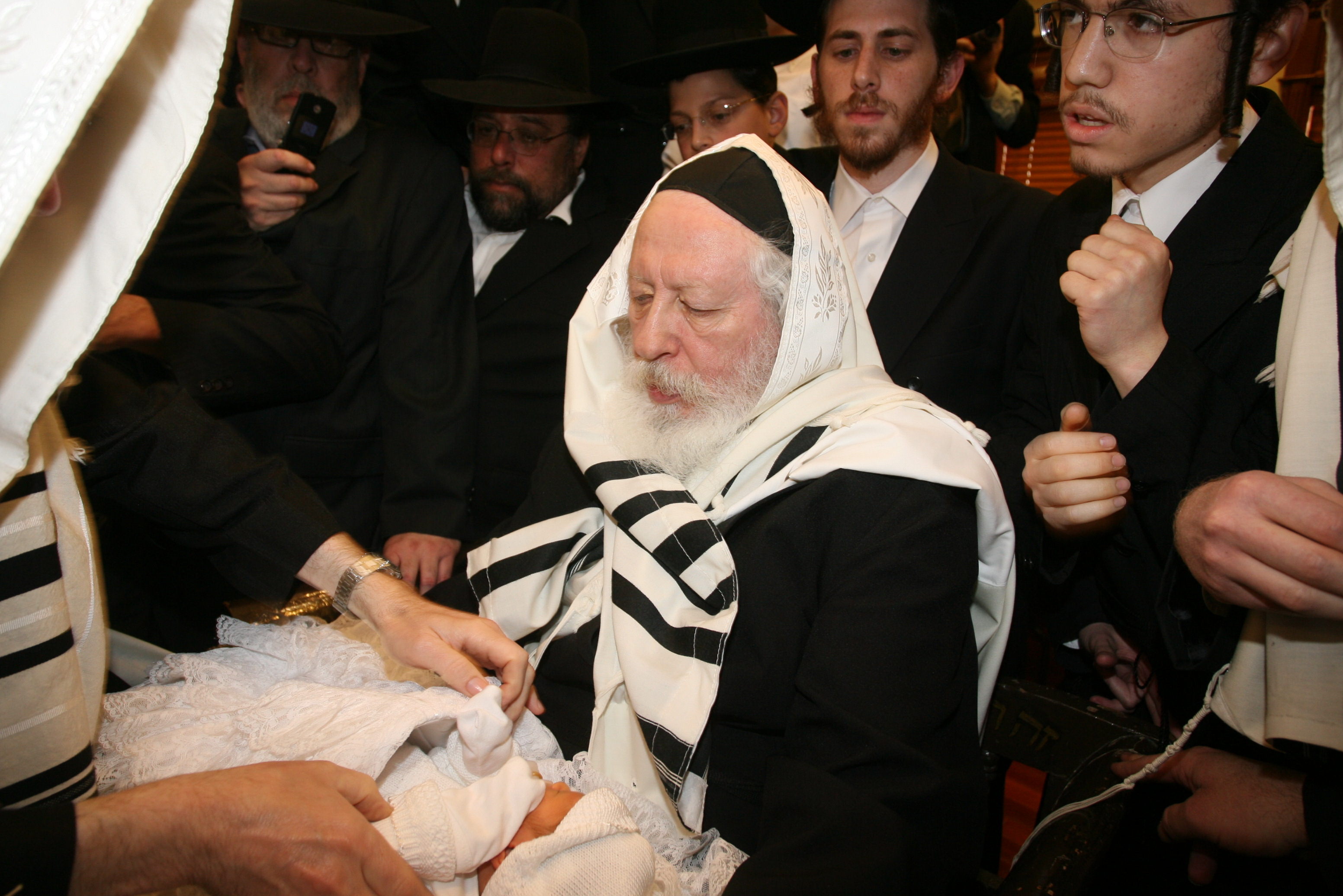
- Alter as Sandek at a bris milah
- Title: Gerrer Rebbe, March 1996 to the present

Personal life
- Born: Yaakov Aryeh Alter; 18 May 1939 (age 87) Łódź, Poland
- Parents: Simcha Bunim Alter (father); Yuta Hena Alter (mother)
- Dynasty: Ger

Religious life
- Religion: Judaism

Jewish leader
- Predecessor: Pinchas Menachem Alter
- Dynasty: Ger

Yaakov Aryeh Alter (Polish: Jakub Arie Alter, Hebrew: יעקב אריה אלתר, born 18 May 1939) is the seventh, and current, Rebbe of the Hasidic dynasty of Ger, a position he has held since 1996. He lives in Israel, and has followers there and in the United States, Europe, Australia, Brazil and Canada. He is a member of the Presidium of the Moetzes Gedolei HaTorah of Agudath Israel.

== Life ==
Yaakov Aryeh Alter was born on 18 May 1939, 29 Iyar 5699 in Łódź, Poland, to Rabbi Simcha Bunim Alter, also known as the Lev Simcha, who later became the sixth Gerrer Rebbe, and Yuta Henya, daughter of Rabbi Nehemiah Alter, his grandfather's brother. He was named after his ancestor Rabbi Yaakov Aryeh Guterman of Radzymin. In 1940, he immigrated, with his father and grandfather (Rebbe Avraham Mordechai Alter), to Eretz Israel. He studied in the Talmud Torah Etz Chaim. For many years, he studied Torah at a synagogue known as Rashi Shtiebel in Bnei Brak. He married Shoshana, daughter of Rabbi Menachem Mendel Weitz, one of the heads of Yeshivat Chiddushei HaRim.

Alter is one of the wealthiest people in the Haredi sector and in Israel in general, and in 2012, he was ranked third on the list of the richest rabbis in Israel, with a net worth of approximately NIS 350 million to NIS 500 million (between approximately $95 million and $135 million) due to real estate investments his father made in north Tel Aviv, Arsuf, and Jerusalem before Israel's establishment. Despite his wealth, he lived in an apartment in an ordinary residential building in the Chazon Ish neighborhood in Bnei Brak until 2011, when he moved to Jerusalem.

He and his wife have five sons and four daughters. In 2019, it was reported that one of Alter's sons was accused of sexually molesting two young male students from amongst Alter's followers.

In 1996, after the passing of Pinchas Menachem Alter, his nephew Yaakov Aryeh Alter became the Rebbe of Ger.

In 2007, approximately 50,000 people attended the wedding of Alter's oldest grandson in Jerusalem.

In 2016, Alter's followers were estimated at 11,859 families.

In 2019, Alter's cousin Shaul Alter and his followers split off, forming Kehilas Pnei Menachem. As of 2021, membership of Shaul Alter's breakaway faction consisted of some 300 families.

In 2022, an estimated 60,000 people, including Rabbis Yisrael Meir Lau, Yitzhak Yosef, Yitzchok Zilberstein, and Nachum Dov Brayer, attended the wedding of Alter's granddaughter.
