= Góra Kalwaria =

Town in Masovian Voivodeship, Poland

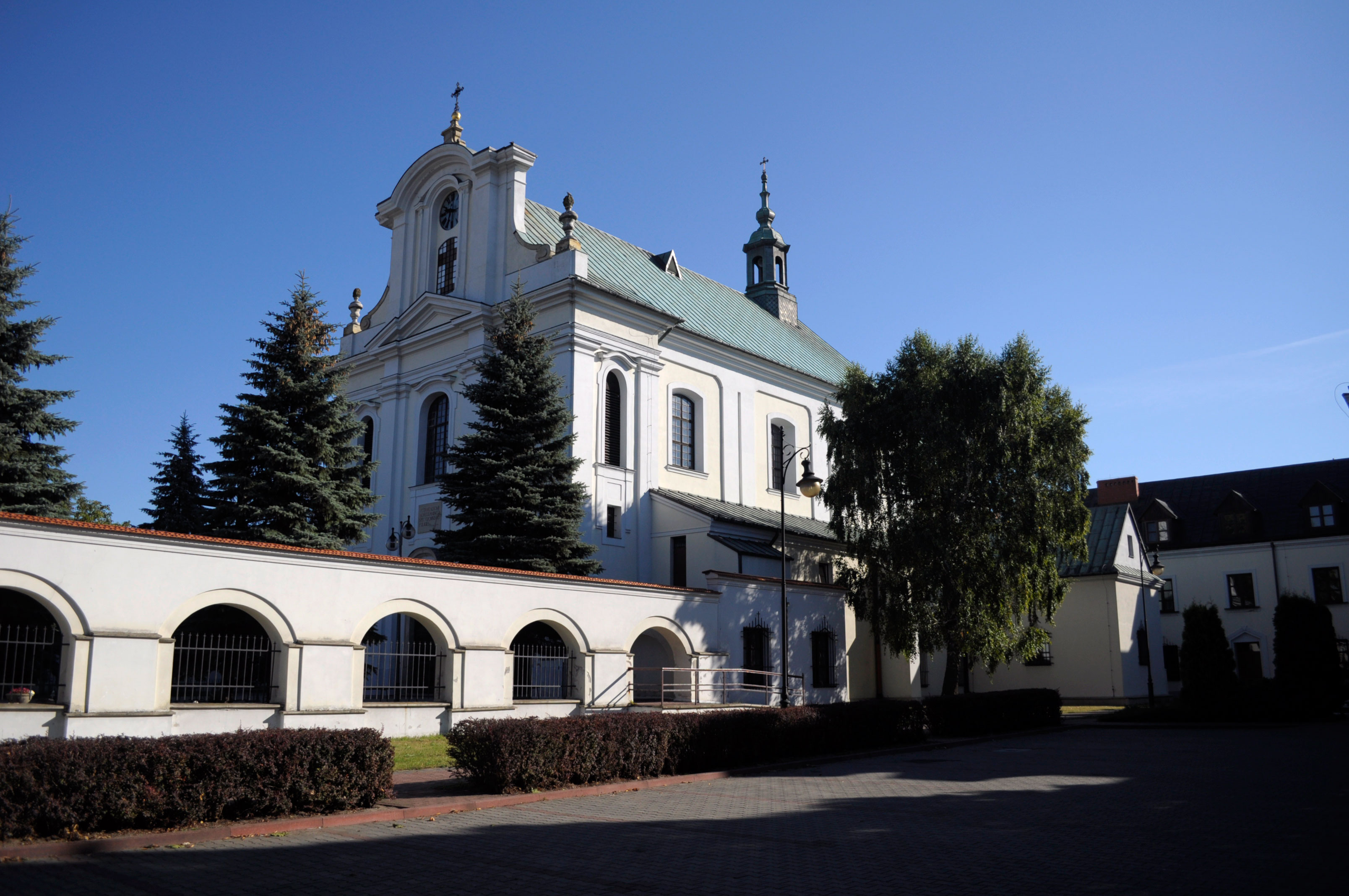
- Catholic Church of the Immaculate Conception

- Flag Coat of arms

- Location within Poland
- Coordinates: 51°58′24″N 21°12′52″E
- Country: Poland
- Voivodeship: Masovian
- County: Piaseczno
- Gmina: Góra Kalwaria
- Established: 13th century
- Town rights: 1670

Government
  - Mayor: Arkadiusz Strzyżewski

Area
  - Total: 13.72 km^{2} (5.30 sq mi)

Population (2019)
  - Total: 12,109
  - Density: 882.6/km^{2} (2,286/sq mi)
- Time zone: UTC+1 (CET)
  - Summer (DST): UTC+2 (CEST)
- Postal code: 05-530
- Area code: +48 22
- Car plates: WPI
- Website: http://www.gorakalwaria.pl

Góra Kalwaria (Polish pronunciation: [ˈɡura kalˈvarja]; "Calvary Mountain") is a town on the Vistula River in the Masovian Voivodeship, in east-central Poland. It is situated approximately 35 kilometres (22 miles) southeast of Warsaw and has a population of around 12,109 (as of 2019). The town has strong religious significance for both Catholic Christians and Hasidic Jews of the Ger dynasty.

== History ==
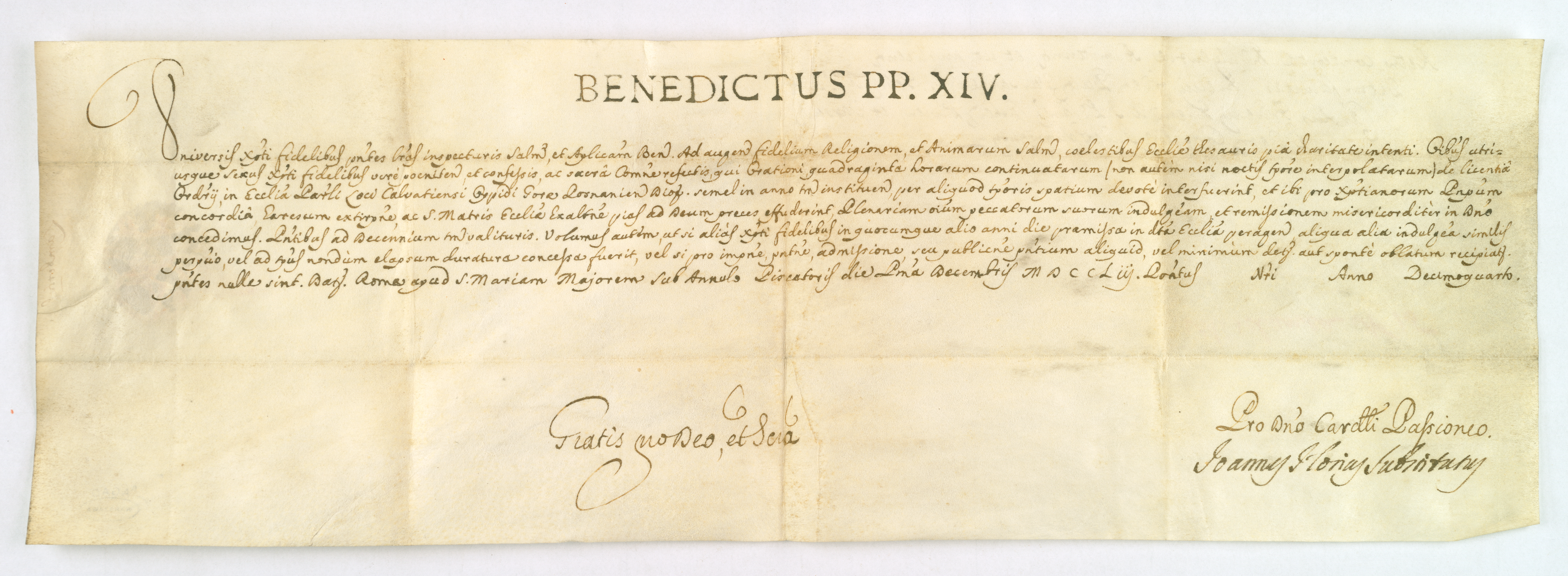
Privilege of Pope Benedict XIV from 1753 for the parish church in Góra Kalwaria

The village of Góra already existed in the 13th century. It was a private village of Polish nobility, administratively located in the Czersk County in the Masovian Voivodeship in the Greater Poland Province of the Kingdom of Poland. Completely destroyed during a Swedish occupation known as the Deluge, in 1666, it became the property of Stefan Wierzbowski, Bishop of Poznań, who decided to found a new town on the ruins. His plan was to build a calvary - a religious center dedicated to passion plays and services, which was popular in the early modern Poland. He was encouraged by the fact that the local landscape resembled that of the Holy Land. Bishop was supported in his work by Stanislaus Papczyński.

In 1671, the town was renamed Nowa Jerozolima, granted city rights and construction work kicked off. The urban design was based on medieval maps of Jerusalem, and the street grid formed a Latin cross. The bishop invited Dominican, Bernardine and Piarist orders to settle in the town, which soon became dotted with monasteries, churches, chapels and passion paths (such as stations of the Cross). The town was supposed to be a purely Christian one and Jews were not allowed to settle there.

After Bishop Wierzbowski's death and the Partitions of Poland the decline of the town began. Many churches and chapels were pulled down, and in the years 1883–1919 Góra Kalwaria was deprived of town rights.

In the early 19th century, the ban on Jewish settlement was lifted and afterwards Jews became the predominant group in the town, also due to their expulsion from Russia (see Pale of Settlement). Góra Kalwaria then became one of the major centers of Hasidic Judaism and home to the Ger dynasty.

In 1815, the town fell to the Russian Partition of Poland. During the January Uprising, several clashes between Polish insurgents and Russian troops took place in the town or its environs. The clashes took place on 27 January, 4 March and 12 April 1863 and 1 February 1864.

=== 20th century ===
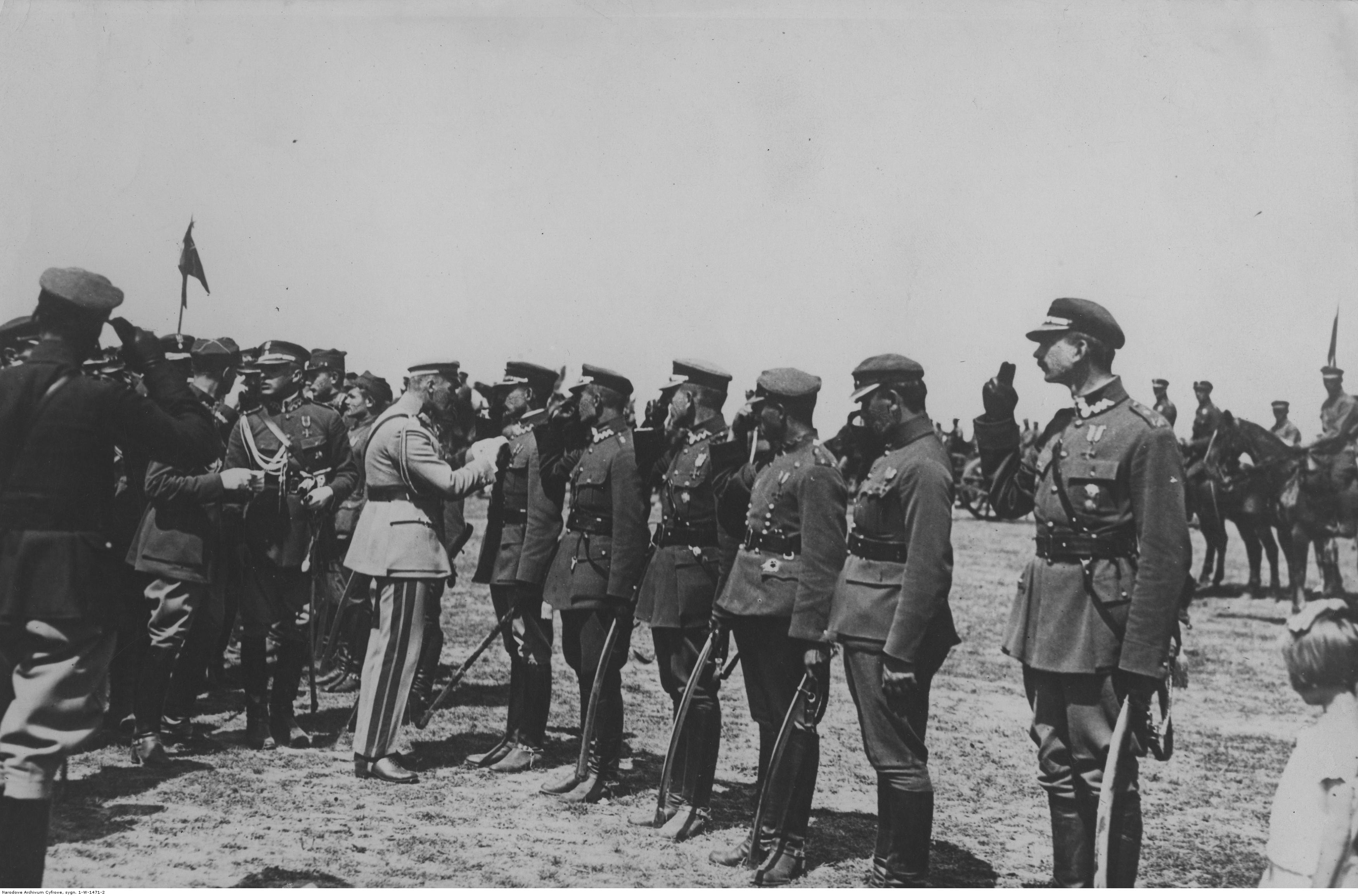
Marshal Józef Piłsudski awards Polish artillerymen with the Virtuti Militari in Góra Kalwaria in 1921

During World War I, Góra Kalwaria was occupied by Germany. On 11 November 1918, the day Poland regained independence, local Polish firefighters led by Szymon Adamiec disarmed the German troops without a fight and liberated the town.

In 1919, during the Polish–Soviet War, several Polish horse artillery squadrons were formed in the town. On 13–14 August 1920, Poles successfully defended the town from the invading Russians. During the Battle of Warsaw (1920), a hospital for wounded Polish troops was organized in Góra Kalwaria. To commemorate the Polish victory, Marshal Józef Piłsudski awarded 133 Polish artillerymen with the Virtuti Militari in a ceremony held in the town in August 1921. In the interbellum, the Polish Border Guard Main School was located in the town until 1933, and then the 1st Heavy Artillery Regiment was stationed there.

Following the joint German-Soviet invasion of Poland, which started World War II in September 1939, the town was occupied by Germany. The Germans arrested local Catholic priests. 23 Polish policemen from the town and officers from the local garrison were murdered by the Russians in the large Katyn massacre in April–May 1940. During the Holocaust, the Jewish population of the town was first concentrated in a small ghetto. In 1942, it was transferred to the Warsaw Ghetto and from there to the Treblinka extermination camp. 3,500 Jews from Góra Kalwaria died in World War II. Some of the Poles who were expelled from Warsaw after the Warsaw Uprising relocated to Góra Kalwaria in 1944. Before the advance of the eastern front, the German army expelled the town's population. In 1945, the town was restored to Poland, although with a Soviet-installed communist regime, which then stayed in power until the Fall of Communism in the 1980s. After the Fall of Communism, pre-war monuments dedicated to Marshal Józef Piłsudski and the Polish heroes of the Polish–Soviet War were restored.

== Demographics ==
Historic architecture (examples)

Immaculate Conception church

Former Bernardine Monastery

Town hall

Exaltation of the Holy Cross church

Historical population

Year	Pop.	±%
1910	6,243	—
1921	5,496	−12.0%
1931	7,097	+29.1%
1939	7,279	+2.6%

Year	Pop.	±%
1950	5,505	−24.4%
1960	7,151	+29.9%
2010	11,428	+59.8%

== Transport ==
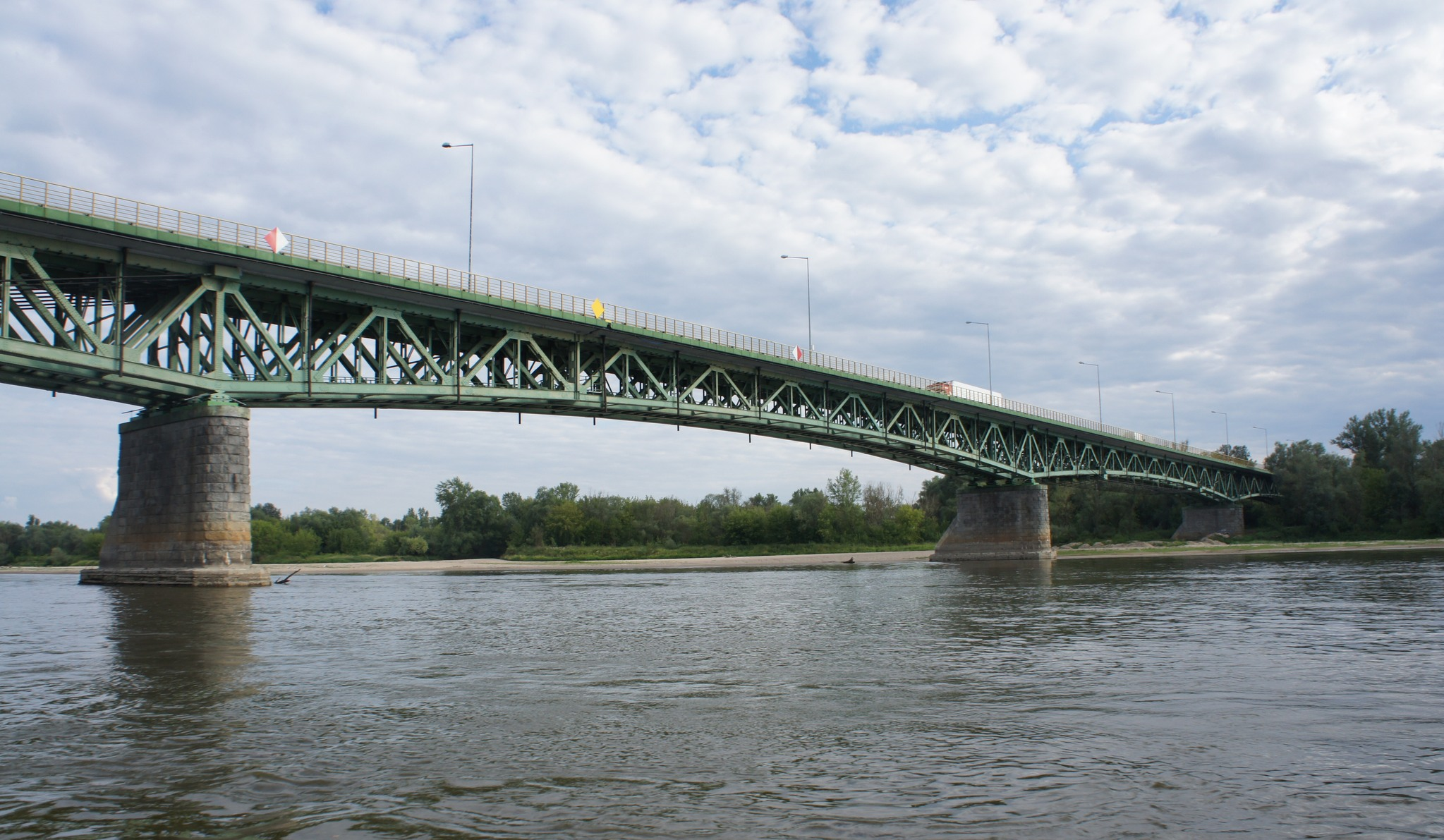
Bridge over the Vistula river, part of the National road 50

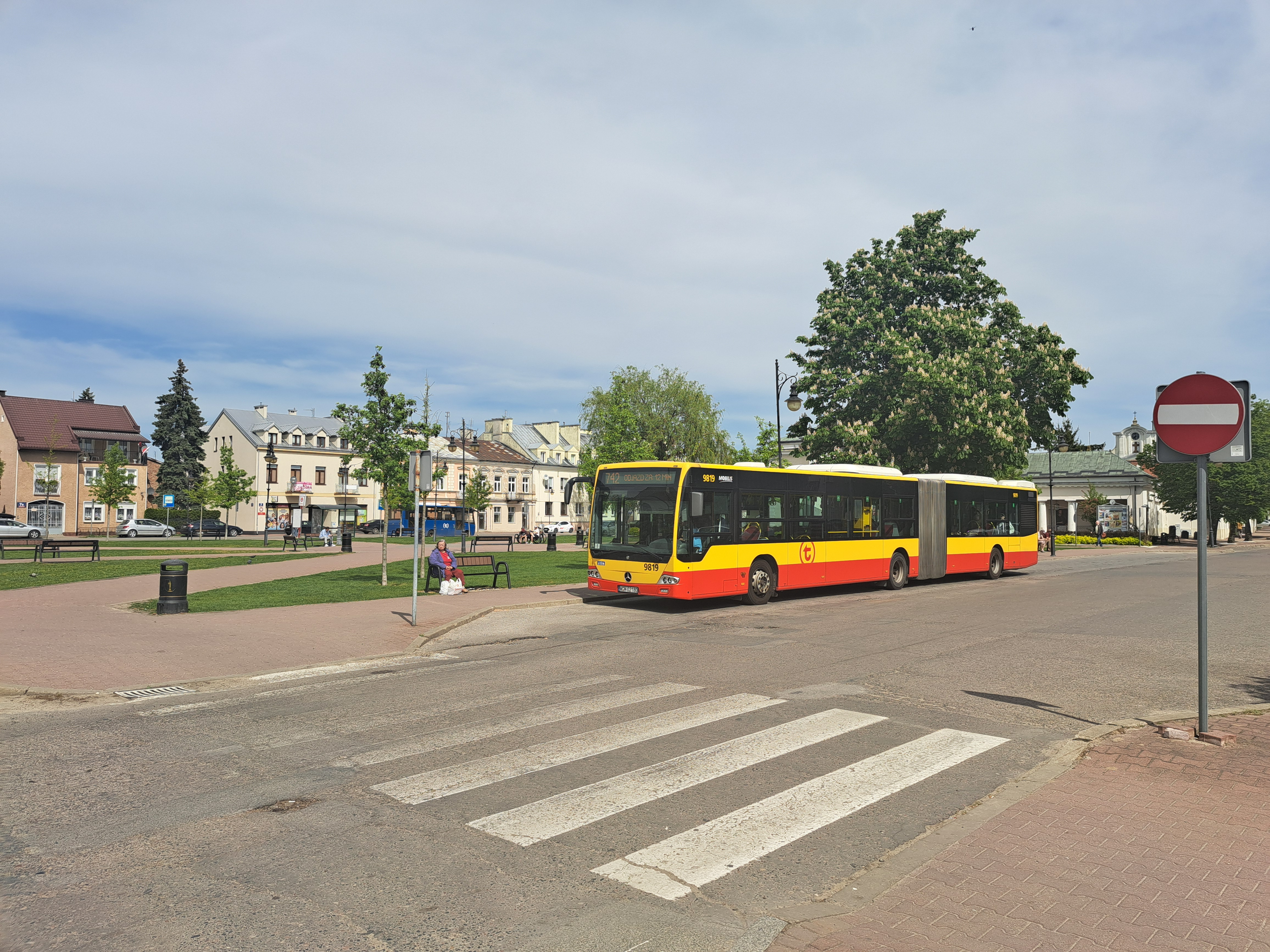
Bus in Góra Kalwaria

The Polish National roads No. 50 and 79 and the Polish railway line No. 12 (Skierniewice—Łuków) bypass the town. There is an inland port on the Vistula river in Góra Kalwaria. The main roads of Góra Kalwaria is Pijarska.

== Sports ==
The main sports club of the town is Korona Góra Kalwaria with football, boxing and chess sections.

== People ==
- Rebbes of Ger (Alter family)
  - Yitzchak Meir Alter
  - Yehudah Aryeh Leib Alter
  - Avraham Mordechai Alter
  - Yisrael Alter
  - Simchah Bunim Alter
  - Pinchas Menachem Alter
- Pinchas Menachem Justman, The Piltzer Rebbe
- Dov Berish Einhorn, The Amstover Rav
- Józef Chaciński, politician and lawyer
- Yitzhak-Meir Levin (born Izaak Meir Lewin, 1893–1971), member of the Sejm and signatory of the Israeli declaration of independence
- Wolf Messing, a mentalist
- Yankel Talmud (1885-1965), Ger court composer

== See also ==
- Kalwaria Zebrzydowska
- Battle of Warsaw (1920)
- Battle of Radzymin (1944)
