= Yisrael Alter =

Fourth Gerrer Rebbe

- ישראל אלתר
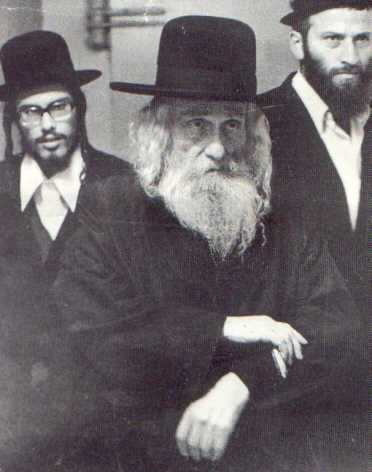
- Title: Gerrer Rebbe

Personal life
- Born: Yisrael Alter; 12 October 1895 Gora Kalwaria
- Died: 20 February 1977 (aged 81) Jerusalem
- Parents: Avraham Mordechai Alter (father); Chaya Ruda Czarna (mother)
- Dynasty: Ger

Religious life
- Religion: Judaism

Jewish leader
- Predecessor: Avraham Mordechai Alter
- Successor: Simcha Bunim Alter
- Began: 1948
- Ended: 20 February 1977
- Main work: Beit Yisrael
- Dynasty: Ger

Yisrael Alter (Polish: Izrael Alter, Hebrew: ישראל אלתר; October 1895 – 20 February 1977), also known as the Beit Yisrael, after the works he authored, was the fourth Rebbe of the Hasidic dynasty of Ger, a position he held from 1948 until 1977.

== Biography ==
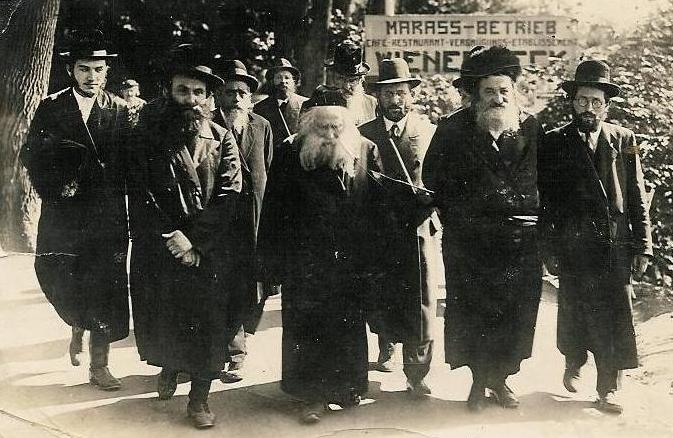
Young Rabbi Yisrael Alter walking beside his father, the Imrei Emes.

Yisrael Alter was born in Poland on the holiday of Isru Chag Sukkot (1894), the third son of Rabbi Avraham Mordechai Alter. Until the age of ten, he studied with his grandfather, Rabbi Yehuda Aryeh Leib Alter, and was already known as a prodigy. He was particularly known for his strict adherence to time. At thirteen, he became engaged to Chaya Sarah, the daughter of his cousin Rabbi Yaakov Meir Biderman, and married her in 1910. They had two children, a daughter named Rivka Yocheved, born in 1917, and a son, Yehuda Aryeh Leib (Leibele), born in 1921.

Following his father's request for assistance, Yisrael began leading a group of young scholars within the Gerrer community, guiding them with spiritual teachings and personal instructions. This was confirmed by his brother, Rabbi Pinchas Menachem Alter, in a public address two weeks before his death.

In the month of Shevat 1932, Yisrael joined his father on his fourth journey to the Land of Israel and again in 1935 on the fifth trip. During the Holocaust, Yisrael fled with his father from Poland, eventually reaching Israel on the 8th of Nisan 1940. His immediate family—his wife and children—were murdered by the Nazis, as were most of the Gerrer Hasidim who lived in Poland. After his father's death in 1948, Yisrael was appointed as his successor in the Gerrer Hasidic dynasty. In the same year, he remarried Perel (Charlotte), the daughter of David Weinfeld. They had no children.

== In Israel ==
As the new Gerrer Rebbe, Yisrael worked to rebuild the Hasidic movement, increasing its influence and shaping its future direction. He gathered the remaining Gerrer Hasidim who had settled in Israel before the war, along with Holocaust survivors, and sought to bring back those who, or whose families, had distanced themselves from the Hasidic movement.

He is considered one of the major figures in the rebuilding of the Haredi community after the Holocaust, particularly in establishing public norms regarding modesty, gender segregation, and separation from secular culture. His influence extended far beyond Gerrer Hasidim, attracting followers from other segments of society.

=== Public activity ===
Yisrael’s public activities were primarily within the framework of Agudat Yisrael. He placed great emphasis on education, working with other Haredi leaders to establish the Independent Education System, an autonomous religious education framework. Additionally, he was instrumental in founding the Haredi daily newspaper, Hamodia, and worked tirelessly to secure its financial stability.

The importance Yisrael placed on education and religious journalism can be seen in the fact that during his leadership, he avoided fundraising campaigns for any cause, except for a single fundraiser for the newspaper Hamodia and another for Independent Education.

In addition to his role as Rebbe and leader of Gerrer Hasidim, Yisrael also served as the chairman of the Council of Torah Sages. Through this position, he exerted significant influence over the policies and direction of Agudat Yisrael, a movement co-founded by his father, Rabbi Avraham Mordechai Alter, known as the "Imrei Emes". He also supported and encouraged the re-establishment of Hasidic courts from various communities destroyed during the war.

== Leadership ==
=== Reintroducing the pilgrimage to the Rebbe ===
As part of the effort to rebuild Gerrer Hasidism after the Holocaust, Yisrael revived the custom of traveling to the Rebbe for Shabbat and holidays, a central feature of pre-war Hasidism. This pilgrimage became a cornerstone of the Hasidic way of life and a key means of maintaining a close connection between the Rebbe and his followers.

=== Conducting the Tisch ===
Yisrael's Tish (Hasidic feast) gatherings on Shabbat and holidays drew great attention. He placed significant importance on the Tish, and for nearly three decades of his leadership, only rarely did he miss conducting one, except when he was ill or resting in places like Haifa. He usually held two Tishes each Shabbat: one on Friday nights and another during the Seudah Shlishit (the third Shabbat meal), a time considered especially conducive to spiritual elevation in Hasidism (known as "Re'uta de'Re'uta").

=== Emphasis on Jewish values (Yiddishkeit) ===
Yisrael placed a strong emphasis on Jewish values, particularly modesty, education on safeguarding the covenant, and separating from permissive, secular society. He viewed these values as foundational to the survival of the Jewish people and believed that strict observance could avert severe decrees upon Israel. His famous saying was, "Yiddish doesn't matter, what matters is Yiddishkeit."

== Philosophy ==
=== Holiness and spiritual ascension ===
In the biographical book "Par Yisrael," Rabbi Baruch Vidislavsky, edited by Rabbi Aharon Sorsky, describes Yisrael’s leadership philosophy: "He demanded of his followers spiritual ascension and sanctification. He believed that one could not escape sin without distancing oneself from physical pleasures, even those that were not prohibited by Torah."

=== Stringencies and asceticism ===
Yisrael instituted a stringent code of conduct for his followers, designed to distance them from sin and elevate them spiritually. Among other things, he imposed restrictions on physical contact between spouses, limiting marital relations to the bare minimum necessary. These regulations sparked opposition from some rabbis, including Rabbi Yaakov Yisrael Kanievsky, who anonymously published a pamphlet criticizing Yisrael’s stringent approach. However, Kanievsky refrained from a public confrontation and expressed regret when his authorship was revealed.

== Death ==
Five years before his death, Yisrael underwent a successful surgery to remove a tumor from his intestines. He died in the Hadassah Ein Kerem hospital on the 2nd of Adar 1977, of intestinal gangrene due to arterial blockage, after refusing to be taken to the hospital on the preceding day, Shabbat. He was buried in the "Gerrer Cave" on Mount of Olives.
