= Simcha Bunim Alter =

Rebbe of the Hasidic dynasty (1898–1992)

- שמחה בונים אלתר
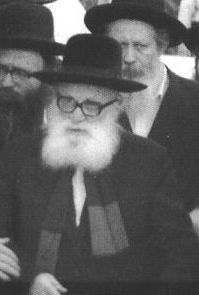
- Title: Gerrer Rebbe

Personal life
- Born: Simcha Bunim Mordechai Alter; 6 April 1898 Góra Kalwaria
- Died: 8 July 1992 (aged 94) Jerusalem
- Buried: Mount of Olives; 7 July 1992
- Spouse: Yuta Hena Alter
- Children: Chaya Ruda Yehudis Alter; Rivka Feyga Alter; Yaakov Aryeh Alter
- Parents: Avraham Mordechai Alter (father); Chaya Ruda Yehudis Czarna (mother)
- Dynasty: Ger

Religious life
- Religion: Judaism

Jewish leader
- Predecessor: Yisrael Alter
- Successor: Pinchas Menachem Alter
- Ended: March 1977 – July 8, 1992
- Main work: Lev Simcha
- Dynasty: Ger

Simcha Bunim Mordechai Alter (Hebrew: שמחה בונים אלתר; 6 April 1898 – 8 July 1992), also known as the Lev Simcha (לב שמחה), after the works he authored, was the fifth Rebbe of the Hasidic dynasty of Ger, a position he held from 1977 until his death.

== Biography ==
Alter was born in Góra Kalwaria to Haye Ruda and Avraham Mordechai Alter (1866-1948). Through his paternal family, Alter is a great-grandson of the founder of the Ger dynasty, Yitzchak Meir Alter (1789-1866). Alter married his first cousin Yuta (also Ita) in Poland and in 1923, he settled in Mandatory Palestine with his father-in-law Nehemiah Alter for several years. He obtained citizenship before returning to Poland, living in Warsaw and Łódź with his wife and children.

In 1934, Alter emigrated from Poland to Mandatory Palestine, where he started a real estate business. His father, who was the third Alter to led the Ger dynasty, joined the rest of the family in 1943. After the elder Alter relinquished the position, Alter's brother Yisrael was the fifth Rebbe until the latter's death in 1977.

Alter was a supporter of the Agudat Yisrael, which the Gur dynasty led along with schools of the Bethjacob movement and the Chinuch Atzmai. He campaigned for stricter religious laws, such as restrictions on abortions. In the 1980s, Alter opposed the opening of the BYU Jerusalem Center, a campus of the Mormon Brigham Young University.

In 1980, he instituted Yerushalmi Yomi, the daily learning of a page of the Jerusalem Talmud, similar to the renowned Daf Yomi for the Babylonian Talmud.

He died on 7 July 1992 (7th of Tammuz 5752), and was interred in the cave of the Gerrer Rebbes in the Mount of Olives cemetery.

His son, Yaakov Aryeh Alter, currently is the Grand Rabbi of Ger.
