= Ger (Hasidic dynasty) =

Polish Hasidic dynasty

Ger Hasidic Dynasty
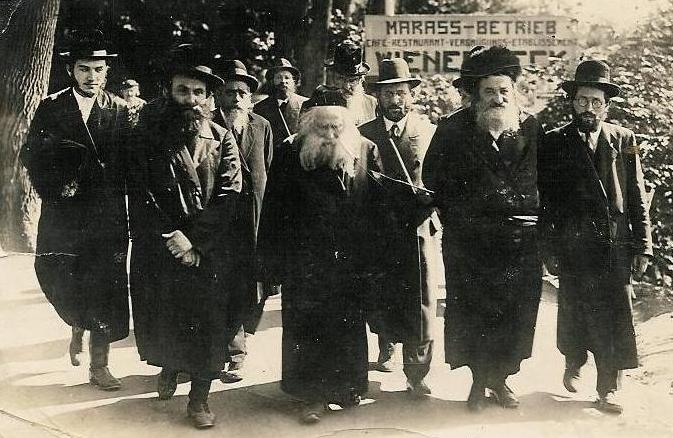
- Rabbi Avraham Mordechai Alter with his entourage

Total population
- 15,000 families (2024)

Founder
- Rabbi Yitzchak Meir Alter

Regions with significant populations
- Israel, United States, Europe

Religions
- Hasidic Judaism

Ger (Yiddish: גער, also Gur, adj. Gerrer) is a Polish Hasidic dynasty originating from the town of Góra Kalwaria, Poland, where it was founded by Yitzchak Meir Alter (1798–1866), known as the "Chiddushei HaRim". Ger is a branch of Peshischa Hasidism, as Yitzchak Meir Alter was a leading disciple of Simcha Bunim of Peshischa (1765–1827). Before the Holocaust, followers of Ger were estimated to number in excess of 100,000, making it the largest and most influential Hasidic group in Poland.

As of 2024 the movement was based in Jerusalem and its membership is estimated at 15,000 families, most of whom live in Israel, making Ger the largest Hasidic dynasty in Israel. There are also well-established Ger communities in the United States and in Europe. In 2019, some 300 families of followers led by Shaul Alter, split off from the dynasty led by his cousin Yaakov Aryeh Alter.

== History ==
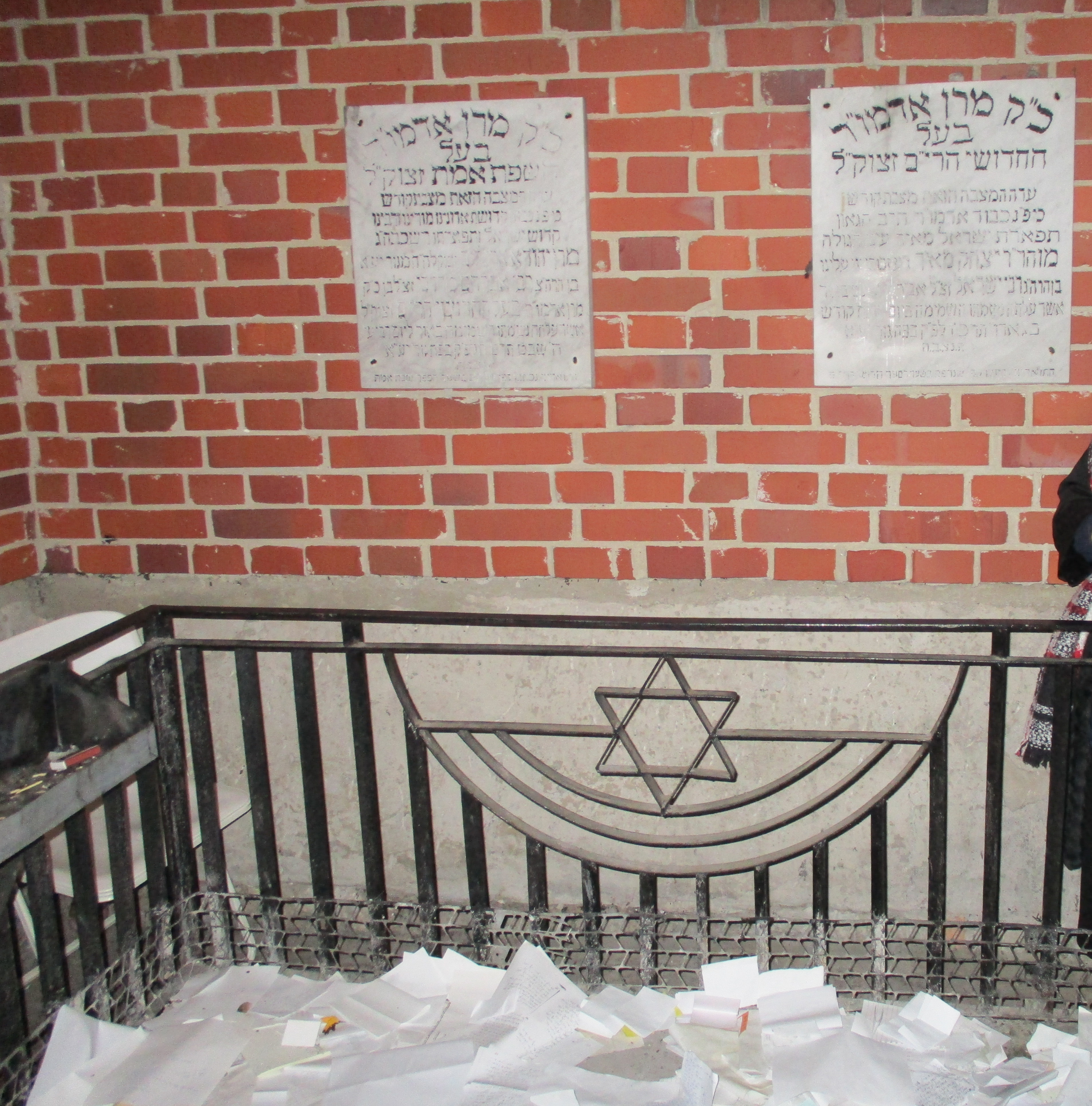
The graves of rabbis Yitzchak Meir Alter and Yehudah Aryeh Leib Alter in Góra Kalwaria, Poland.

In his early years, Yitzchak Meir Alter became a close disciple of Simcha Bunim of Peshischa, who preached the ideals of Talmudic rationalism and the pursuit of personal authenticity—later foundational tenets of Ger Hasidism. After Simcha Bunim died in 1827, Yitzchak Meir Alter was among his more radical supporters who followed Menachem Mendel of Kotzk (the Kotzker Rebbe) rather than Simcha Bunim's son, Avraham Moshe.

The Kotzker Rebbe continued in the ideological tradition of Peshischa, and after he died in 1859, most of his followers accepted Yitzchak Meir Alter as his successor rather than his son, Dovid. Yitzchak Meir Alter was living in Warsaw at the time and operated a Kotzker shtiebel (small congregation).

Shortly after accepting the role of Rebbe, Yitzchak Meir was appointed as the Av Beit Din of Góra Kalwaria (Yiddish: גער), where he established his own Hasidic court. After his death in 1866, his followers wanted his eighteen-year-old grandson, Yehudah Aryeh Leib Alter, to succeed him. When Yehuda Aryeh Leib refused to accept this position, most of the Hasidim became followers of the elderly Hasid Chanokh Heynekh HaKohen Levin, after whose death Yehudah Aryeh Leib acceded to the request of the Hasidim to become their next rebbe.

The Gerrer movement continued under the leadership of Yehudah Aryeh Leib and his eldest son and successor, Avraham Mordechai Alter, known as the "Imrei Emes".

In 1926, in an unusual move for Polish Hasidim, Avraham Mordechai established a yeshiva in Jerusalem, naming it for his father, the Sfas Emes. The first rosh yeshiva was Rabbi Nechemiah Alter, a brother of the Imrei Emes. The yeshiva is the flagship of the Ger yeshivas. Under the leadership of the fifth Gerrer Rebbe, Yisrael Alter, known as the "Beis Yisrael", the Ichud Mosdos Gur (or Union of Gerrer Institutions) was established as the responsible body for funding all the educational institutions affiliated with Ger in Israel. There are about 100 such institutions. The Beis Yisrael helped rebuild the Ger movement after its virtual destruction in World War II.

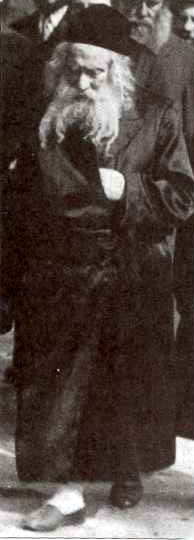
Rabbi Avraham Mordechai Alter in Europe

== Distribution of Gerrer Hasidim ==
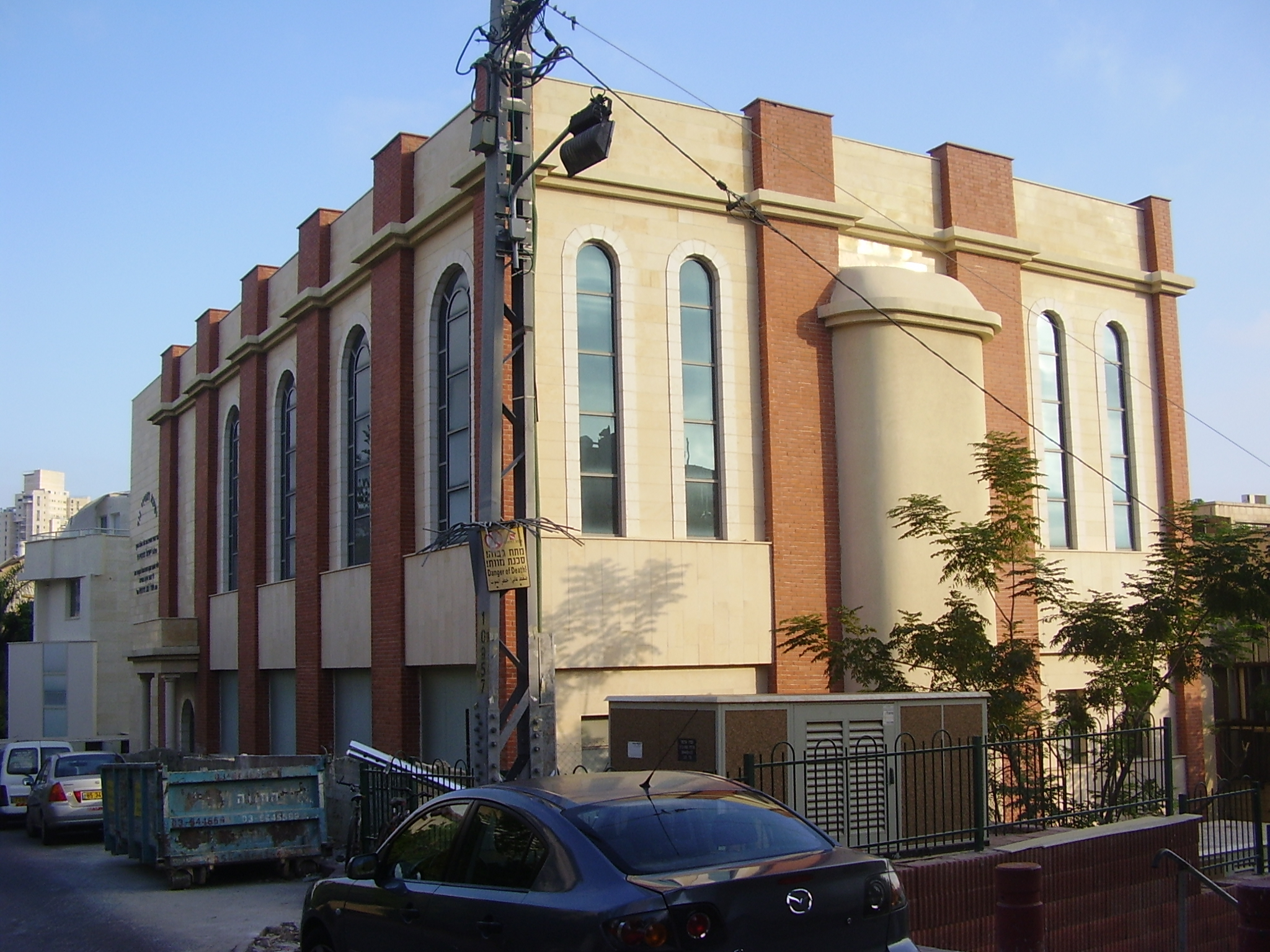
Gur Yeshiva in Har Shalom, Bnei Brak

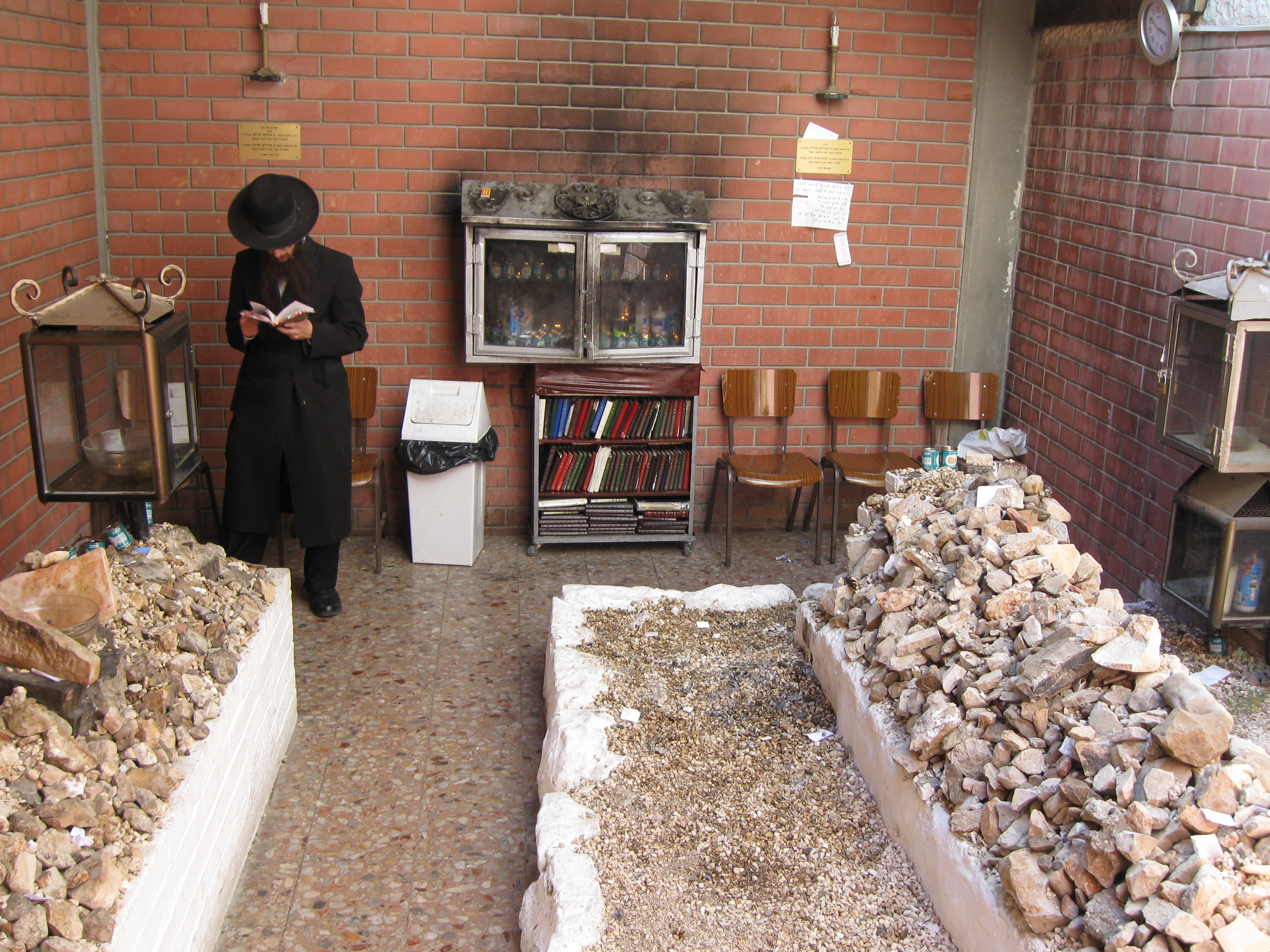
Graves of the Imrei Emes and his son Pinchas Menachem in Mea She'arim, Jerusalem

Almost all Ger Hasidim living in pre-war Europe (approximately 100,000 Hasidim) were murdered by the Nazis in the Holocaust. Avraham Mordechai Alter, who managed to escape, set about the task of rebuilding the movement in the British Mandate of Palestine. Under its post-war leaders, the movement began to flourish again. With approximately 12,000 families, Ger is the third-largest Hasidic dynasty in the world today, comprising 9.2% of the world population of Hasidim. Large communities of Gerrer Hasidim exist in Israel, in Bnei Brak (2294 families / 19% of the Hasidic population), Ashdod (2218 families / 45%), and Jerusalem (1921 families / 12%), and a slightly smaller community of 1,027 families (6% of the Hasidic population) exists in the Borough Park neighborhood of Brooklyn, New York.

Smaller communities with hundreds of families have also been established in Israel, such as Arad, Beit Shemesh, Kiryat Gat, Hatzor HaGlilit, Haifa, Dimona, Tel Aviv, and Petah Tikva. Internationally, hundreds of families reside in London, Antwerp, Zürich (where they are the largest Hasidic group), Manchester, Monsey, and Lakewood, with tens more living in Los Angeles, Queens, Montreal, Melbourne, and Chicago. Ger maintains a well-developed educational network of Talmud Torahs, yeshivas, and kollels, as well as Beis Yaakov schools for girls. The dynasty is the wealthiest in Israel, and its leaders dominate the Agudat Israel political party.

== Headquarters ==
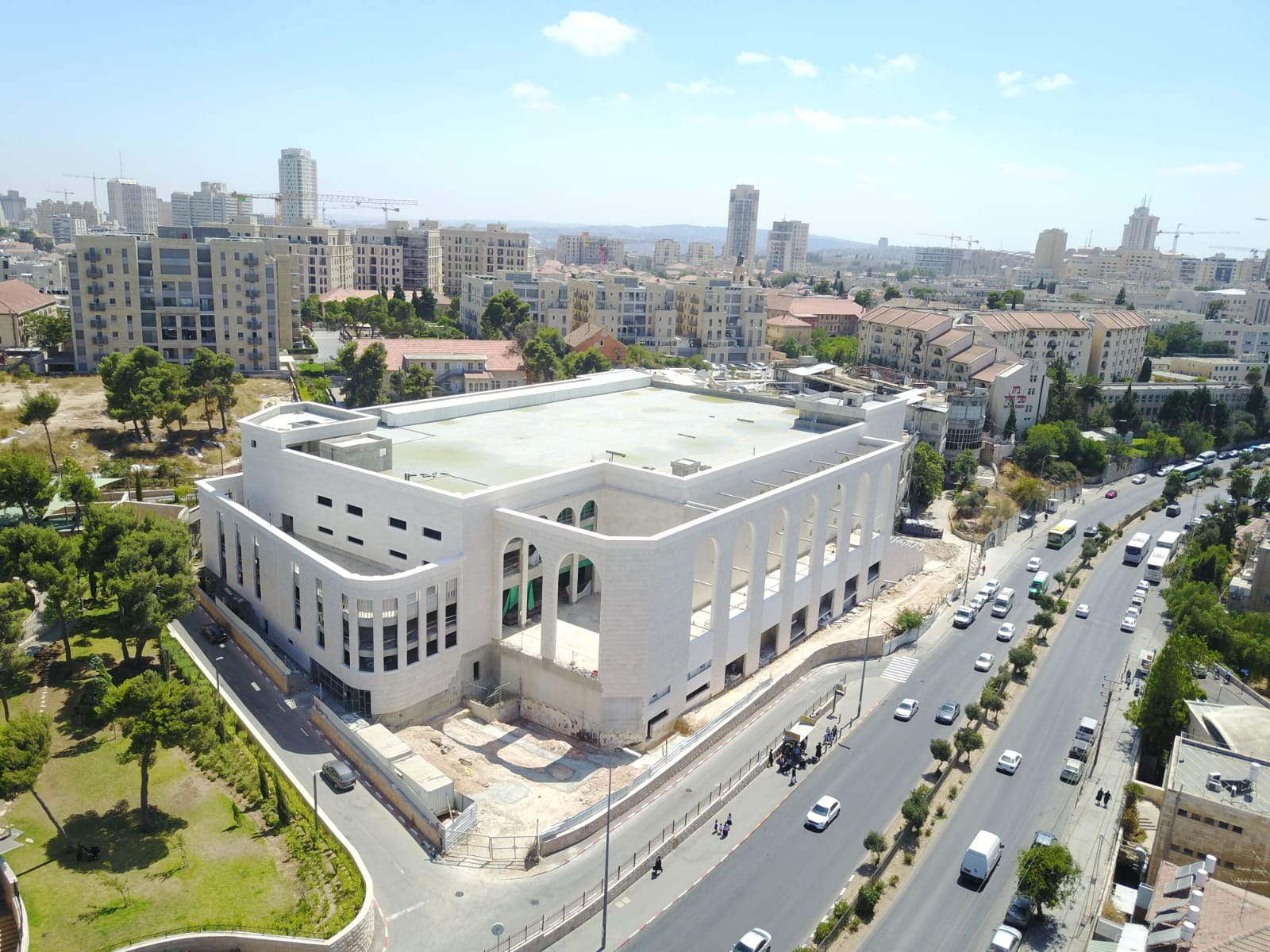
The Great Beth Midrash in Jerusalem

The group's headquarters is located in Jerusalem. During and after the British Mandate, the group's beth midrash was at the Sfas Emes Yeshiva, near Mahane Yehuda. Later on, the synagogue moved to Ralbach Street in the Geula neighborhood, and in the late 1990s, the Great Beth Midrash Gur was inaugurated on Yirmeyahu Street, near the Schneller Orphanage complex. In 2015, an extension to the building was begun, and on Rosh Hashanah 2018 (5779), the second wing of the Beth Medrash was inaugurated. In 2022, the building was finished when the two wings were joined, making it the largest synagogue in the world, with the main sanctuary seating up to 20,000, and having an area of approximately 35,000 m^{2} (380,000 sq ft).

== Historical Headquarters in Gora, Poland ==
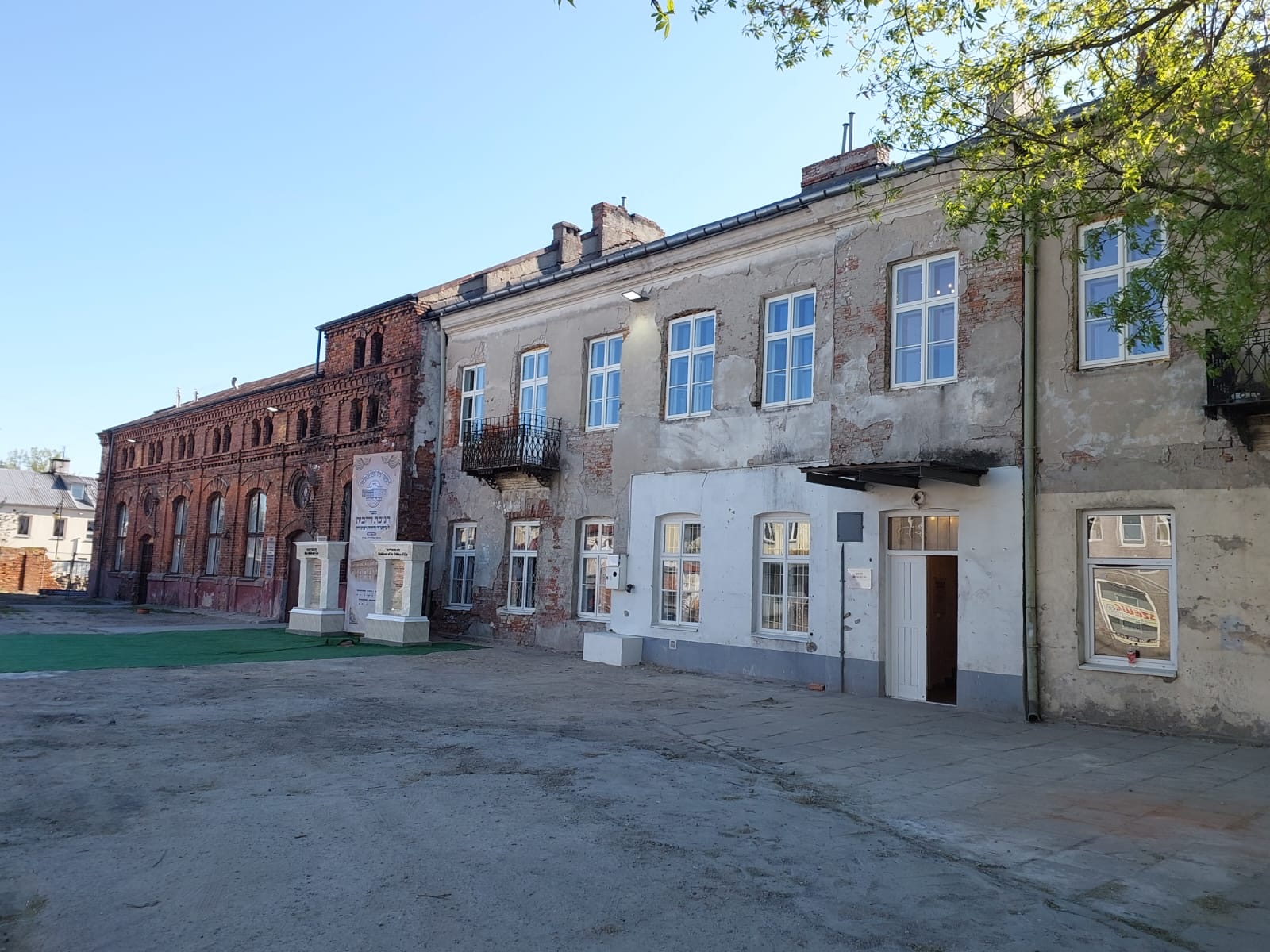
Exterior of the Historical Ger Bais Medrish in Góra Kalwaria, Poland

In April 2026, the historic Ger Beis Medrash in Góra Kalwaria, Poland, was formally rededicated following its restoration and the return of the property to the Ger Hasidic community.

The building had served as an important center of the Ger chasidus before World War II.

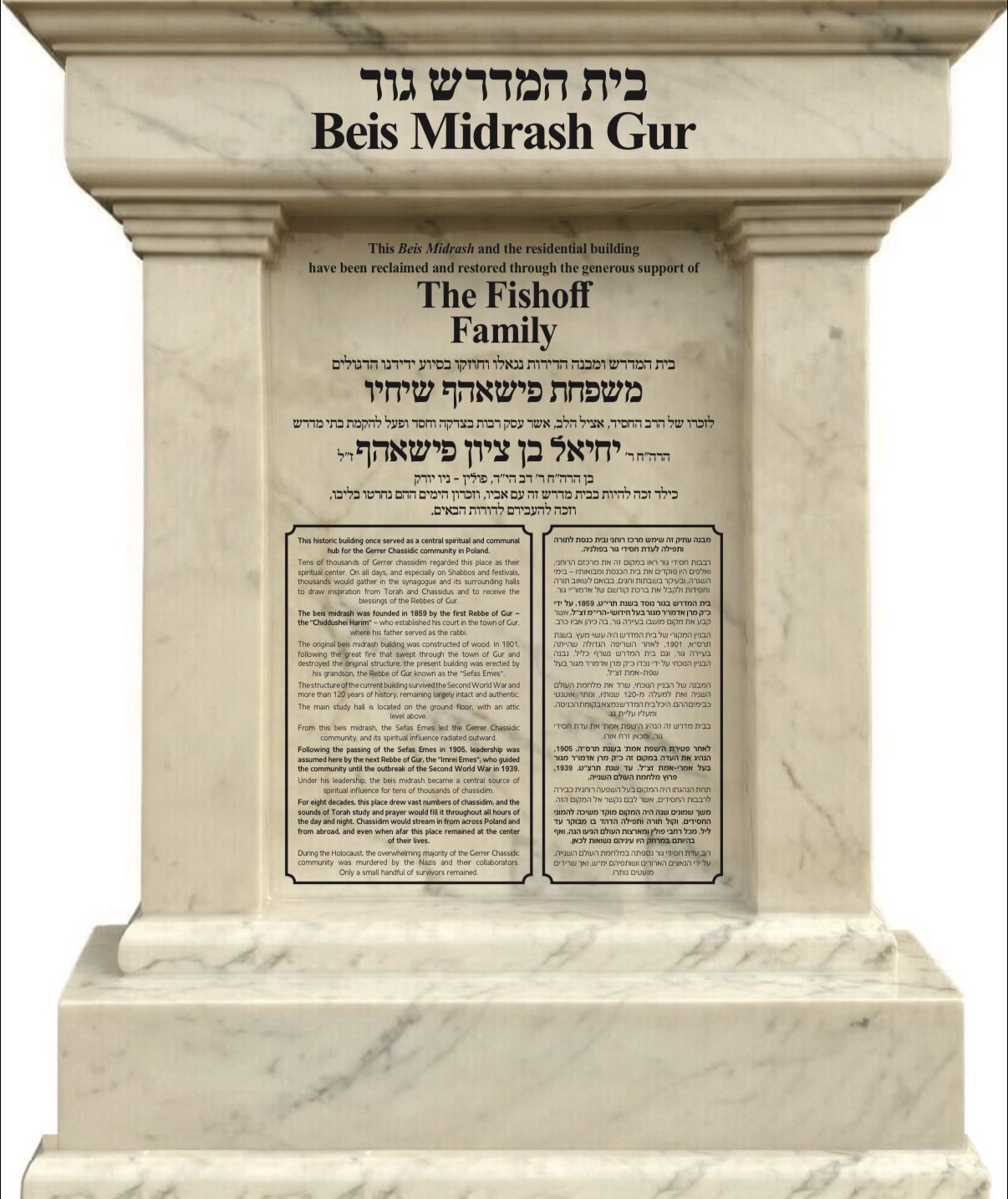
The Fishoff Family Dedication Plaque Outside The Historic Ger Bais Medrish in Góra Kalwaria, Poland

The restoration was sponsored by The Fishoff Family, and the Beis Medrash was dedicated in memory of their father, a Holocaust survivor and lifelong supporter or Ger, Yechiel Benzion “Benny” Fishoff.

== Identifying features of Ger ==
The men are distinguished by their dark Hasidic garb, and by their pants tucked into their socks, called hoyzn-zokn (not to be confused with the breeches, called halber-hoyzn, worn by men in some other Hasidic groups). They wear a round felt hat, and a high, almost-pointed kapel. They raise their sidelocks from the temples, and tuck them under the yarmulke, nearly hiding them. On Shabbos and Jewish holidays, married men wear the high circular fur hat of the Polish Hasidim, called a spodik by Galicianers (not to be confused with the much flatter shtreimel worn by married men in Hasidic groups which do not hail from Congress Poland). Gerrers however are not allowed to use real fur in their spodik, as it is considered extravagantly costly.

== Schism ==
In October 2019, a group of Gerrer Hasidim under the leadership of Shaul Alter split from the main hassidic court, forming a new kehilla: "Kehilas Pnei Menachem". The split, the first in Ger's history, followed two decades of repeated tensions between Alter, son of the former Gerrer Rebbe, and his cousin, the current one—tensions which only increased when the latter closed the prestigious yeshiva where Alter was Rosh Yeshiva in 2016, then failed to invite him to his grandson's wedding in 2019. On 22 October 2019, Alter held a public Sukkot event, where donations and school enrollment forms for the new group were passed out, marking the split.

On November 8, 2021, the Jerusalem Post reported that Kehilas Pnei Menachem numbers some 500 families in Israel, with another 300 in the USA, while the mainstream Gur community in Israel is thought to number as many as 100,000 people (the equivalent of 11,494 families, according to a November 2021 report by Israel's National Economic Council which averages 6.7 children per Haredi family).

In May 2022 violent clashes erupted between Hasidim of both communities in Ashdod, Bnei Brak and Jerusalem. Hundreds of men stormed Alter's yeshiva, and he had to be escorted home by police.

== Gerrer dynastic leadership ==
- Grand Rabbi Yitzchak Meir Alter (1798–1866), (the Chiddushei HaRim), first Gerrer Rebbe from 1859 to 1866.
  - Grand Rabbi Chanokh Heynekh HaKohen Levin (1798–1870), second Gerrer Rebbe from 1866 to 1870.
  - Rabbi Avraham Mordechai Alter (1815–1855).
    - Grand Rabbi Yehudah Aryeh Leib Alter (1847–1905), (the Sfas Emes), third Gerrer Rebbe from 1870 to 1905.
      - Grand Rabbi Avraham Mordechai Alter (1866–1948), (the Imrei Emes), fourth Gerrer Rebbe from 1905 to 1948.
        - Grand Rabbi Yisrael Alter (1895–1977), (the Beis Yisroel), fifth Gerrer Rebbe from 1948 to 1977.
        - Grand Rabbi Simchah Bunim Alter (1898–1992), (the Lev Simcha), sixth Gerrer Rebbe from 1977 to 1992.
          - Grand Rabbi Yaakov Aryeh Alter (born 1939), eighth Gerrer Rebbe from 1996 to present.
        - Grand Rabbi Pinchas Menachem Alter (1926–1996), (the Pnei Menachem), seventh Gerrer Rebbe from 1992 to 1996.
          - Rabbi Shaul Alter (born 1957), leader of Kehilas Pnei Menachem (an offshoot from the Ger Hasidic Dynasty) from 2019 to present.

== Notable people ==
- Yankel Talmud (1885–1965), composer of Jewish liturgical music.

== See also ==
- List of Hasidic dynasties
- Hasidic Judaism in Poland
