= Pinchas Menachem Alter =

Rebbe of the Ger Hasidic dynasty

Pinchas Menachem Alter פינחס מנחם אלתר
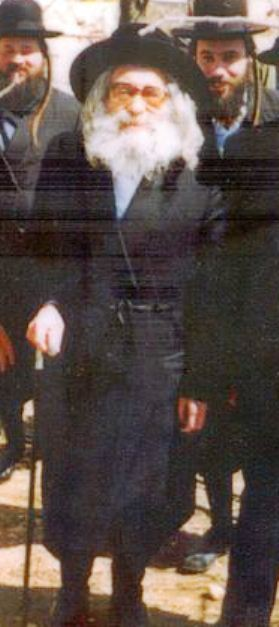
- Title: Gerrer Rebbe

Personal life
- Born: June 9, 1926 Falenica near Warsaw, Poland
- Died: March 7, 1996 (aged 69) Jerusalem
- Buried: 7 March 1996; Sfas Emes Yeshiva, Jerusalem
- Spouse: Tzipora Alter
- Children: Esther Lipl; Moshe Betzalel Alter; Shaul Alter; Yehuda Aryeh Leyb Alter; Yitzchak Dovid Alter; Yaakov Meir Alter; Daniel Chaim Alter
- Parent(s): Avraham Mordechai Alter; Feyge Mintshe Biderman
- Dynasty: Ger

Religious life
- Religion: Judaism

Jewish leader
- Predecessor: Simcha Bunim Alter
- Successor: Yaakov Aryeh Alter
- Began: 7 July 1992
- Ended: 7 March 1996
- Dynasty: Ger

Pinchas Menachem Alter (Hebrew: פינחס מנחם אלתר; July 3, 1926 – March 7, 1996), also known as the Pnei Menachem (פני מנחם), after the works he authored, was the sixth rebbe of the Hasidic dynasty of Ger, a position he held from 1992 until his death in 1996. From 1956 until he was appointed rebbe, he was a Rosh Yeshiva (dean of a yeshiva). He also served as a member and the president of the Torah Scholars Council and as the chairman of the Agudat Yisrael political party.

== Early years ==
Alter was born in Falenica, near Warsaw, Poland. He was the only child of Rabbi Avraham Mordechai Alter, the fourth rebbe of Ger, and his second wife, Feyge Mintshe Biderman. Alter had four half-brothers and two half-sisters from his father's first marriage—including the fifth rebbe of Ger, Yisrael Alter, and Simcha Bunim Alter, the sixth rebbe of Ger.

After World War II he married his cousin Tzipora Alter. In 1956, he was appointed rosh yeshiva of Sfas Emes, the flagship yeshiva of Ger in Jerusalem, Israel.

== Succession as rebbe ==
Alter succeeded his half-brother, Simcha Bunim Alter, as rebbe in 1992. His position as rosh yeshiva of Sfas Emes Yeshiva was assumed by his son, Shaul Alter.

As rebbe he continued the policies of his half-brothers Simcha Bunim and Yisrael by supporting the Agudat Israel of Israel political party, promoting Haredi Judaism in the Israeli Knesset (parliament). He reached an accommodation with non-Hasidic Ashkenazi Haredi rabbis, in particular with Elazar Shach, leader of the rival Degel HaTorah party. Together, they created the United Torah Judaism (Yahadut HaTorah) party in order not to lose residual votes in the Israeli proportional representation system, and thereby potentially obtain an extra seat for the newly united party in Knesset elections.

== Death and burial ==
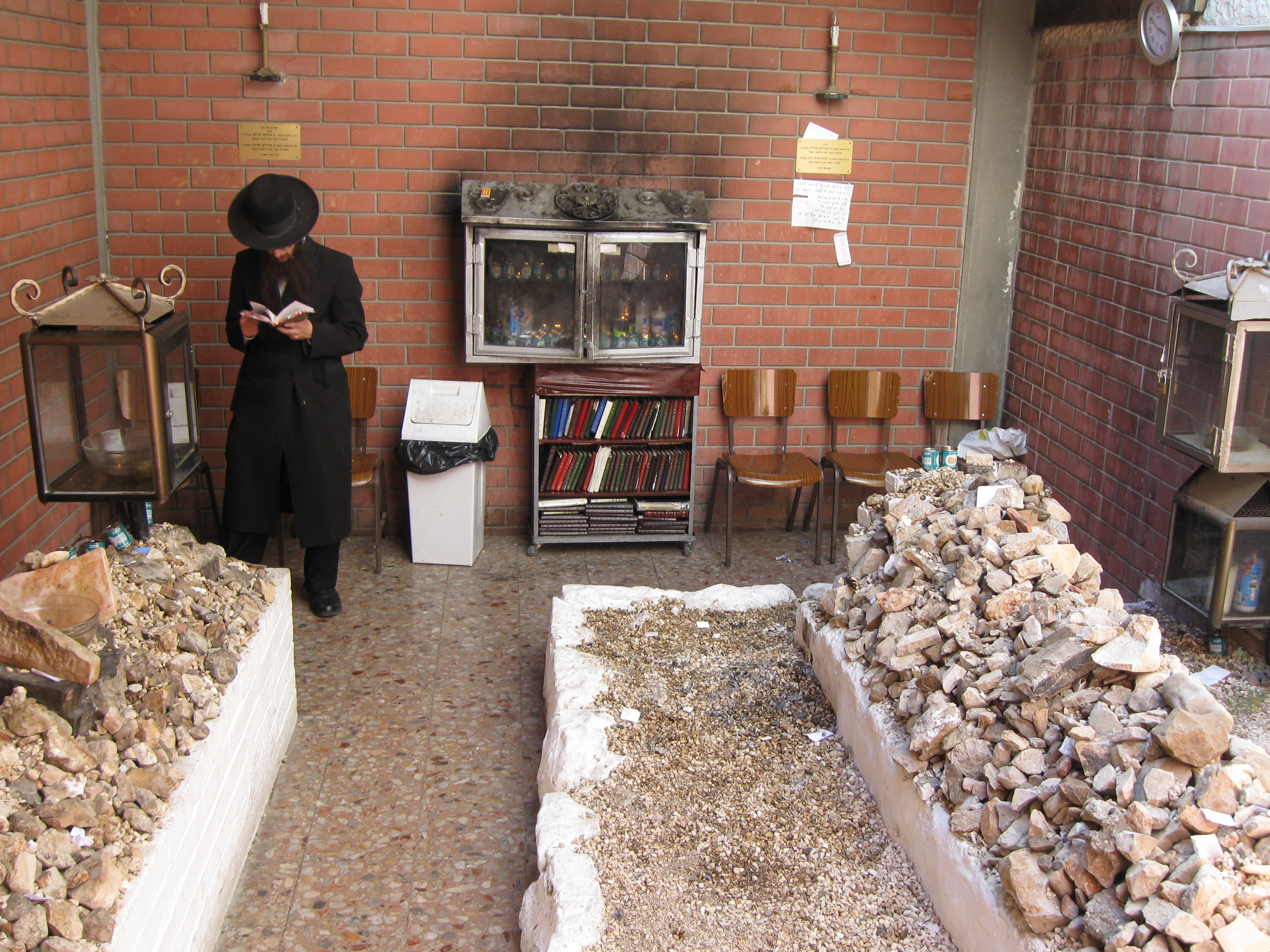
Graves of Alter (left) and his father, with visitation stones

Alter died in 1996 and was buried beside his father in the courtyard of the Sfas Emes Yeshiva. Unlike his father's grave, which was dug by hand under the cover of darkness during the British curfew in 1948, his grave was dug with machinery and is therefore lower than his father's. A red-brick ohel (tomb) was built over the two graves, which are visited frequently by students in the yeshiva.

He was succeeded as rebbe by his nephew, Yaakov Aryeh Alter, son of Simcha Bunim Alter.

In 2019 his son Shaul Alter formed his own followership of Ger Chasidim called Kehilas Pnei Menachem which is independent of the greater Ger sect.
