= Avraham Mordechai Alter =

Fourth Rebbe of Ger (1865–1948)

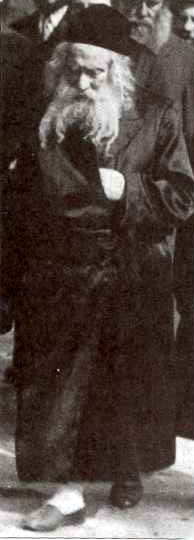
- Title: Gerrer Rebbe

Personal life
- Born: Avraham Mordechai Alter; 25 December 1865 Góra Kalwaria, Poland
- Died: 13 June 1948 (aged 82) Jerusalem, Israel
- Buried: Sfas Emes Yeshiva, Jerusalem
- Spouse: Chaya Ruda Czarna, Feyge Mintshe Biderman
- Children: Meir Alter; Yitzchak Alter; Feyge Alter; Esther Alter; Yisrael Alter; Simcha Bunim Alter, Pinchas Menachem Alter
- Parents: Yehudah Aryeh Leib Alter (father); Yocheved Rivka Kaminer (mother)
- Dynasty: Ger

Religious life
- Religion: Judaism

Jewish leader
- Predecessor: Yehudah Aryeh Leib Alter
- Successor: Yisrael Alter
- Began: 1905
- Ended: 3 June 1948
- Main work: Imrei Emes
- Dynasty: Ger

Avraham Mordechai Alter (Polish: Abraham Mordechaj Alter, Yiddish: אברהם מורדכא אַלטער, Hebrew: אברהם מרדכי אלתר; 25 December 1865 – 13 June 1948), was also known as the Imrei Emes after the works he wrote. He was third Rebbe of the Hasidic dynasty of Ger. The Ger Rebbe, from 1905 until his death in 1948. A participant in the foundation of the Agudas Israel in Poland. Rebbe Alter was influential in establishing a network of Jewish schools. He led over two-hundred-thousand Hasidim.

== Personal life ==
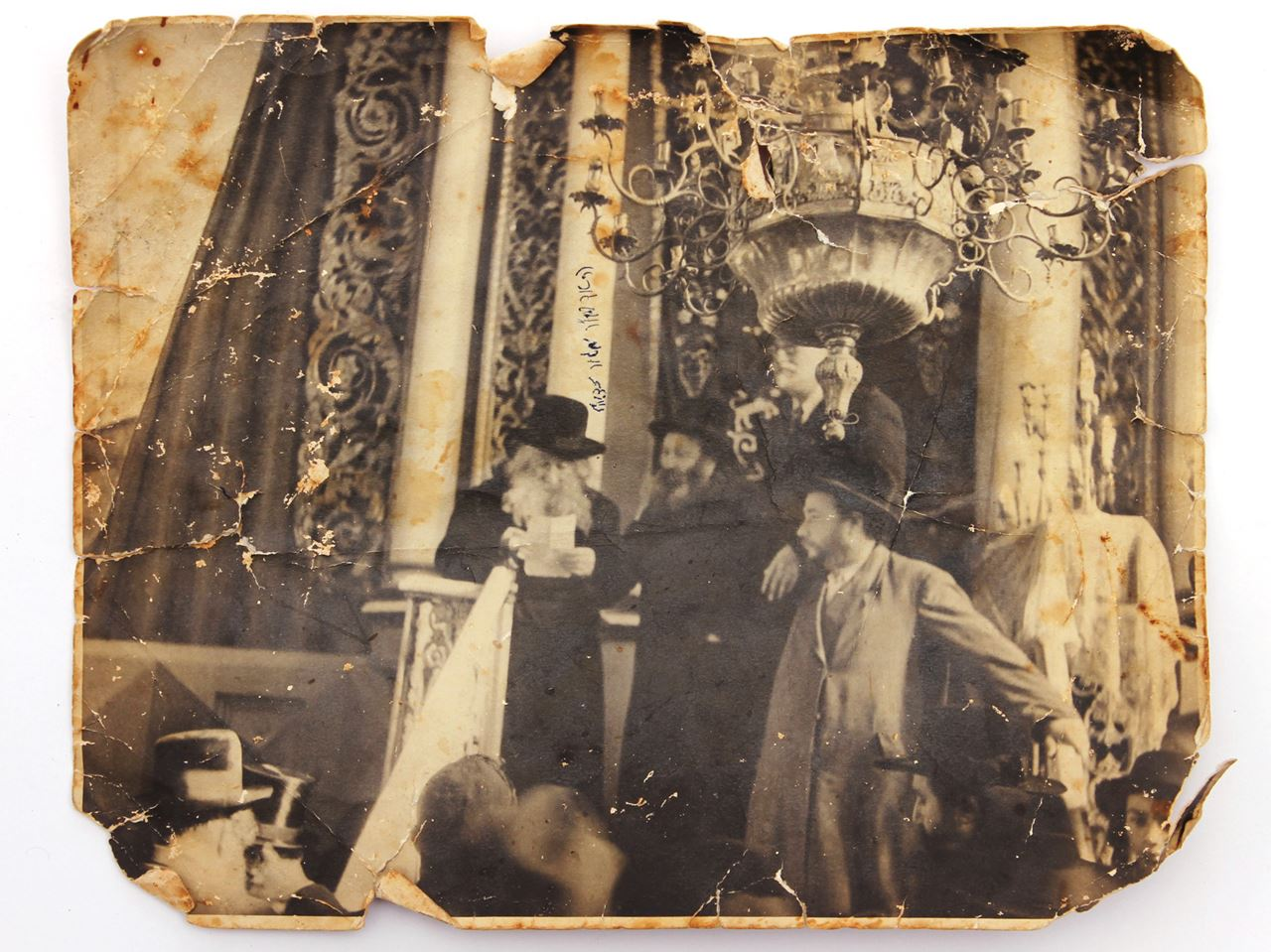
Gerrer Rebbe at the Hurva Synagogue in Jerusalem, with the horrific news of the murder of millions of Jews from Poland and Europe, November 1942. Next to him is his son Pinchas Menachem

Rebbe Alter married his first wife, Chaya Ruda Czarna. Rebbe Alter and his first wife had eight children. She was daughter of Noah Czarny, a prominent Gerrer Hasid in Biala. Rabbi Meir Alter, was a Torah scholar and businessman, the eldest son. The second son was Rabbi Yitzchak Alter. The second son, died in 1934 in Poland. Rabbi Meir, the eldest, was murdered in Treblinka, along with all of his offspring and their children, all perished. This was during the Holocaust.

In 1922, Rebbe Alter's wife Chaya Ruda died. Feyge Mintshe Biderman was his next wife, who also was his niece. By 1926 the youngest child, Pinchas Menachem Alter, was born.

In 1924, Rebbe Alter accompanied the Moetzes Gedolei HaTorah delegation which visited Palestine. It included Rabbi Hirsh Heynekh Lewin, who was his brother in-law, Yitzhak-Meir Levin who also was his son-in-law, along with the Sokolover Rebbe Yitzchak Zelig Morgenstern, and several other distinguished rabbis and rebbes. They visited Jerusalem, Safed, Hebron, Tiberias and Tel Aviv. This was a more than six week visit.

== World War II ==
During World War II, Rebbe Alter was targeted by the Nazi authorities in occupied Poland. In 1940, he managed to escape Nazi-occupied Poland. Rebbe Alter made it to Palestine with several of his sons. He rebuilt the Ger Hasidic dynasty in Palestine. This became the Sfas Emes Yeshiva, and he remained from 1940 until his death in 1948.

== Death and legacy ==
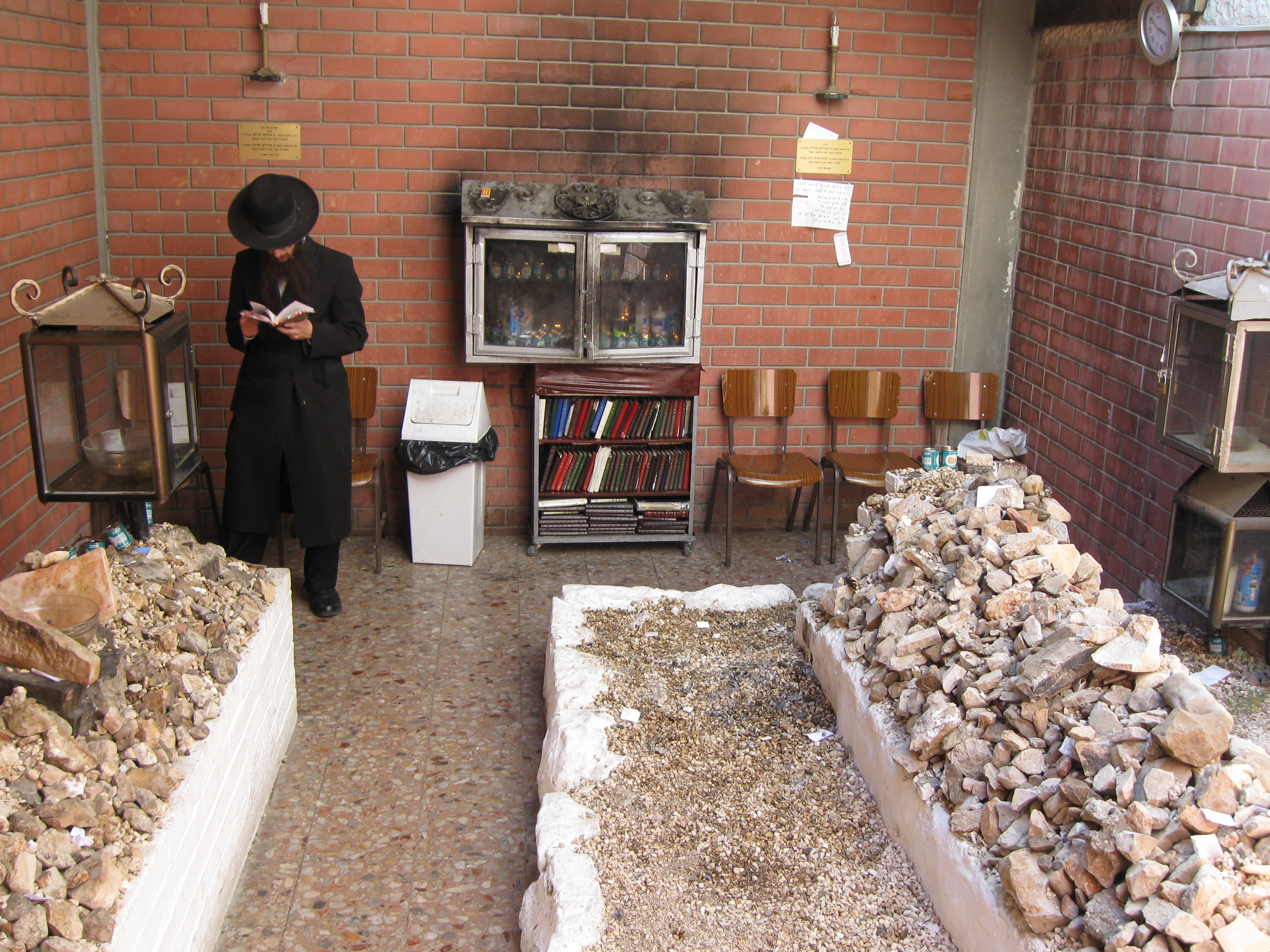
Graves of Grand Rabbi Avraham Mordechai Alter (right) and his son, Grand Rabbi Pinchas Menachem Alter (left) in an ohel adjacent to Sfas Emes Yeshiva in Mea Shearim, Jerusalem

With the outbreak of the 1948 Arab-Israeli War, Alter was trapped in Jerusalem. He died during the holiday of Shavuot of natural causes during the siege of the city by the Jordanian Arab Legion. As bodies could not be removed to the Mount of Olives during wartime, he was buried in the yeshiva courtyard on the condition that he would be reburied elsewhere after the war. However, his sons and successors, the Beis Yisrael and Lev Simcha, declined to go through with the reburial.

After Alter's death, the dynasty continued with his three remaining sons, who became the consecutive next three heads of the Gerrer Hasidim worldwide: Rabbi Yisrael Alter (fifth rebbe of Ger); Rabbi Simchah Bunim Alter (sixth rebbe of Ger); and Rabbi Pinchas Menachem Alter (seventh rebbe of Ger). In 1996, Rabbi Pinchas Menachem Alter was buried next to his father in the courtyard and a red-brick ohel was placed over both graves, which are visited regularly by students in the adjoining yeshiva.

The Hebrew acronym for Rabbi Avraham Mordechai is "Re'em (Hebrew: רְאֵ"ם). A religious moshav in central Israel is named for the Rebbe, Bnei Re'em, (lit. Sons of Re'em) as well as the nearby junction of highway 40 and highway 3.

== Sources ==
Levin, Yehuda Leib (1977). The Rebbes of Gur: The History of Their Lives and Work (in Hebrew). Jerusalem: Ha-Modia.
