= Justman =

Justman is a surname. Notable people with the surname include:

- Chanoch Gad Justman (1883–1942), Polish Hasidic Rabbi
- Pinchas Menachem Justman (1848–1910), Polish Hasidic Rabbe
- Robert H. Justman (1926–2008), American television producer, director and production manager
- Seth Justman (born 1951), American keyboard player
- Zuzana Justman (born 1931), Czech documentary filmmaker and writer

== See also ==
- Mount Justman, mountain of Antarctica
