= Pilica, Silesian Voivodeship =

Town in Silesian Voivodeship, Poland

Pilica
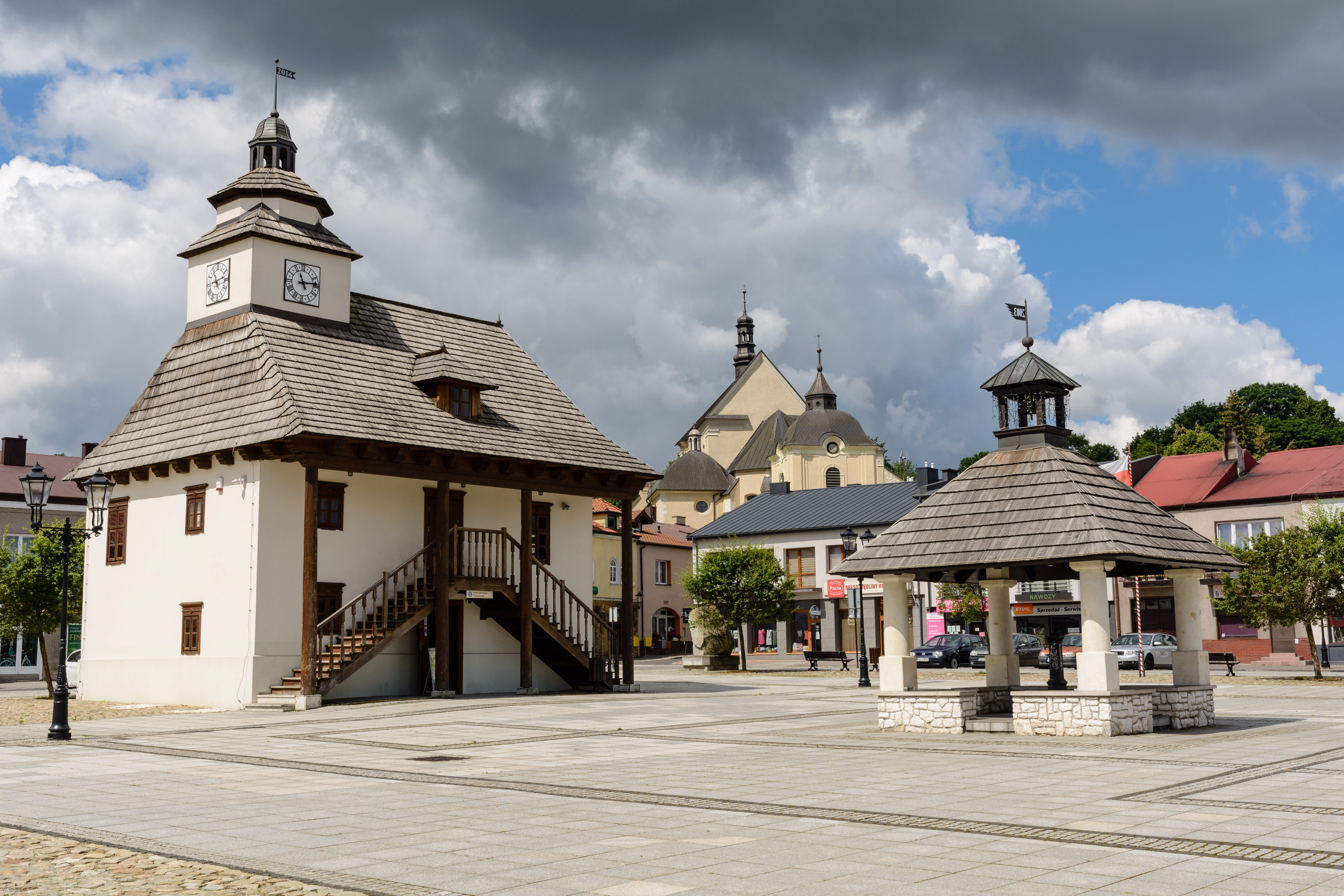
- Rynek (Market Square)

- Coat of arms

- Location within Poland
- Coordinates: 50°27′59″N 19°39′24″E
- Country: Poland
- Voivodeship: Silesian
- County: Zawiercie
- Gmina: Pilica
- Town rights: about 1393

Government
  - Mayor: Artur Janosik (PSL)

Area
  - Total: 8.22 km^{2} (3.17 sq mi)

Population (2019-06-30)
  - Total: 1,936
  - Density: 236/km^{2} (610/sq mi)
- Time zone: UTC+1 (CET)
  - Summer (DST): UTC+2 (CEST)
- Postal code: 42-436
- Car plates: SZA
- Website: www.pilica.pl

Pilica (Polish pronunciation: [piˈlit͡sa]) is a town in Zawiercie County, Silesian Voivodeship, in southern Poland, with 1,936 inhabitants (2019).

== History ==
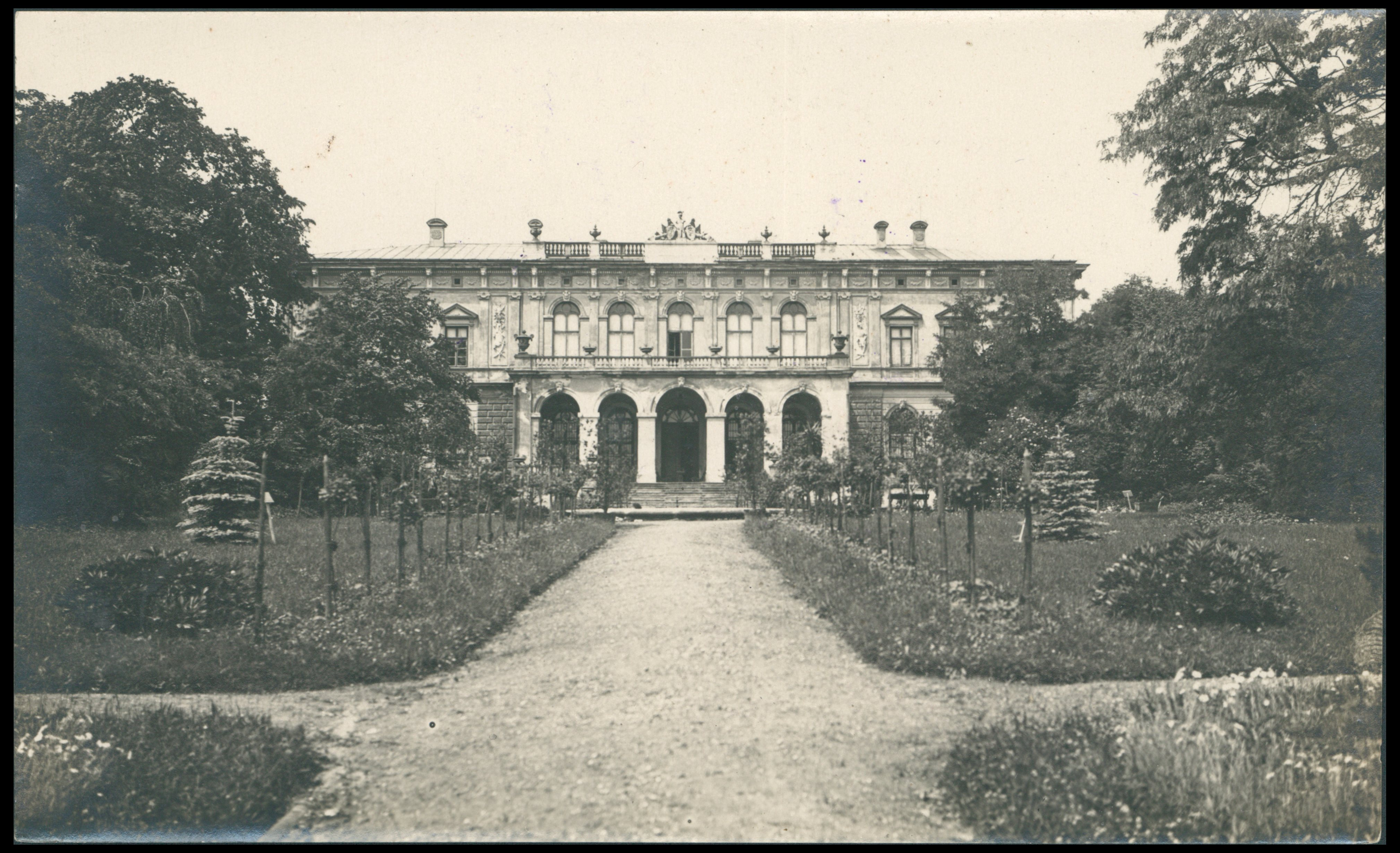
Pilica Palace in the 1920s

Since the beginning of its existence, Pilica was part of the historic Lesser Poland region. In accordance with the testament of Duke Bolesław III Wrymouth (1138), it became part of the Seniorate Province. The town rights were granted in around 1393.

After 1815, it was located in the Russian Partition of Poland. Several years after the January Uprising, Pilica lost its town privileges under the Tsar's ukase from June 1, 1869. After World War I, in 1918, Poland regained independence and control of Pilica.

Following the German-Soviet invasion of Poland, which started World War II in September 1939, it was occupied by Germany until 1945. The Polish resistance movement was active in Pilica, including a local unit of the Home Army under the cryptonym "Powój". On 5 October 1943, the Peasant Battalions rescued their partisans from German captivity in Pilica. In November 1944, the Polish resistance took control of local agricultural warehouses, seizing their supplies from the Germans as part of a nationwide effort to prevent the Germans from shipping food out of Poland.

Town rights were restored in 1994.

== Jewish community ==
Jews are first mentioned in Pilica in 1581, when they are accused of insulting the host. The historian Meier Balaban notes in his book The History of the Jews of Kraków and Kazimierz 1304–1868 (in Polish): “In the 16th Century the Jewish Kehilla of Krakow was subdivided into seven regional districts: Olkusz, Chrzanow, Wisnicz, Sacz, Bobowa, Pilica, Bedzin, Oshpitzin, and Wolbrom.”

Rabbi Pinchas Eliyahu Rotenberg, the nephew of Rabbi Yitzchak Meir Alter of Gur, was rabbi of the town until his death in 1903.

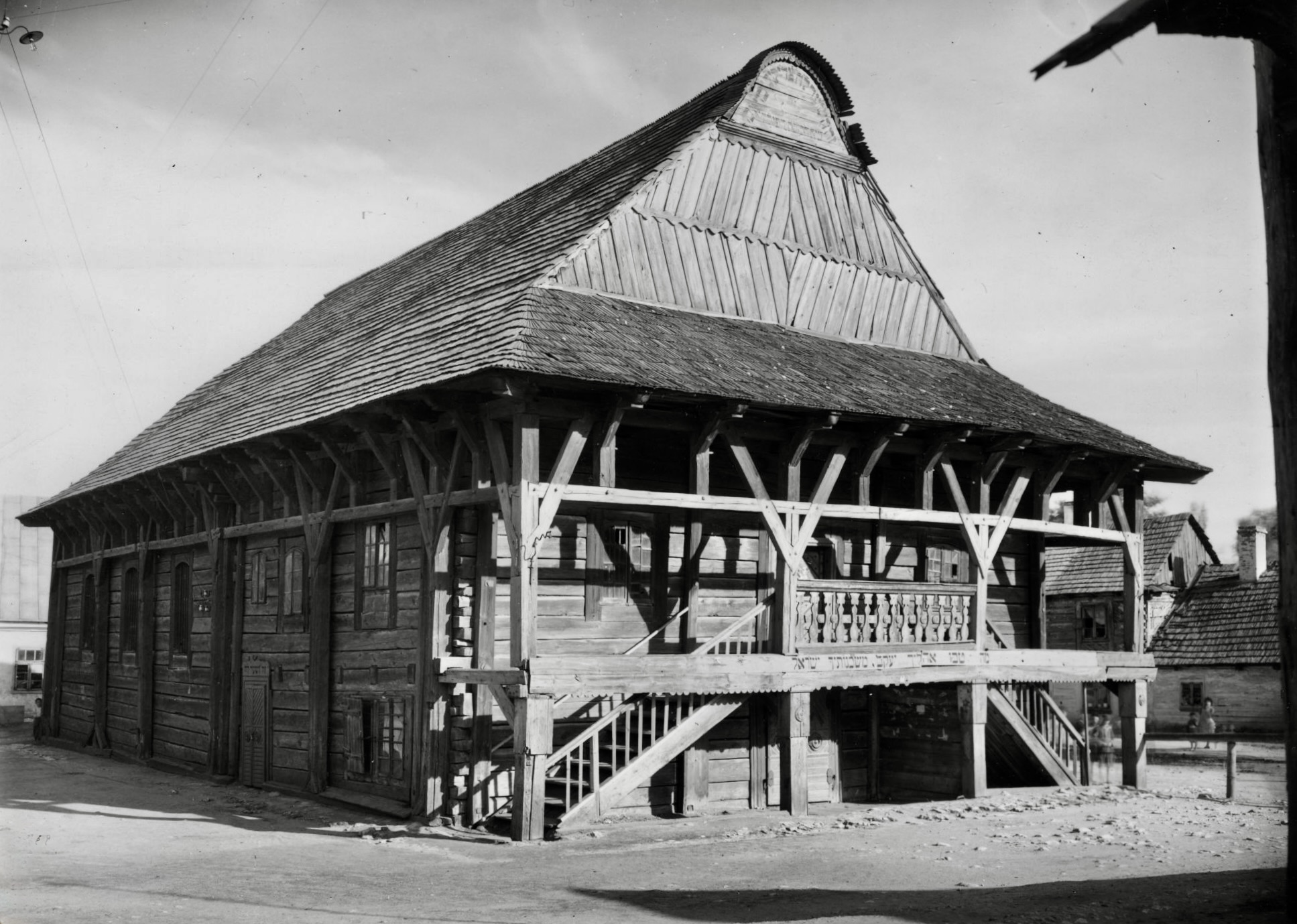
Synagogue in the 1930s

In 1905 Pilica became a famous centre of Hasidism. After a famous tzaddik from Góra Kalwaria died – Rabbi Yehudah Aryeh Leib Alter – a considerable number of Hasidim started to go on pilgrimages to the rabbi's brother-in-law, Rabbi Pinchas Menachem Justman author of Siftei Tzadik. The latter, on the other hand, was Pilica's rabbi.

By 1921, the majority of the town's residents were Jewish, with a Jewish population of 1,877 compared to a population of 3,299 overall. The town was occupied by the German army in September 1939. 2,000 Jews were kept imprisoned in a ghetto. In 1942, all the Jews were firstly transferred to the Wolbrom ghetto and then to the concentration camps. Today, no Jews live in Pilica.
