= Pinchas Menachem Justman =

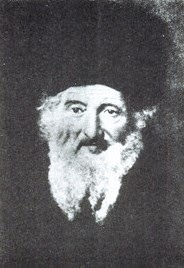
- Portrait of Rabbi Pinchas Menachem Justman, The Piltzer Rebbe.

Personal life
- Born: 1848 Góra Kalwaria, Poland
- Died: 1920 (aged 71–72) Częstochowa, Poland

Religious life
- Religion: Judaism

Pinchas Menachem (Elazar) Justman (1848–1920) The Piltzer Rebbe, also known by the title of his main work, the Siftei Tzadik was a Hasidic Rabbi who after the passing of his brother-in-law Rabbi Yehudah Aryeh Leib Alter, became a Rebbe for some Gerrer Hasidim, in Pilica, Poland.

== Early years ==
He was born in Góra Kalwaria in 1848 to his father Rabbi Binyamin Leizer Justman and mother Tzina Pesa Justman (née Alter), daughter of the Chiddushei Harim the first Gerrer Rebbe, and named Pinchas Menachem. He was known to family and friends as Reb Mendele of Ger. His mother, Mrs. Tzina Pesa, died when Pinchas Menachem was young. Orphaned of his mother, he was brought up by his grandparents, Rabbi Yitzchak Meir Alter (known as the Chiddushei Harim) and his wife. When he was about nine years old, his grandfather took him to visit the Kotzker Rebbe, an event which left a lifelong impression on him. He married Hendel Lea, daughter of his uncle Abraham Mordechai Alter, in 1864.

Justman published the fifth printed edition of the Jerusalem Talmud, at Piotrkow from 1899 to 1903, with the commentary of Rabbi Yaakov Dovid Wilovsky (Ridbaz).

== Leadership ==
In 1905 when his brother-in-law, the second Gerrer rebbe—Rabbi Yehudah Aryeh Leib Alter died, some of the Hasidim sought to bestow the mantle of leadership upon him. He moved out of Gora Kalwaria to Pilica or Piltz as it was known by the Hasidim and become their Rebbe. He added the name Elazar to his name Pinchas Menachem when he was very ill, on 23 Tammuz 5672 (8 July 1912). Eventually he recovered from his illness. In 1915 he moved to Wieruszów and four years later he moved to Częstochowa.

== Death and burial ==
He died on Shabbat 10th of Kislev 5681 (21 November 1920) in Częstochowa. His funeral was held on Monday because of a disagreement between the Community of Pilz and the Community of Częstochowa regarding the burial place. Eventually he was buried in the Jewish cemetery of Częstochowa, next to his son Yitzchak Meir who died a year earlier. The sixth Rebbe of Ger was named Pinchas Menachem by his father Rabbi Avraham Mordechai Alter—after his beloved uncle Rabbi Pinchas Menachem Justman.

He wrote a commentary on Torah, called Sifsei Tzadik, which was published after his death by his son Rabbi Enoch Gad Justman and Rabbi Menachem Mendel Alter of Pabianice, son of the Sfas Emes. A new annotated edition was published in 2026. His commentary on the Talmud and Psalms disappeared at some point during the Holocaust.

== Family ==
Justman’s first wife Hendel Leah (Alter), gave birth to six daughters and three sons.

Esther - married to Rabbi Avraham Abba Bomatz

Chaya Sarah - married to Rabbi Yitzchak Meir Mintz

Bracha - married to Rabbi Yitzchak Meir Eibeszic

Rabbi Isaac Mayer Justman - married Rachel Araten. He served as Rabbi in Częstochowa (died 1920)

Feige - married to Rabbi Hanoch Henich Rotblat

Rabbi Avraham Mordechai Justman - married Rachel (died 1928)

Freida-Ratzh - married to Rabbi Meir Yoskovitz

Rachel - first marriage married to Rabbi Dov Berish Einhorn of Amstov. Second marriage to Rabbi Yehezkel Biderman

The youngest son and most famous, Rabbi Chanoch Gad Justman - married Devora Matill Halperin. He succeeded his father as Rabbi of Piltz. He later became the Rabbi of Wieluń. He was murdered in Treblinka (died 1942).

His second wife Chaya Yuta (Rothenberg), had no children from him.
