= History of the Jews in Wieluń =

Wieluń, Poland is a small town (population in 2006: about 24,400 inhabitants) situated in the south of central Poland, between the large cities of Łódź and Kraków. A Jewish presence in Wieluń was recorded from the early part of the 16th century (1537). Before World War II (1939–1945), Wielun had a large Jewish community (almost half of the local population), which was completely destroyed by the Nazis between 1940 and 1944.

The main source regarding the history of Wieluń's Jewish community is the memorial book of Wielun.

== Memorial Book of Wielun ==
The book was published in Tel Aviv in 1971 by the Wielun Association in Tel Aviv, Israel, which still exists, together with the Memorial Book Committee in the United States. Apart from a lengthy introduction in English, which includes a brief history of the town's Jewish community, the book is in Yiddish and in Hebrew.

In the English translation from Yiddish of the foreword, in the opening sentence, Moyshe Mendlevitsh spells out the purpose of the memorial book: "The Wielun Memorial Book constitutes the only remembrance of our former home, which was so brutally and ruthlessly eradicated. The town of Wielun still stands, but its Jewish inhabitants can no longer be found, as they all met with a tragic end. No single breath of Jewish life remains."

M Mendlevitsh continues: "Our Memorial Book attempts to reconstruct fleeting moments, occurrences, experiences, and recreate the figures and types of the past, so that nothing may ever be forgotten; to depict the everyday life of our ruined home-town: the days of sorrow, the days of joy and the hope for a better tomorrow."

M Mendlevitsh stresses the fact that Wielun was known to Jews as Wilojn or Wilohn — the latter being the preferred spelling in all "official Jewish community documents and records". Despite entrenched hostility on the part of the Poles, which M Mendlevitsh mentions, the Jewish community thrived and its members "always took pride in their place of birth". Indeed, "Wielun is a Crown" was a popular Jewish saying.

The town of Wielun was clean and prosperous by pre-war Polish standards, and Wielun's Jewish community was known to be well educated. The synagogue (built between 1830 and 1840) was the focal point of Jewish life in Wielun.

== Overview of the history of Wielun ==
In "Details about the history of Wielun", an overview of Wielun's history is given: "Wielun had been founded by Wladisław Adawicz at the end of the 12th century [AD]. The town has always been disputed territory among the ruling powers and has been burnt down several times. It was rebuilt by King Casimir the Great, who surrounded the town with a protective wall and co-opted it into the realm of the Polish Crown. During the times when the Jagellonians were ruling, the town flourished greatly. However, around the year 1858 [as had previously happened] during the Swedish invasion, it was burnt down again. Finally, during the time of the division of Poland [a reference, here, to the partitions], the town came under Russian occupation."

The author continues: "After the First World War, Wielun became a provincial town within a free, independent Poland and belonged to the province of Łódź*; [Wielun was then] about 14 kilometres from the Polish-German border. Wielun had 16,000 inhabitants, 40% of whom were Jews."

== Key dates in the history of Wielun's Jewish community ==
Early 17th century: There are no longer any Jews among the permanent inhabitants of Wielun, further to the efforts to evict all Jews by local Polish residents

1712: The Jewish revival in Wielun (in the course of the 18th century) leads to the appointment of the first rabbi, Rabbi Yeoshua Hashil. By the late 18th century, Wielun has about 1,000 Jewish inhabitants.

1841: There are over 500 Jewish families in Wielun; a synagogue, made of masonry, has been successfully completed.

1850s: Previously Jews buried their dead in the cemetery of Działoszyn. In the early 1850s a local cemetery was acquired due to an epidemic of cholera.

1894: The position of rabbi in Wielun becomes vacant and Rabbi Menachem Greenberg is appointed; he is Chief Rabbi of Wielun until his death in 1931.

1913: The Pontnev tragedy is widely reported across Poland: a Jewish family is murdered by a Polish mob near Wielun.

1931: The position of rabbi in Wielun becomes vacant and Rabbi Chanoch Gad Justman is appointed; he is Chief Rabbi of Wielun until WW2.

1939: On 1 September, at 5:30 am (local time), Wielun is the first town in Poland to be attacked by the German air force, with 80% of the town destroyed; 1,200 people die and 400 are injured. The destruction of the synagogue is completed by the Germans as part of the town's subsequent occupation. Rabbi Henoch Gad Justman decided to flee with his family and remaining community.

1940 (December): There are 4,050 Jews in Wielun (including 450 refugees from other parts of the country/district).

1942: The remaining Jews of Wielun are deported to the Nazi extermination camp of Chelmno: the end of 1942 coincides with the end of Wielun's Jewish community, as such.

A succinct English language description of the war years, based on original German and survivor sources, can be found in Yad Vashem's Encyclopedia of Camps and Ghettos.

1945: A small group of Jews (up to 100) try to re-establish a Jewish community in Wielun. However, in the face of open — and sometimes violent — hostility on the part of the local Poles (according to detailed accounts in the Memorial Book), they soon leave the town, never to return.

There has been no Jewish community in Wielun since 1945. Descendants of the Jews of Wielun can be found in North America, in Western Europe, and in Israel, among other parts of the world. There is an active Wielun Association in Tel Aviv (Israel) and there is also one in the United States.

== Population of Wielun in the 18th, 19th and 20th centuries ==
The Memorial Book gives the following estimates for the population of Wielun and its Jewish community.

- 1791 Overall population, 1,107
  - Jews, 7 (0.06%)
  - Christians, 99.94%
- 1808 Overall population, 1,169
  - Jews, 70 (6%)
  - Christians, 94%
- 1857 Overall population, 3,817
  - Jews, 636 (16.7%)
  - Christians, 83.3%
- 1920s Overall population, >16,000
  - Jews, 8,000 (c. 40%)
