= Chanoch Gad Justman =

Chanoch (Heinich) Gad Justman or Henoch God or Yustman (1883–1942), the 2nd Piltzer Rebbe, was a Gerrer Hasid, a community Rabbi, Hasidic Rebbe, Rosh Yeshiva, and a member of Moetzes Gedolei HaTorah. In 1942 was deported to the Treblinka extermination camp where he was murdered.

Chanoch Gad Justman was born in Góra Kalwaria - Poland, to his father Rabbi Pinchas Menachem, and mother Hendel Leah – sister of Rabbi Yehuda Aryeh Leib Alter.

Chanoch Gad Married Mrs. Devora Matill Halperin the daughter of Rabbi Chaim Halperin.

Chanoch Gad was a follower (Hasid) of his uncle Rabbi Yehuda Aryeh Leib Alter of Ger. After the death of his uncle in 1905, his father moved to Pilica (Piltz) to become the community Rabbi, and the first Piltzer Rebbe (Hasidic Rebbe for some Ger Hasidim). In 1907 Reb Chanoch Gad followed is father and moved to Piltz. He served in Piltz as an unofficial community-Rabbi. In 1915 he became the community Rabbi of Wieruszów. He moved to Wieruszów with his father. This time the job was divided between father and son, Heinich Gad as community Rabbi and father Pinchas Menachem, Rebbe of Hasidim. In 1919 his father moved to Częstochowa while he stayed in Wieruszów. After the death of his father in 1921, he became the second Piltzer Rebbe, at the request of his cousin, the Rebbe of Ger, Rabbi Avraham Mordechai Alter. Chanoch Gad moved to Częstochowa. In 1931 he became the community Rabbi of Wieluń.

Chanoch Gad Served as Rosh Yeshiva of Yishvat Sifsei Tadik in Częstochowa. Also served a member of the Moetzes Gedolei HaTorah of Agudath Yisroel in Poland, and the World Aguda.

== World War II ==
On 1 September 1939, the first day of the WW2, the Germans Luftwaffe started bombing the City of Wieluń. It killed an estimated 1,300 civilians and destroyed 90 percent of the town center. Wieluń was annexed to the third Reich. Rabbi Henoch Gad decided to flee with his family and remaining community. First he escaped to Łódź, from Łódź to Warsaw, to Częstochowa. After the Rebbe escaped Wieluń, his home was hit by German Bombs and destroyed.

In Częstochowa Ghetto, his home was a gathering place for secret meetings of Rabbi's and activists, as well as a place for starving and abandoned refugees. He encouraged and comforted everyone at these moments.

He continued teaching Torah and Hasidot in the ghetto, and insisted on resuming services in Warszawska 23 Synagogue, despite the great danger.

The Rebbe encouraged people to learn Torah in the synagogue with friends. Avraham Yeshaya Lewnhoff lectured in Synagogue on ul. Berka Joselewicza.

Henoch Gad taught his followers Hilchot Kiddush Hashem (Laws of martyrdom). In a special booklet printed underground by Rabbi Aryeh Tzvi Frumer of Kozieglowy.

In March 1942, Chaim Yerachmiel Widawski (1913–1986. later living in Antwerp) and Yitzhak Justman, (who lived for a short time in Israel and died in New York) two escapees from Chełmno extermination camp, arrived in Częstochowa and told Rabbi Chanoch Gad Justman the horror story that was beyond belief. The Rebbe's reaction to the news of Jews being gassed to death was intense: he collapsed and couldn't get up for several days. From then on Chanoch Gad Justman encouraged Jews to send the young people out of the ghetto-including the girls, whose mothers were reluctant to send them away from home.

In 1942, he was deported to the Treblinka death camp where he was murdered.
