= Ruda, Wieluń County =

Ruda
- Village
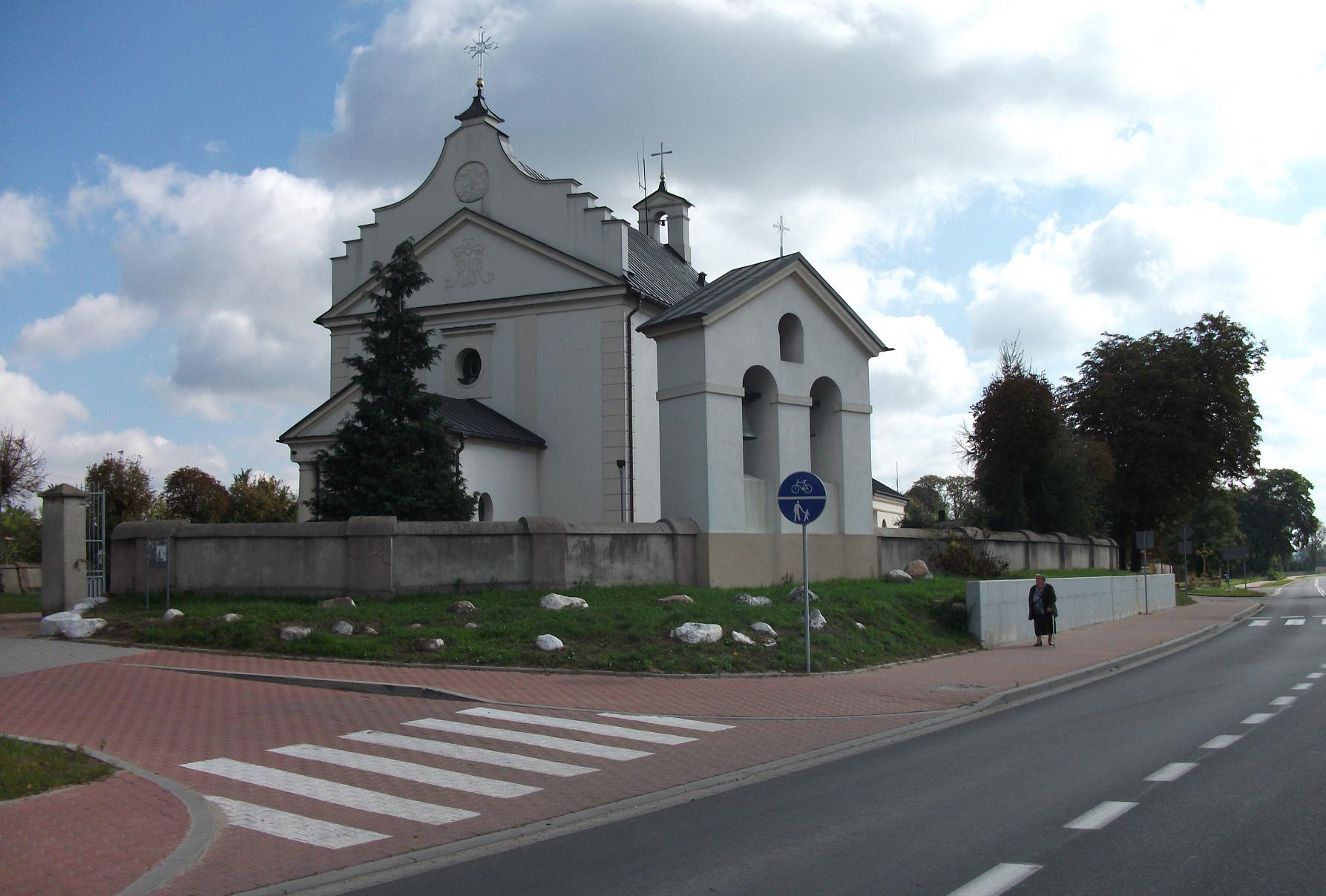
- Saint Adalbert church in Ruda

- Location within Poland
- Coordinates: 51°12′5″N 18°36′22″E
- Country: Poland
- Voivodeship: Łódź
- County: Wieluń
- Gmina: Wieluń
- Population: 1,300
- Time zone: UTC+1 (CET)
  - Summer (DST): UTC+2 (CEST)
- Vehicle registration: EWI

Ruda [ˈruda] is a village in the administrative district of Gmina Wieluń, within Wieluń County, Łódź Voivodeship, in south-central Poland.

== Origin of the name ==
The name Ruda probably comes from rich iron ore deposits, which were mined in the Middle Ages using the dukel method in swampy meadows around the settlement. Iron forges still functioned in the 16th century.

== History ==
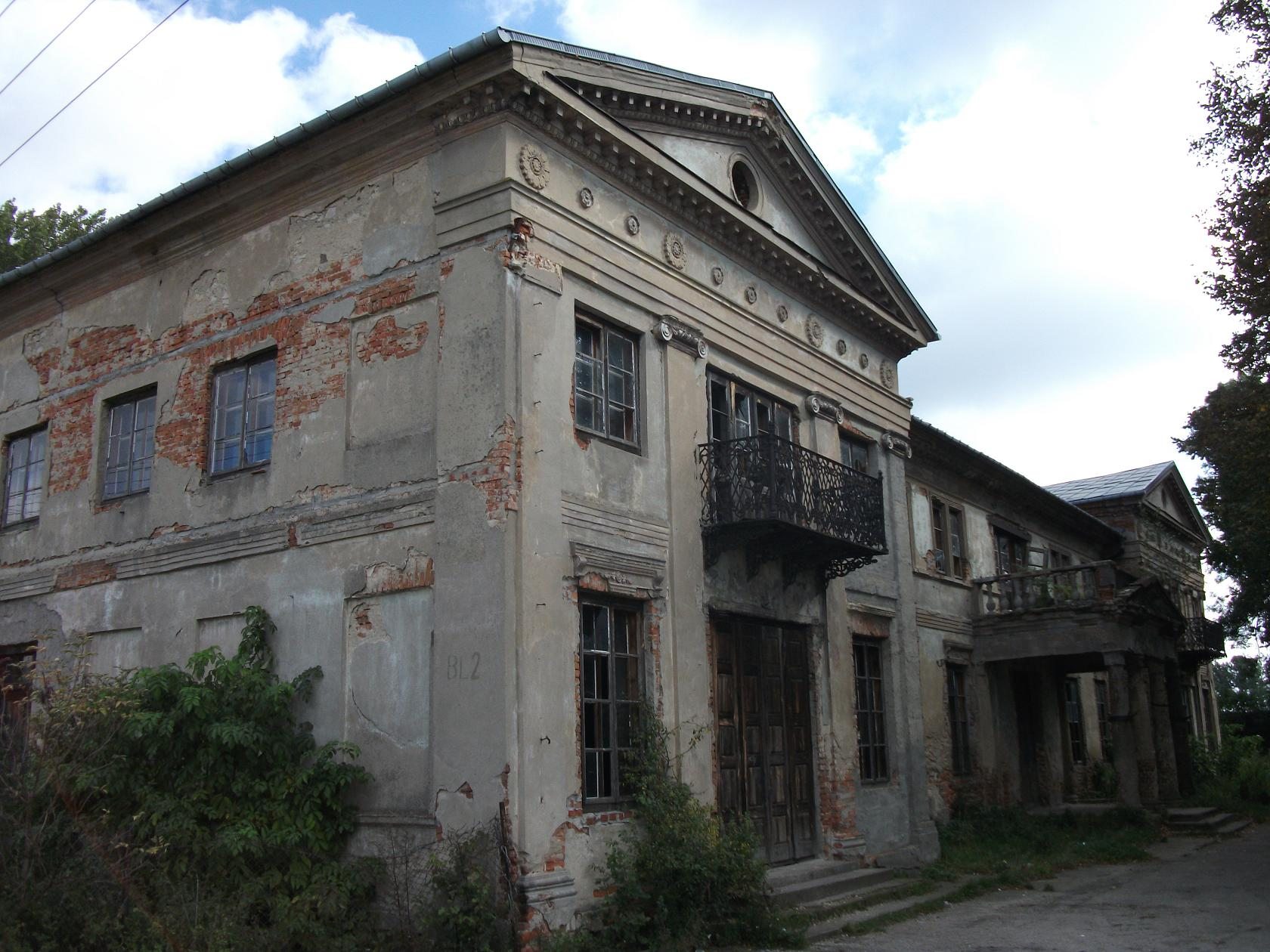
Palace in Ruda

It was discovered that the first human settlement in this area existed already in the Neolithic period (2,500–1700 years BC).

The defensive castellan stronghold, which has not been identified so far, was probably established at the turn of the 10th / 11th centuries. Ruda, at least from the first half of the 12th century, was the capital of the region.

One of the oldest Polish castellanies is mentioned in the chronicle of Gallus Anonymus on the date of 1106, and immediately in connection with the residence of the ducal court and the consecration of the church in Ruda. Its existence is confirmed by the bull of Pope Innocent II from 1136, when it refers to the castellans of Ruda. The parish church of St. Wojciech, according to tradition, was funded by Piotr Dunin in 1142. During the 13th century, Ruda was still one of the most important centers in Wielkopolska. Its medieval development was due to its location on the route connecting Moravia and Upper Silesia in the south with Kuyavia, Pomerania, Gdańsk and Prussia in the north. Already before 1264, it was granted town rights, as evidenced by the mention of the mayor Fryderyk from 1264 and 1266. The Wielkopolska Chronicle and Jan Długosz also mention the urban character of Rudy. In the end, the attempt to develop the town was not successful. During the reign of King Przemysł II, an administrative unit was defined as the Rudzka Land.

By the end of the 13th century, Ruda had lost its role as an economic and political center of the region in favor of the nearby town of Wieluń, which was founded in a better, drier area. The castellany was moved to Wieluń possibly by King Casimir III the Great in the 14th century. In 1419–20, the archdeaconry and the College of Canons were transferred to Wieluń. In this way, Ruda became an ordinary village.

In 1827, it had a population of 268.

During the German occupation of Poland, in 1940, the German gendarmerie carried out expulsions of Poles. They were placed in a transit camp in Łódź, then young Poles were deported to forced labour in Germany and German-occupied France, while others were deported to the General Government in the more eastern part of German-occupied Poland. Houses and farms of expelled Poles were handed over to German colonists as part of the Lebensraum policy.

In 1975–1998, the village belonged administratively to the Sieradz Voivodship.
