= Chanokh Heynekh HaKohen Levin =

Polish rabbi (1798–1870)

- Title: Rebbe Reb Heynekh of Aleksander

Personal life
- Born: Chanokh Heynekh Lewin; 1798 Lutomiersk, South Prussia, Prussia
- Died: 21 March 1870 (aged 71–72) Aleksandrów Łódzki, Poland
- Buried: Aleksandrów Łódzki
- Spouse: Chana Hentshe Feyge Pachter of Przysucha, Chaia Basia (daughter of Rabbi Yehoshua Usher Rabinowicz of Parysow d. Przasnysz, 27 Feb 1864)
- Children: Yechiel Efraim Fishel (1822 Przysucha – 1894 Ruda Maleniecka); Bracha Szyfra Miryam (before 1820 Przysucha – 1886 Lodz); Chaya Tsipora (before 1822 Przysucha – ?)
- Parents: Pinchas Lewin (1765 Lutomiersk – 1837 Lutomiersk) (father); Soro Chano Szatan (about 1779 Kalisz – 22 April 1863 Przasnysz) (mother)

Religious life
- Religion: Judaism

Jewish leader
- Predecessor: Yitzchak Meir Alter
- Successor: Yehudah Aryeh Leib Alter; Avrohom Bornsztain
- Began: June 1866
- Ended: 21 March 1870
- Main work: Chashovoh leToivo

Chanokh Heynekh HaKohen Levin (1798 – 21 March 1870) of Aleksander served as the rebbe of a community of thousands of Hasidim during the "interregnum" between the Chidushei HaRim of Ger and the Sfas Emes.

== Biography ==
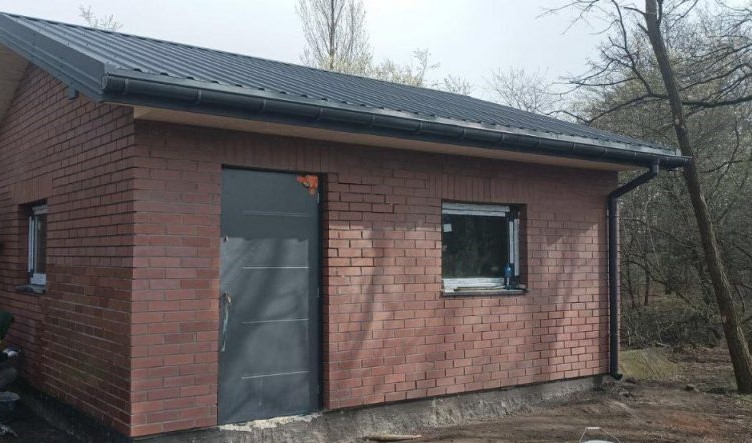
The grave of Chanokh Heynekh HaKohen Levin in Aleksandrow Lodzki - 2024

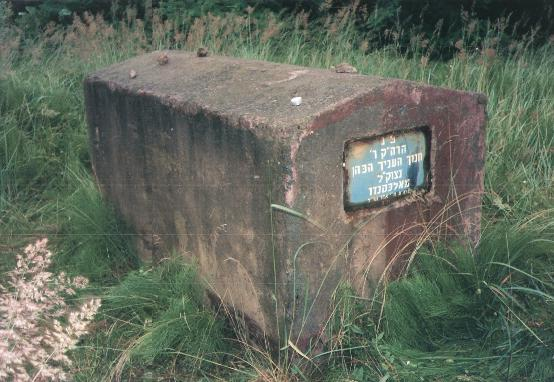
The grave of Chanokh Heynekh HaKohen Levin in Aleksandrow Lodzki - 1998

Levin was one of the leading students of the Rebbe Reb Simcha Bunim of Peshischa. After the latter's death he became one of the most prominent followers of Rebbe Menachem Mendel of Kotzk and the senior disciple of Chidushei haRim. Following the death of the Chidushei haRim in 1866, the bulk of his numerous chasidim chose Rabbi Chanokh Heynekh as the next rebbe.

Levin served as the Rabbi in the Jewish communities of Aleksander from approximately 1837 until 1853, Nowy Dwór from 1853 through 1859, and Przasnysz from 1859 until 1864 (or 1866). After his tenure in Przasnysz he retired from the rabbinate and settled in Aleksander, where he lived during his period of leadership as rebbe.

His teachings are collected in Chashava Letova (first published in 1929), and are quoted widely.
