= Memorial book =

Memorial book may refer to:

- Confraternity book, a register of the names of people who were remembered in the prayers of a church or monastery
- Book of remembrance, a book commemorating those who have died
- Yizkor book, a memorial book commemorating a Jewish community destroyed during the Holocaust
