= Wieluń =

Town in Poland

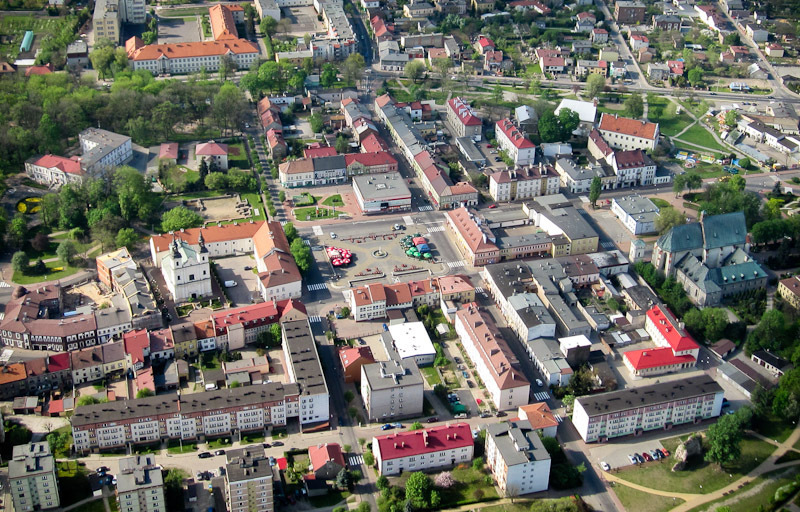
- Old town in Wieluń

- Flag Coat of arms

- Location within Poland
- Coordinates: 51°13′14″N 18°34′12″E
- Country: Poland
- Voivodeship: Łódź
- County: Wieluń
- Gmina: Wieluń
- First mentioned: 1282
- Town rights: 1283

Government
  - Mayor: Paweł Okrasa

Area
  - Total: 16.9 km^{2} (6.5 sq mi)

Population (31 December 2021)
  - Total: 21,624 ▼
  - Density: 1,280/km^{2} (3,310/sq mi)
- Time zone: UTC+1 (CET)
  - Summer (DST): UTC+2 (CEST)
- Postal code: 98–300
- Area code: +48 43
- Website: http://www.wielun.eu/

Wieluń [ˈvjɛluɲ] (German: Welun; Latin: Velun) is a town in south-central Poland with 21,624 inhabitants (2021). The town is the seat of the Gmina Wieluń and Wieluń County, and is located within the Łódź Voivodeship. Wieluń is a capital of the historical Wieluń Land.

Wieluń has a long and rich history. In the past, it used to be an important urban trade centre of the Kingdom of Poland. Several Polish kings and notables visited the town, but following the catastrophic Swedish Deluge (1655–1660), Wieluń declined and never regained its status. In September 1939, during the invasion of Poland, it was heavily bombed by the Luftwaffe. The Bombing of Wieluń is considered to be the first World War II bombing in Europe. It killed at least 127 civilians, injured hundreds more and destroyed the majority of the town.

== Origin of the name ==
Wieluń was first mentioned in a 1282 document as the town of Velun (in 1283: Vilin). The exact origin of the name has not been explained. Historians claim that either it comes from a Slavic word "vel" (which means a wetland), or from a given name Wielisław. Jan Długosz wrote that Wieluń was located in the area abundant with water, which may mean that the former theory is correct.

== History ==
=== Middle Ages ===
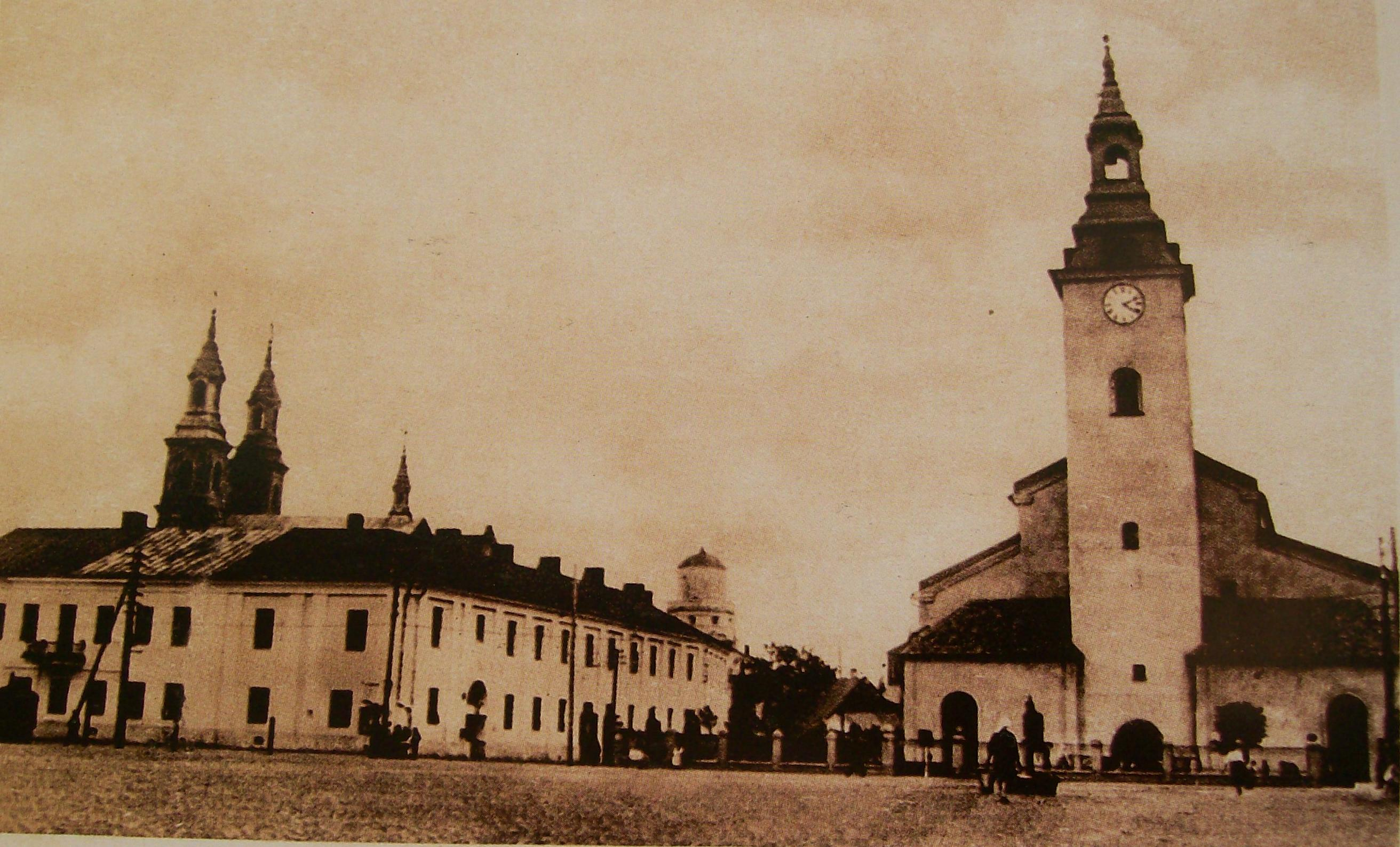
Old Town in 1910

The Land of Wieluń (ziemia wieluńska, Terra Velumensis) was a historic land of the Kingdom of Poland and the Polish–Lithuanian Commonwealth, which for centuries was part of Sieradz Voivodeship, Greater Poland Province.

It was based on the medieval Castellany of Ruda (located some 4 km (2 mi) from Wieluń), which was established in the 10th or 11th century. Ruda was the seat of a castellan and a Roman Catholic archdeacon, which made it the center of local administration. In the mid-13th century, however, the importance of Ruda diminished, at the expense of Wieluń, which was located in a more convenient spot. In 1281, the castellan's office was moved to Wieluń, and by 1299, the term Land of Ruda (Ziemia rudzka) had been replaced in documents by Land of Wieluń (Ziemia wieluńska).

The medieval Castellany of Ruda, which was established in the 10th or 11th century. The Castellany of Ruda was first mentioned in the 1136 Bull of Gniezno, and during the period known as Fragmentation of Poland (see Testament of Bolesław III Wrymouth), it was part of the Seniorate Province. As a result of ongoing power struggles in the districts during Fragmentation of Poland, Mieszko III the Old regained Greater Poland in 1181 and incorporated the Wieluń Land into it. In the late 12th century, the Castellany was acquired by Duke Władysław Odonic, and in 1217 it became property of Władysław III Spindleshanks. Later on, it was ruled by the Dukes of Silesia from the Duchy of Opole, and in the second half of the 13th century, was in Duchy of Greater Poland. In 1281, the castellany was moved from Ruda to Wieluń, and since then, it has been called the Land of Wieluń.

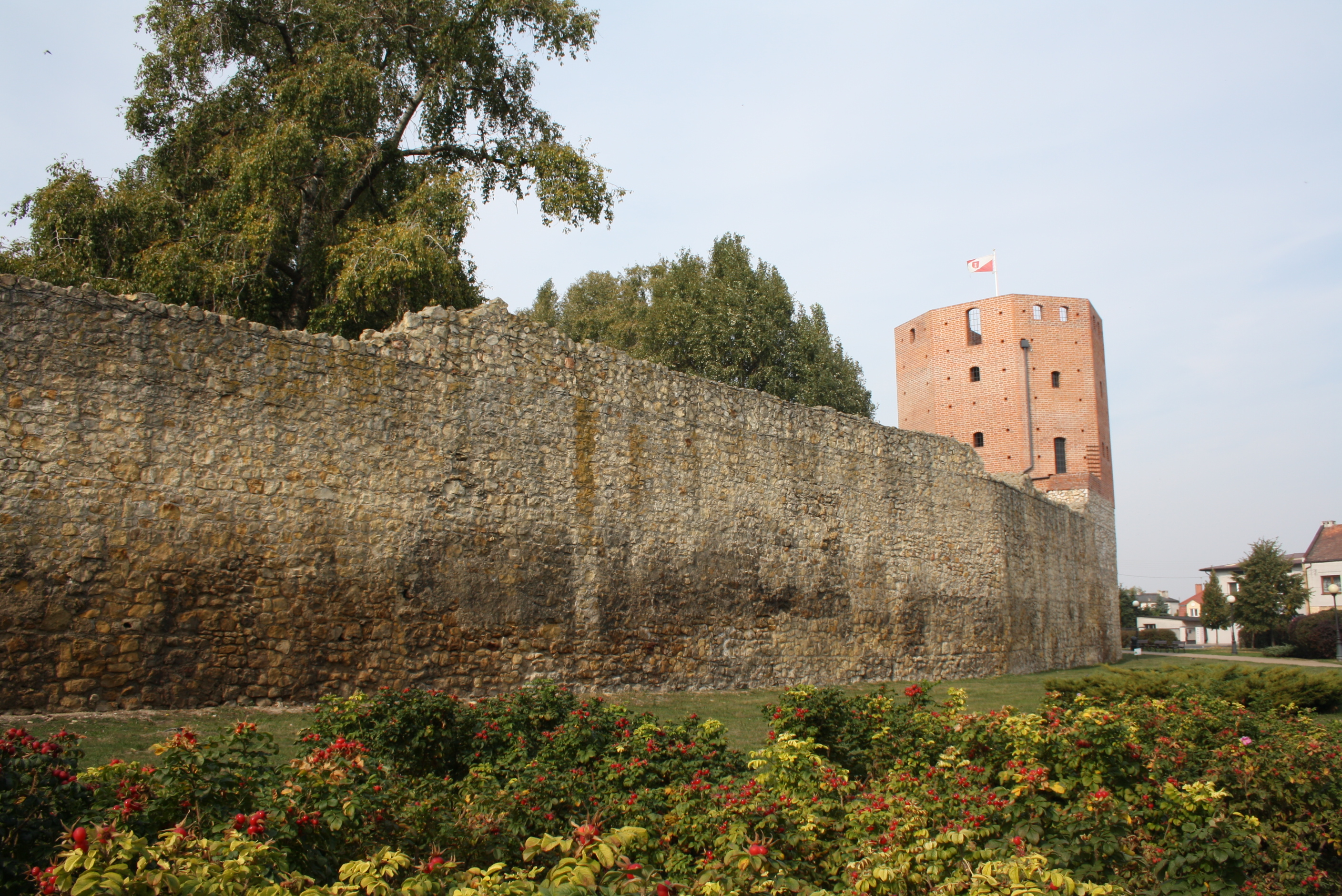
Medieval defensive walls

The settlement of Wieluń was founded probably in c. 1220 by Duke Władysław Odonic. It was first mentioned in documents in 1282, and probably in the same year it received a town charter. In the mid-14th century King Casimir III the Great built a castle here, which was part of defensive system protecting the border between the Kingdom of Poland and Czech-ruled Silesia. The castle itself was remodeled several times, due to frequent fires and wars. Currently, there is a Classicistic palace in its location.

In both Kingdom of Poland and the Polish–Lithuanian Commonwealth, the Land of Wieluń as part of Sieradz Voivodeship had its own civil servants, offices and courts, and the Castellan of Wieluń was one of Senators of Poland. The land had four starostas – at Wieluń itself, Ostrzeszów, Bolesławiec and Grabów nad Prosną. Two deputies to the Sejm were elected at Wieluń's Sejmiks, furthermore, the Voivode of Sieradz (of the Sieradz Voivodeship) was obliged to appoint his deputy from Wieluń.

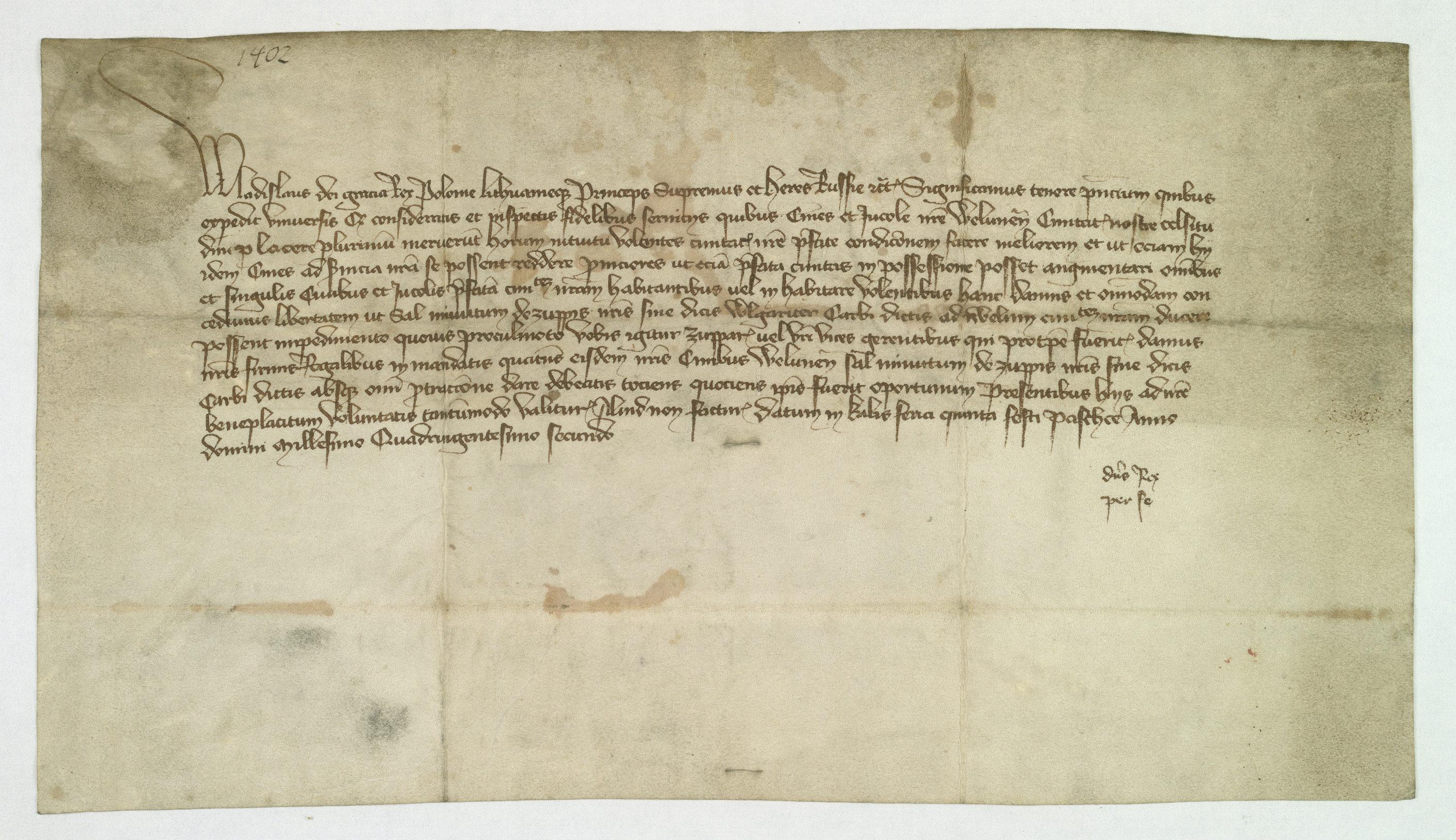
Royal privilege regarding salt trade, granted by King Władysław II Jagiełło in 1402

In 1370, following the last will of Casimir the Great, King Louis I of Hungary handed the Land of Wieluń to Duke of Opole, Władysław Opolczyk. In the same period, the Archbishop of Gniezno, Jarosław of Bogoria and Skotnik built a manor house in Wieluń. The town remained in the hands of Władysław Opolczyk until 1395, when it was returned to Poland. Wieluń quickly developed, in the 1390s a Paulists church together with an abbey were built, and in 1413, Archbishop Mikołaj Trąba moved the ancient collegiate church from Ruda to Wieluń. In the 1440s and 1450s, Wieluń was frequently destroyed in raids of Silesian dukes. By that time, it had already been an important center of commerce and government.

The Land of Wieluń had its own coat of arms, established between 1410 and 1434. It can be found on the tomb of King Władysław II Jagiełło, together with coats of arms of Poland, Lithuania, Ruthenia, Greater Poland, and the Dobrzyń Land. Historically, the Land of Wieluń covers current counties of Wieluń, Ostrzeszów, Kępno and Wieruszów, as well as some locations in the counties of Olesno and Pajęczno.

=== Modern era ===
Wieluń prospered in the 16th century, the so-called Polish Golden Age. It was a royal city of Poland and capital of the Land of Wieluń, part of the Sieradz Voivodeship in the Greater Poland Province. At the beginning of the 17th century, the mother of future Grand Crown Hetman Stanisław Koniecpolski, one of the greatest commanders in Polish history, founded a Renaissance monastery of the Bernardine nuns in Wieluń, now housing a museum dedicated to the town's history. The town was devastated in the War of the Polish Succession, as the Battle of Byczyna took place near Wieluń. Good times ended in the catastrophic Swedish invasion (1655–1660), when the town was ransacked and burned both by the Swedish invaders, and by Polish troops, who took revenge on its Protestant residents for their support of the Lutheran Swedes. Finally, in 1707–1711, Wieluń's population was decimated by a plague (see miasma theory), which killed 2,000. Following the Second Partition of Poland in 1793, Wieluń briefly belonged to the Kingdom of Prussia, in 1807 it became part of the newly formed, but short-lived, Polish Duchy of Warsaw, and in 1815 it became part of Russian-controlled Congress Poland, where it remained until World War I. The town burned twice (1791, 1858), and after the second fire, it was rebuilt in a new shape. After World War I, Poland regained independence in 1918, and in the interbellum Wieluń was a county seat in the Łódź Voivodeship.

=== World War II ===
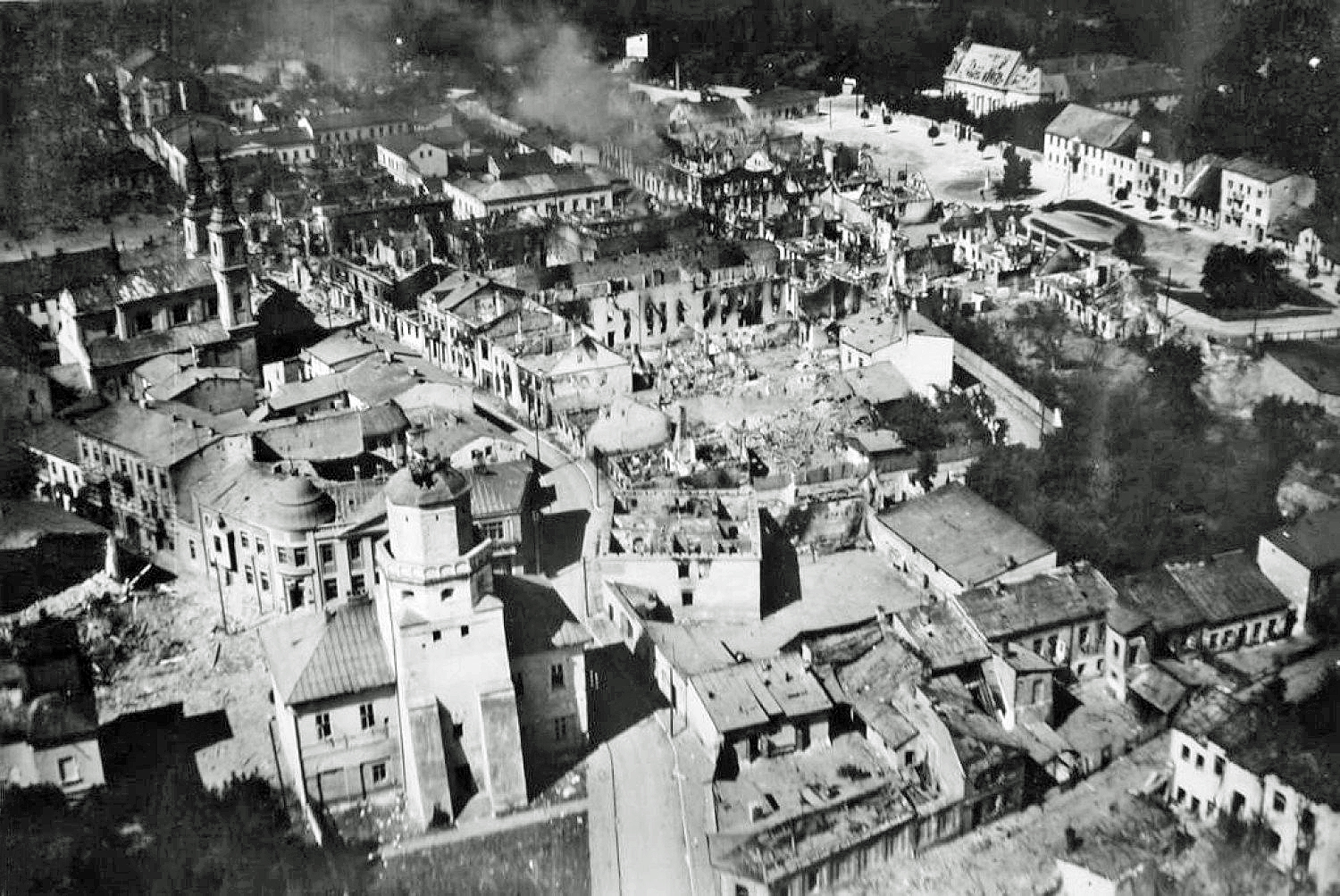
Wieluń just after Luftwaffe bombing on 1 September 1939

On 1 September 1939, the city was bombed by the German Luftwaffe in the first action of World War II (apart from the Jabłonków Incident on 25/26 August). In the Bombing of Wieluń, German planes destroyed most of the town centre, including a clearly marked hospital, a synagogue, and the historic Gothic church, and killed at least 127 civilians. According to Norman Davies, the bombings destroyed three quarters of the town. Thousands were injured and many fled. No Polish military units were present in Wieluń at that time (31 August – 1 September 1939).

By decision from 5 September 1939, one of the first three German special courts in occupied Poland was established in the town; it was eventually moved to Piotrków Trybunalski on September 22, 1939. On 6–8 September 1939 the Einsatzgruppe II entered the town, and mass searches of Polish offices and organizations were carried out. Already on September 8, 1939, inhabitants of Wieluń were among the 30 Poles massacred by German troops in Chechło near Pabianice. Wieluń was annexed to Nazi Germany on 8 October 1939 and placed under the administration of Reichsgau Wartheland. The Germans instigated a reign of terror against the Jewish population of Wieluń, which had lived there since the 1500s and amounted to around 4,000 people at the beginning of the war. Jews were kidnapped for forced labour with little pay.

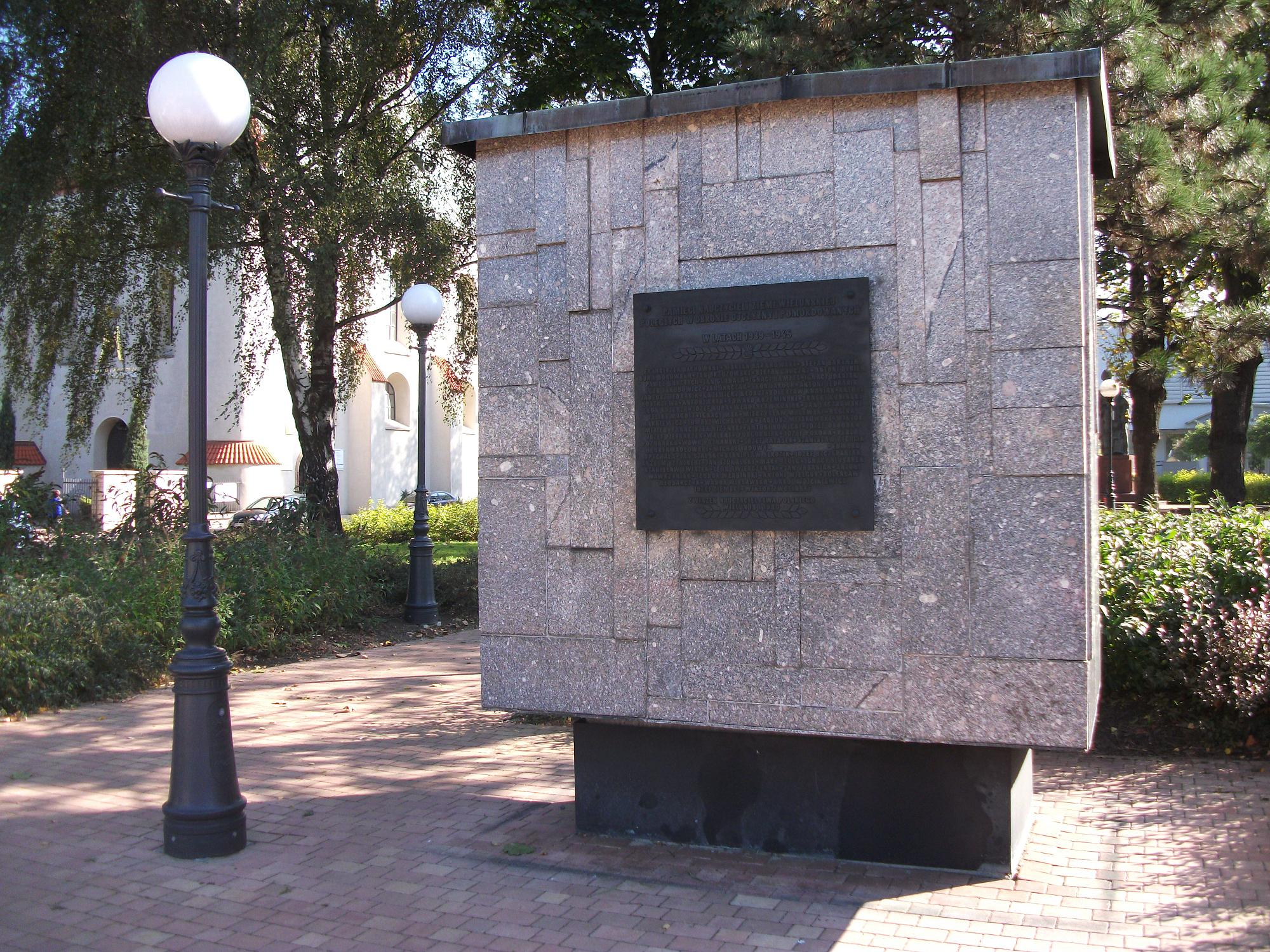
Monument to local teachers fallen or murdered during World War II

Around 40 Poles from Wieluń were murdered by the Soviets in the large Katyn massacre in April to May 1940. In June 1940, the Germans expelled around 200 Poles, owners of villas, which were handed over to new German officials or converted to German offices. During the German occupation, a transit camp was operated in the town for Poles expelled from the region, who were then either deported to the so-called General Government in the eastern part of German-occupied Poland or to forced labour in Germany and German-occupied France or sent as slave laborers to new German colonists in the town's vicinity. The Germans also established and operated a Nazi prison in the town, and looted the local historical numismatic collection, which they sent to a newly established German museum in occupied Poznań. In 1941, Jews were forced into a ghetto. Many were then sent away to labour camps. In January 1942, the German publicly hanged ten Jews. Later that year, the 2,000 Jews still remaining in the city and others brought to Wieluń were rounded up and confined for several days in a church building without food or water. Several died there of exhaustion, others were murdered and 900 were then selected and sent to the Łódź Ghetto. The rest were sent to the Chełmno extermination camp, where they were immediately gassed. Seventy to one hundred Wieluń Jews survived the war, and many returned to the city although most left soon afterward.

The city was liberated on 19 January 1945 by troops of the Soviet 1st Ukrainian Front in the course of the Sandomierz–Silesian Offensive.

== Climate ==
Wieluń has an oceanic climate (Köppen climate classification: Cfb) using the −3 °C (27 °F) isotherm or a humid continental climate (Köppen climate classification: Dfb) using the 0 °C (32 °F) isotherm.

Climate data for Wieluń (1991–2020 normals, extremes 1951–present)
Month	Jan	Feb	Mar	Apr	May	Jun	Jul	Aug	Sep	Oct	Nov	Dec	Year
Record high °C (°F)	13.8 (56.8)	18.0 (64.4)	23.8 (74.8)	29.5 (85.1)	31.7 (89.1)	36.4 (97.5)	36.4 (97.5)	37.1 (98.8)	34.8 (94.6)	26.3 (79.3)	19.9 (67.8)	15.2 (59.4)	37.1 (98.8)
Mean daily maximum °C (°F)	1.7 (35.1)	3.3 (37.9)	7.9 (46.2)	14.7 (58.5)	19.5 (67.1)	22.8 (73.0)	25.1 (77.2)	24.9 (76.8)	19.4 (66.9)	13.4 (56.1)	7.4 (45.3)	2.7 (36.9)	13.6 (56.5)
Daily mean °C (°F)	−1.0 (30.2)	0.1 (32.2)	3.5 (38.3)	9.2 (48.6)	13.9 (57.0)	17.2 (63.0)	19.3 (66.7)	19.0 (66.2)	14.2 (57.6)	9.1 (48.4)	4.3 (39.7)	0.3 (32.5)	9.1 (48.4)
Mean daily minimum °C (°F)	−3.4 (25.9)	−2.7 (27.1)	0.1 (32.2)	4.2 (39.6)	8.7 (47.7)	12.0 (53.6)	13.9 (57.0)	13.8 (56.8)	9.8 (49.6)	5.7 (42.3)	1.9 (35.4)	−1.9 (28.6)	5.2 (41.4)
Record low °C (°F)	−29.0 (−20.2)	−28.0 (−18.4)	−19.4 (−2.9)	−7.0 (19.4)	−2.4 (27.7)	−1.6 (29.1)	4.1 (39.4)	2.4 (36.3)	−2.9 (26.8)	−7.7 (18.1)	−17.3 (0.9)	−25.3 (−13.5)	−29.0 (−20.2)
Average precipitation mm (inches)	33.8 (1.33)	30.9 (1.22)	37.0 (1.46)	35.8 (1.41)	69.6 (2.74)	70.3 (2.77)	90.7 (3.57)	51.5 (2.03)	51.2 (2.02)	42.0 (1.65)	37.9 (1.49)	36.9 (1.45)	587.6 (23.13)
Average extreme snow depth cm (inches)	6.7 (2.6)	6.0 (2.4)	4.1 (1.6)	1.2 (0.5)	0.0 (0.0)	0.0 (0.0)	0.0 (0.0)	0.0 (0.0)	0.0 (0.0)	0.5 (0.2)	1.7 (0.7)	3.6 (1.4)	6.7 (2.6)
Average precipitation days (≥ 0.1 mm)	16.81	14.57	14.27	11.70	13.33	14.17	14.17	12.43	11.83	13.63	13.70	16.27	166.88
Average snowy days (≥ 0 cm)	14.9	13.6	6.1	0.9	0.0	0.0	0.0	0.0	0.0	0.3	3.1	9.6	48.5
Average relative humidity (%)	85.9	83.0	76.9	68.5	70.5	71.4	70.4	70.1	76.6	82.4	86.9	87.4	76.1
Mean monthly sunshine hours	51.1	69.6	123.5	188.9	240.7	234.7	245.4	232.4	163.8	114.9	58.0	43.3	1,766.2
Source 1: Institute of Meteorology and Water Management
Source 2: Meteomodel.pl (records, relative humidity 1991–2020)

== Sights ==
Sights of Wieluń (examples)

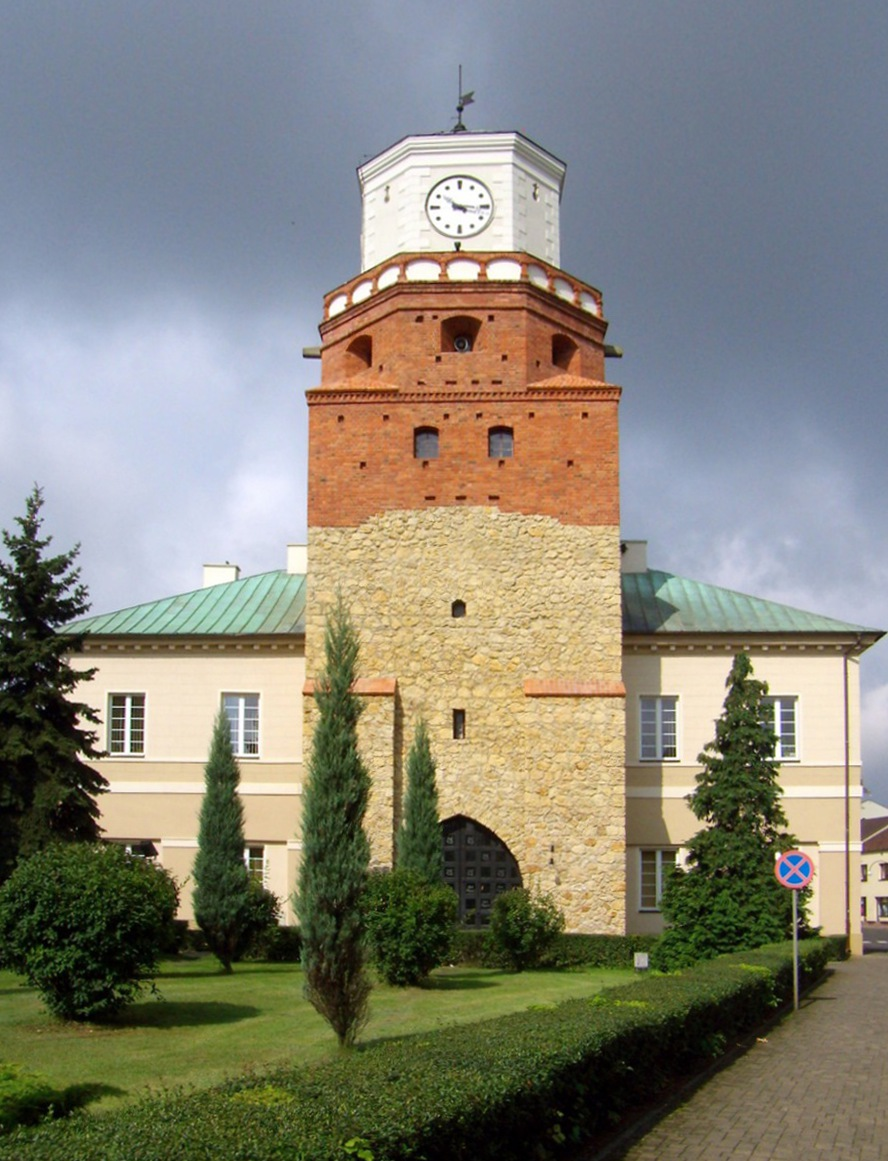
Town Hall

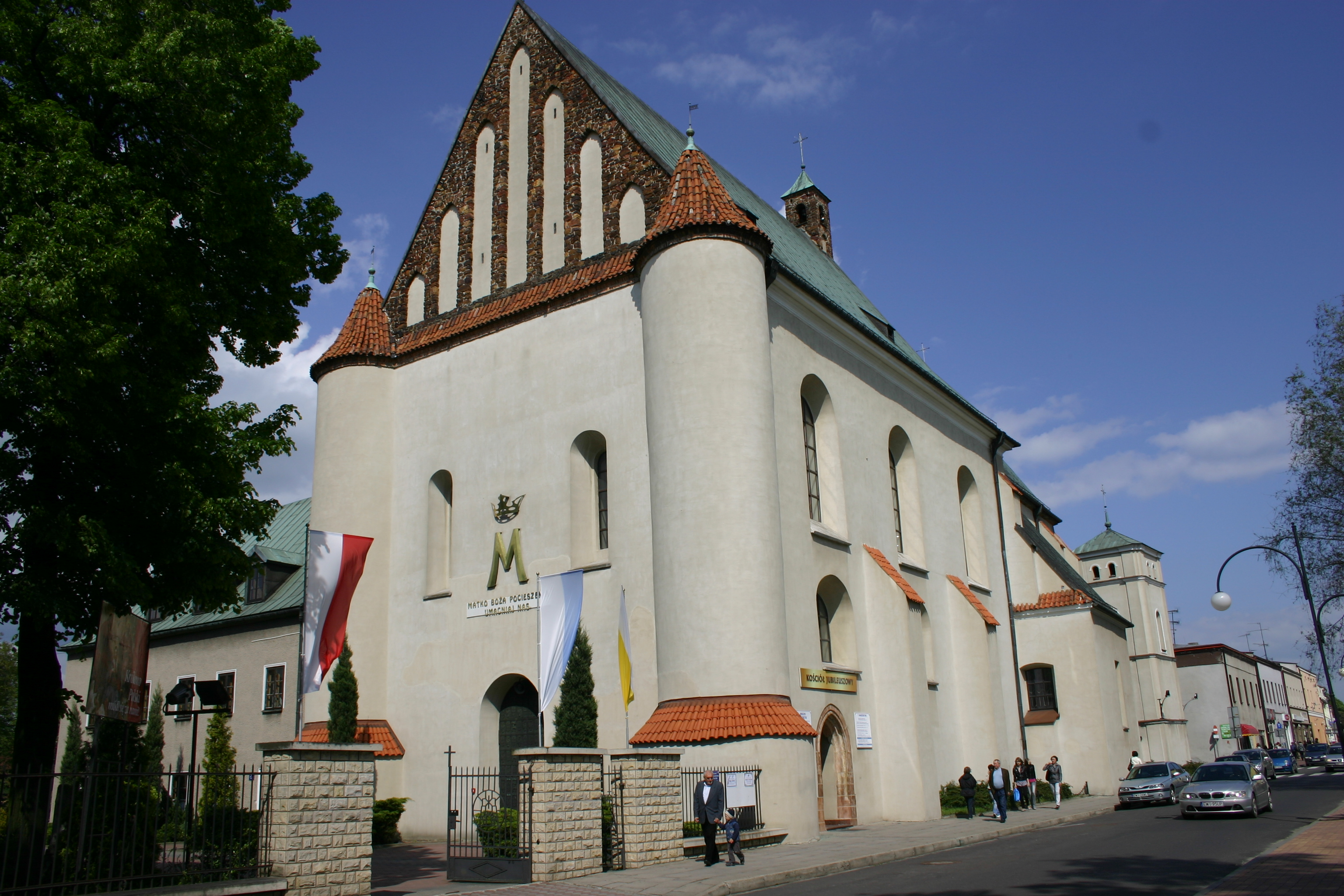
Corpus Christi Collegiate church

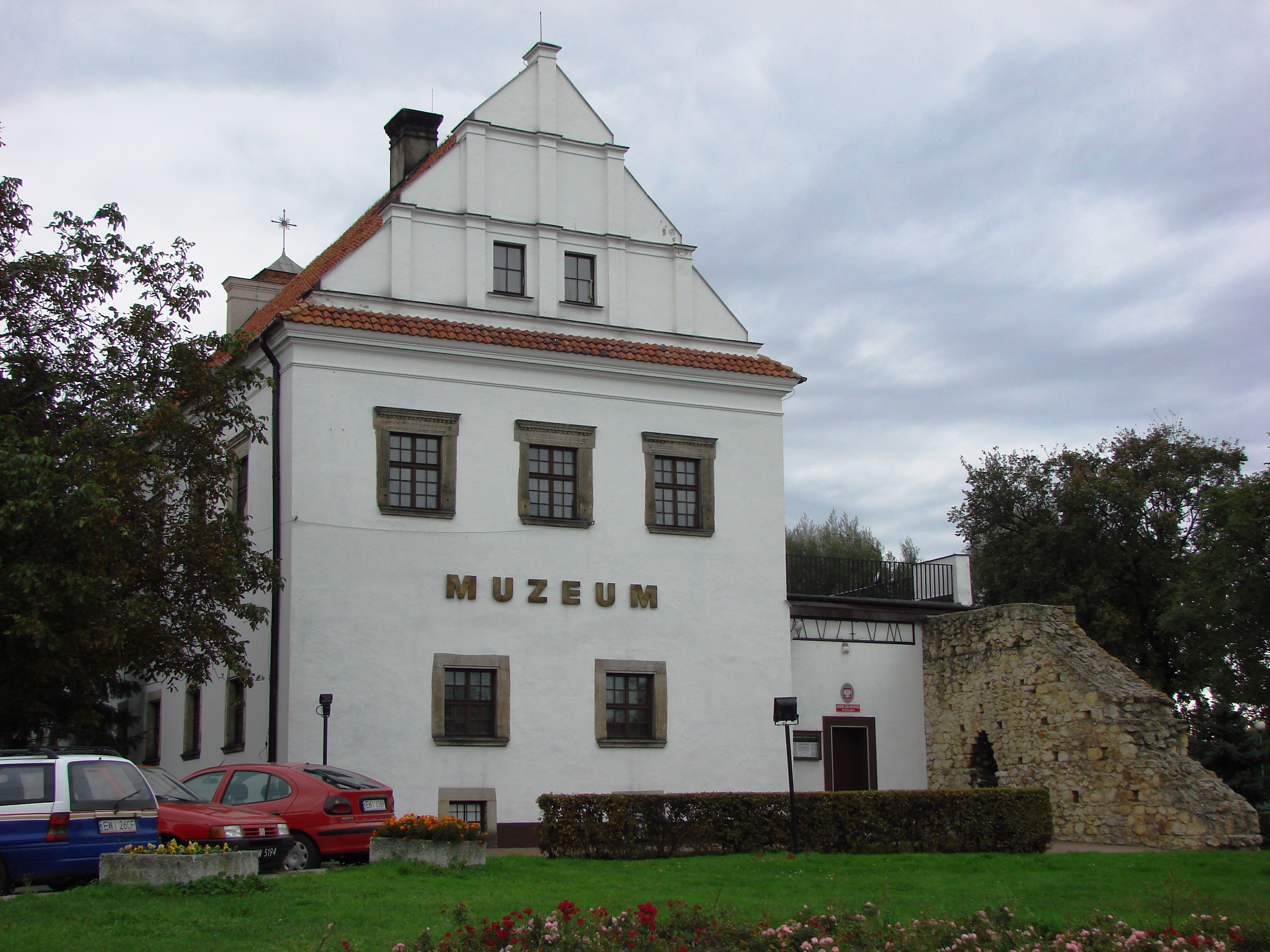
Museum of Wieluń Land

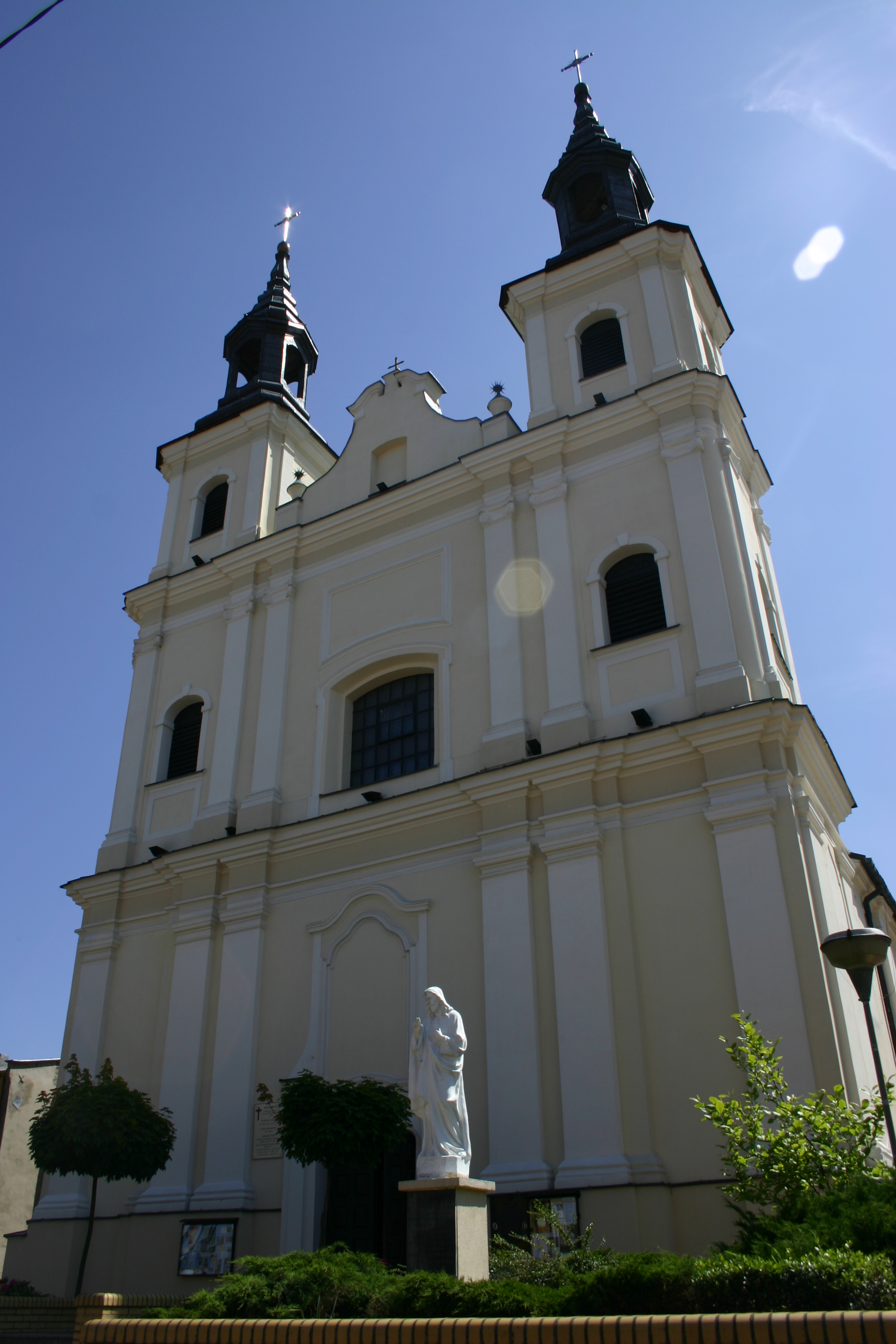
St. Joseph Church

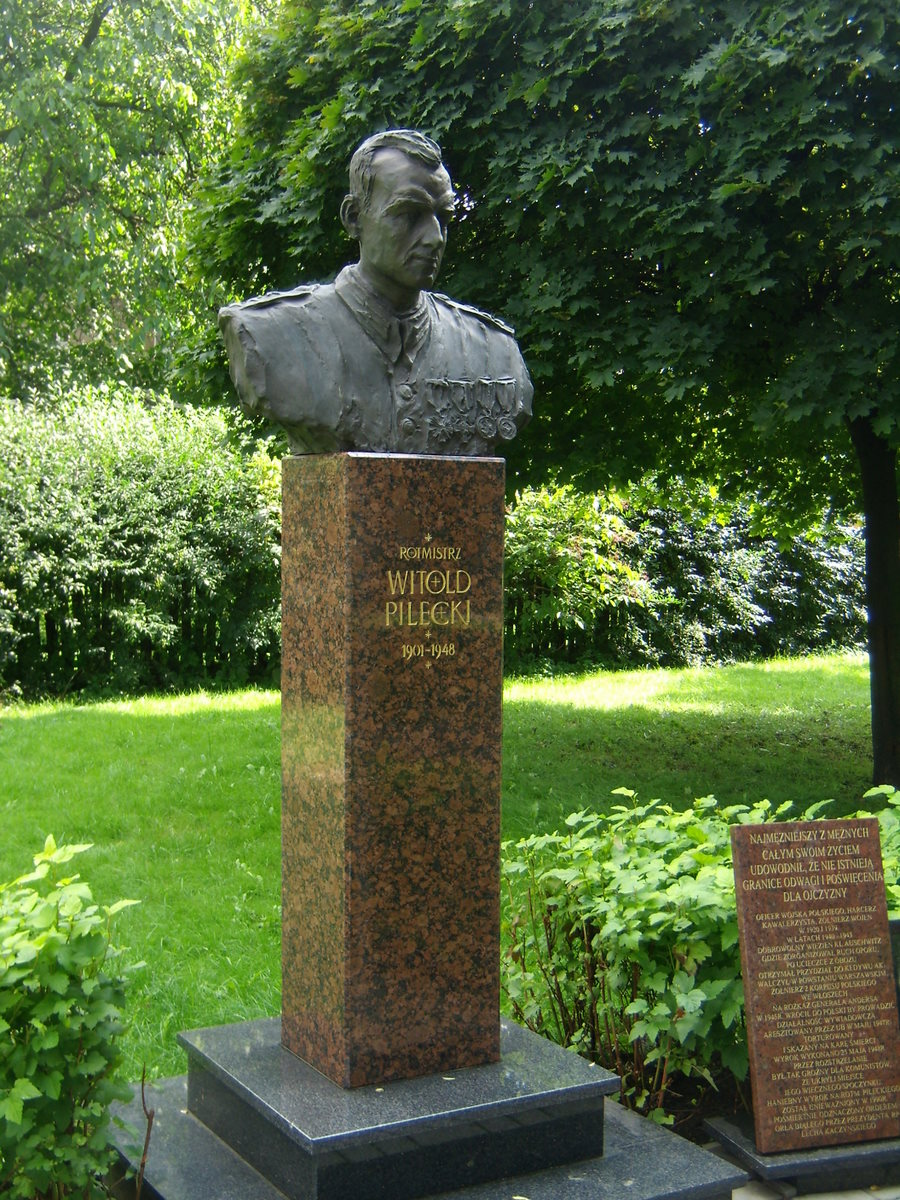
Monument of Witold Pilecki

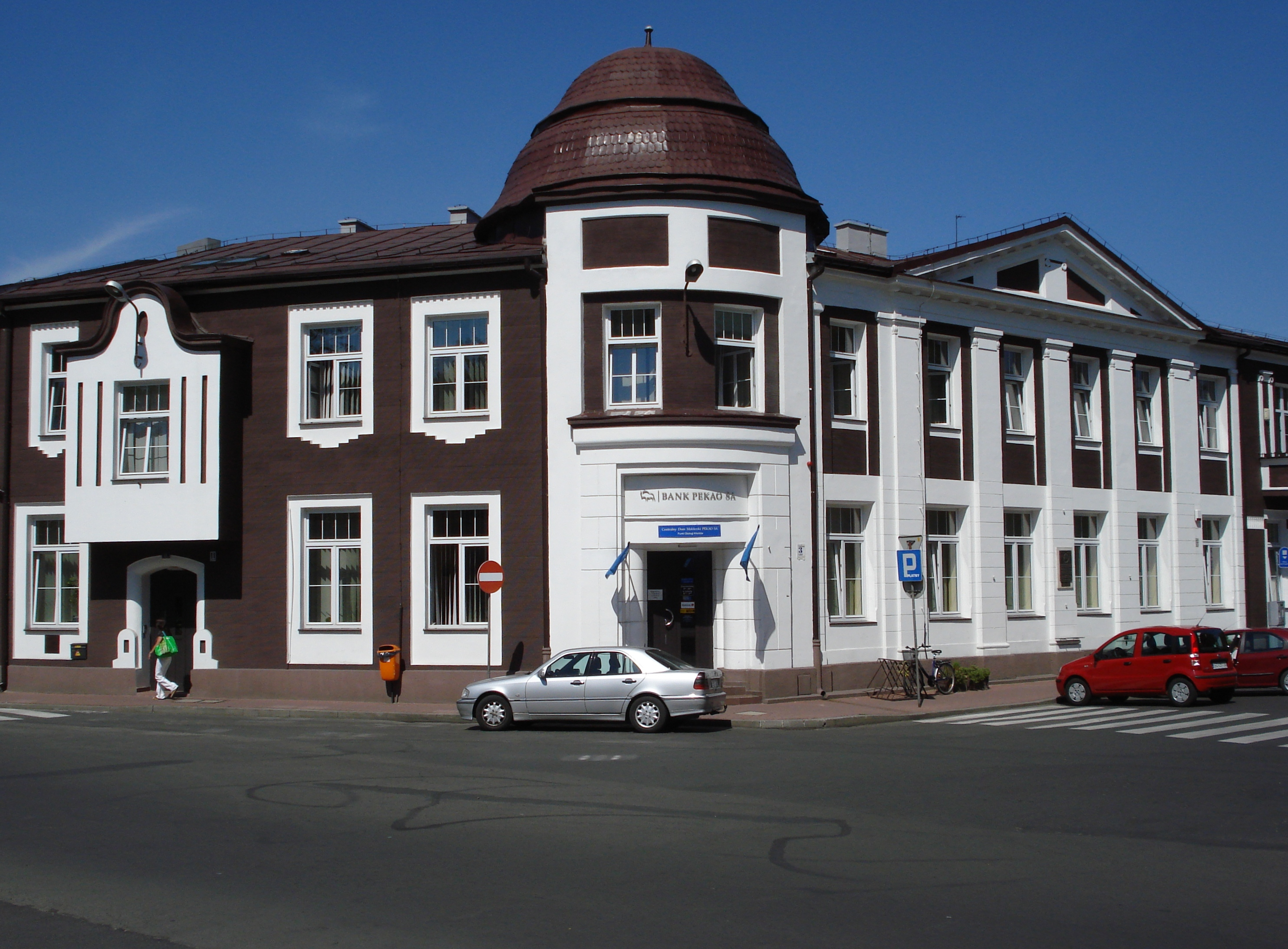
King Casimir the Great Square

Cultural heritage sights of Wieluń include the Town Hall, medieval defensive town walls, the former Piarist college, and several historic churches such as the Gothic Corpus Christi Collegiate church, the Gothic-Baroque Church of St. Nicholas, and Baroque churches of Saint Joseph and of the Annunciation of Mary.

The Museum of Wieluń Land (Muzeum Ziemi Wieluńskiej), located in the Renaissance Bernardine monastery, is the town's primary museum, dedicated to the history of Wieluń and its surroundings. It contains archaeological, ethnographic, historical and art collections. Displayed artifacts include jewelry and weaponry from the Bronze Age and Middle Ages, weapons and memorabilia from the 19th-century Polish national liberation uprisings, religious paintings and traditional folk sculptures, and Biblia Brzeska, one of the oldest Polish translations of the Bible. There is also an exhibition dedicated to the German bombing of Wieluń at the start World War II.

There are monuments to notable people such as Witold Pilecki and Pope John Paul II in Wieluń. There are also several World War II memorials, dedicated to the victims of the German bombing of 1939, to local Poles murdered by the Soviets in the Katyn massacre, to local Jews murdered by the German occupiers in the Holocaust, etc.

== Demographics ==
The majority of the population are Catholic.

Number of inhabitants in years

- 1900: 7,361
- 1909: 9,095; incl. 3,444 Jews (37.8%), 352 Protestants (3.9%) and no Mariavites.
- 1931: 13,220
- 2006: 24,347

== Transport ==
=== Roads ===
Wieluń is an important transportation hub. Main roads stemming from Wieluń include connection with Warsaw (to the north-east) and Wrocław (to the west), via the National Road DK 74. There are also two national roads: number DK 43 to Częstochowa and DK 45 to Opole and Łódź. Furthermore, there are two voivodeship (local) roads starting from Wieluń: road number 481 (going north-east) to Łask and road number 486 (going south-east) to Radomsko. The biggest communication problem in Wieluń is huge traffic (including transit) in the center of the town, due to lack of bypasses. A bypass of National Road DK 74 was fully completed and opened in March 2017, later additional bypasses will be built. The first section of the eastern bypass has already been finished. In the area of Wieluń there is also expressway S8 (it is located near the northern outskirts of the town). Additionally, there is a plan to build the 70 km (43 mi)-long Kalisz-Wieluń Road in the future.

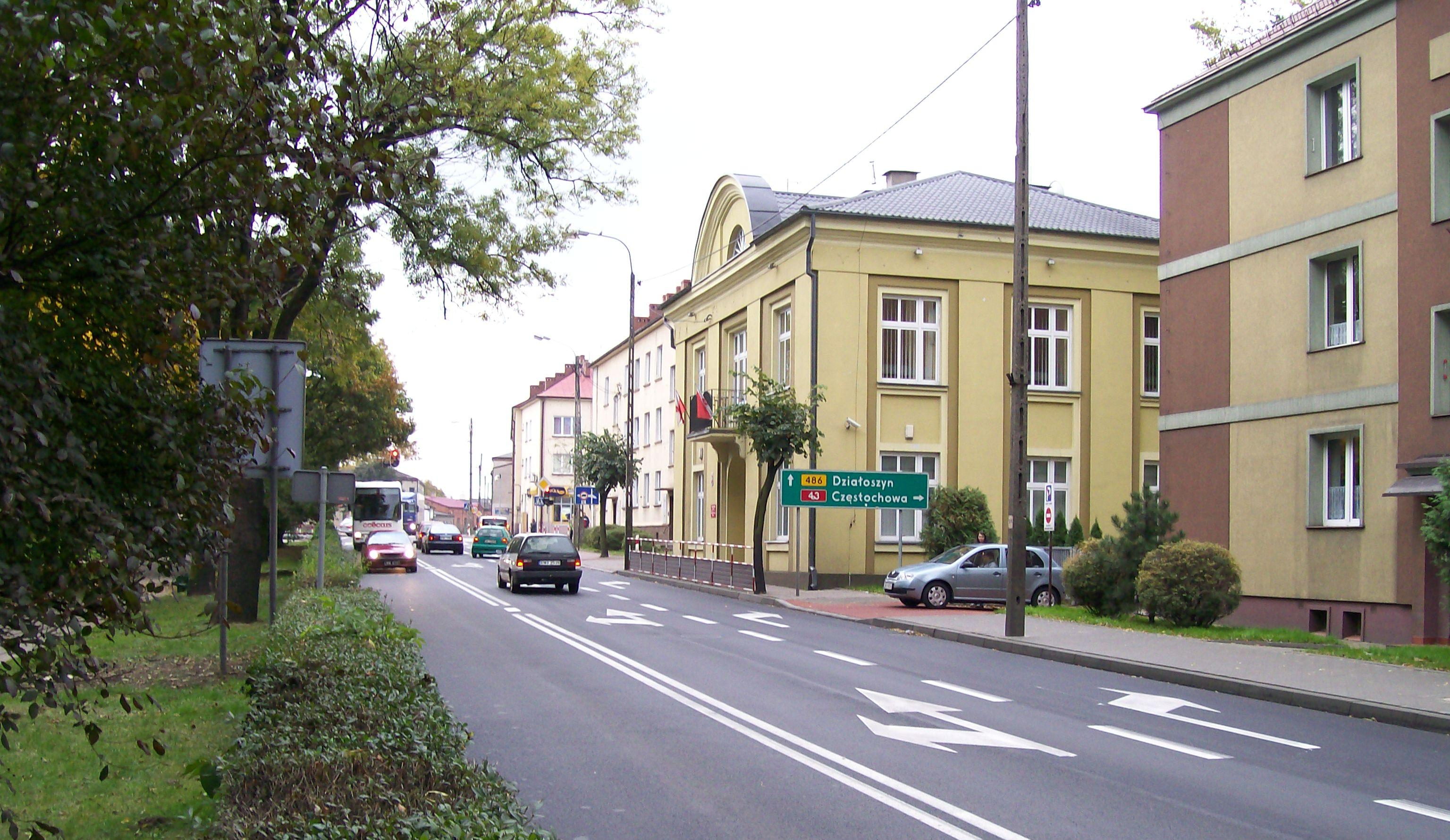
National road 43 in Wieluń

=== Railways ===
Rail connection links Wieluń to Poznań and Katowice. The line was built in the 1920s, as the junction of Kluczbork remained within borders of Weimar Germany and direct rail communication between Polish part of Upper Silesia and Poznań was impossible. Therefore, it was crucial to construct a brand new line, which runs from Herby Nowe to Kępno. The line was one of the most important connections in the Second Polish Republic, but after World War II, when Kluczbork was annexed by Poland, it lost its importance.

Also, until the end of the 1980s, there was a narrow gauge railroad, which connected Wieluń with nearby Praszka. Currently, the town has two operating railway stations: Wieluń Dąbrowa and Wieluń Miasto. Wieluń is directly connected by rail with such cities as Tarnowskie Góry, Katowice, Poznań, Szczecin and Kępno. Once there was also a direct connection to Częstochowa and Lubliniec. Another means of communication with the surroundings and the entire country are buses. There is a modern (though built in 1976) bus station, which also handles international communication.

=== Public transport ===
Wieluń, like most cities, has a municipal communications. In Wieluń runs 8 lines operated by a local transport company – PKS Wieluń. Public transportation has existed since 1988.

- Line A: Wieluń-Dąbrowa Railway Station – Rychłowice
- Line B: Gas bottling plant – Ruda
- Line C: Wieluń-Dąbrowa Railway Station – Olewin
- Line D: Kurów – Wierzchlas
- Line D – BIS: Wieluń-Dąbrowa Railway Station – POW street
- Line E: Gas bottling plant – Stare Sady housing estate
- Line G: Gas bottling plant – Częstochowska street
- Line H: Masłowice – Stare Sady housing estate

== Sports ==
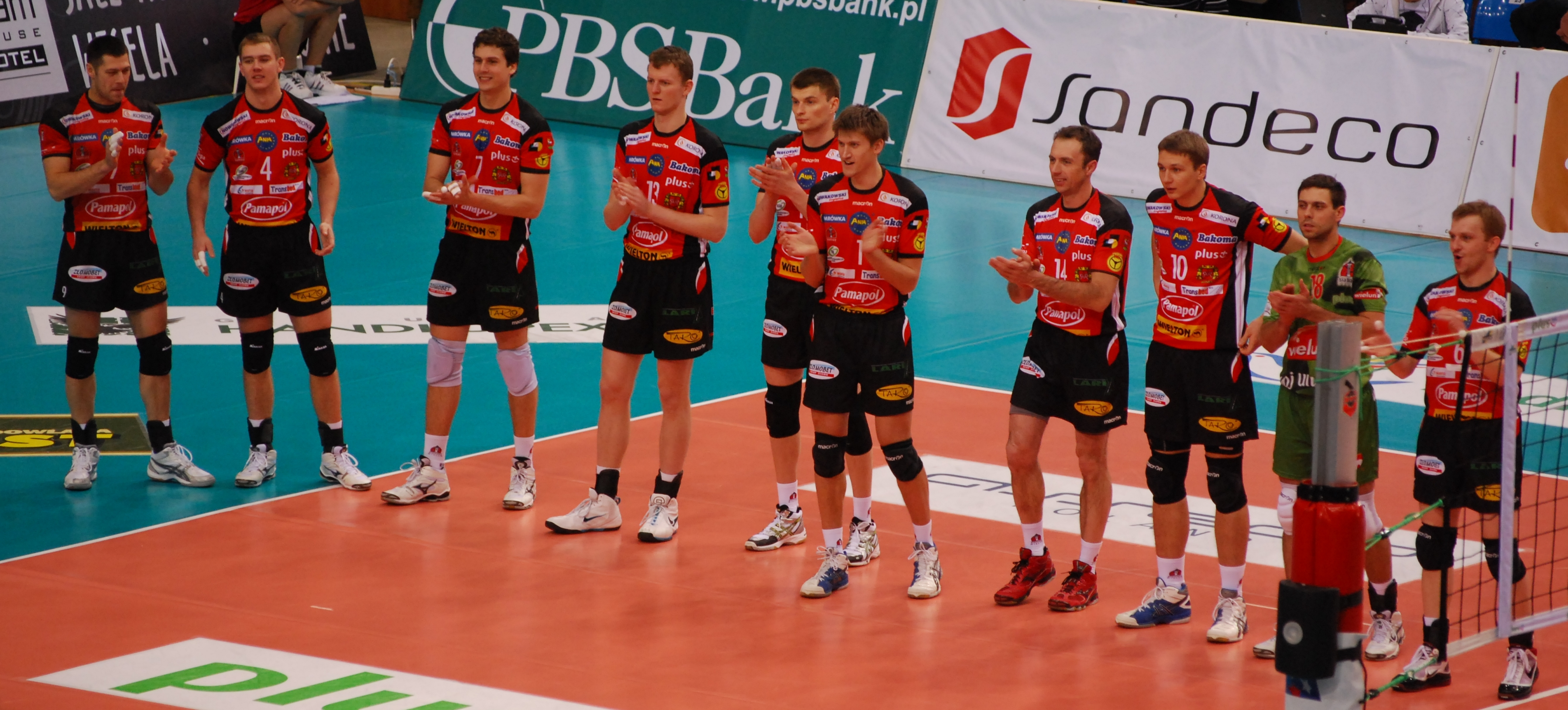
Volleyball players of Siatkarz Wieluń in the team's last season in the PlusLiga

The town has a sports club WKS Wieluń, established in 1957 after a merger of two earlier clubs. In the past, WKS Wieluń had several departments, such as track and field, basketball, table tennis, handball and association football. Currently, the only remaining department is football. Another notable club is Siatkarz Wieluń, volleyball team, which competes in the lower leagues, but in the past played in the PlusLiga, Poland's top division, most recently in the 2010–11 season.

== Notable residents ==
- Teresa Janina Kierocińska (1885–1946), nun
- Piotr Paweł Morta (born 1959), political activist, dissident, economist, co-inventor, activist in underground "Solidarity"
- Jan Wątroba (born 1953), bishop of Rzeszów
- Mariusz Wlazły (born 1983), volleyball player, World Champion

== Districts ==
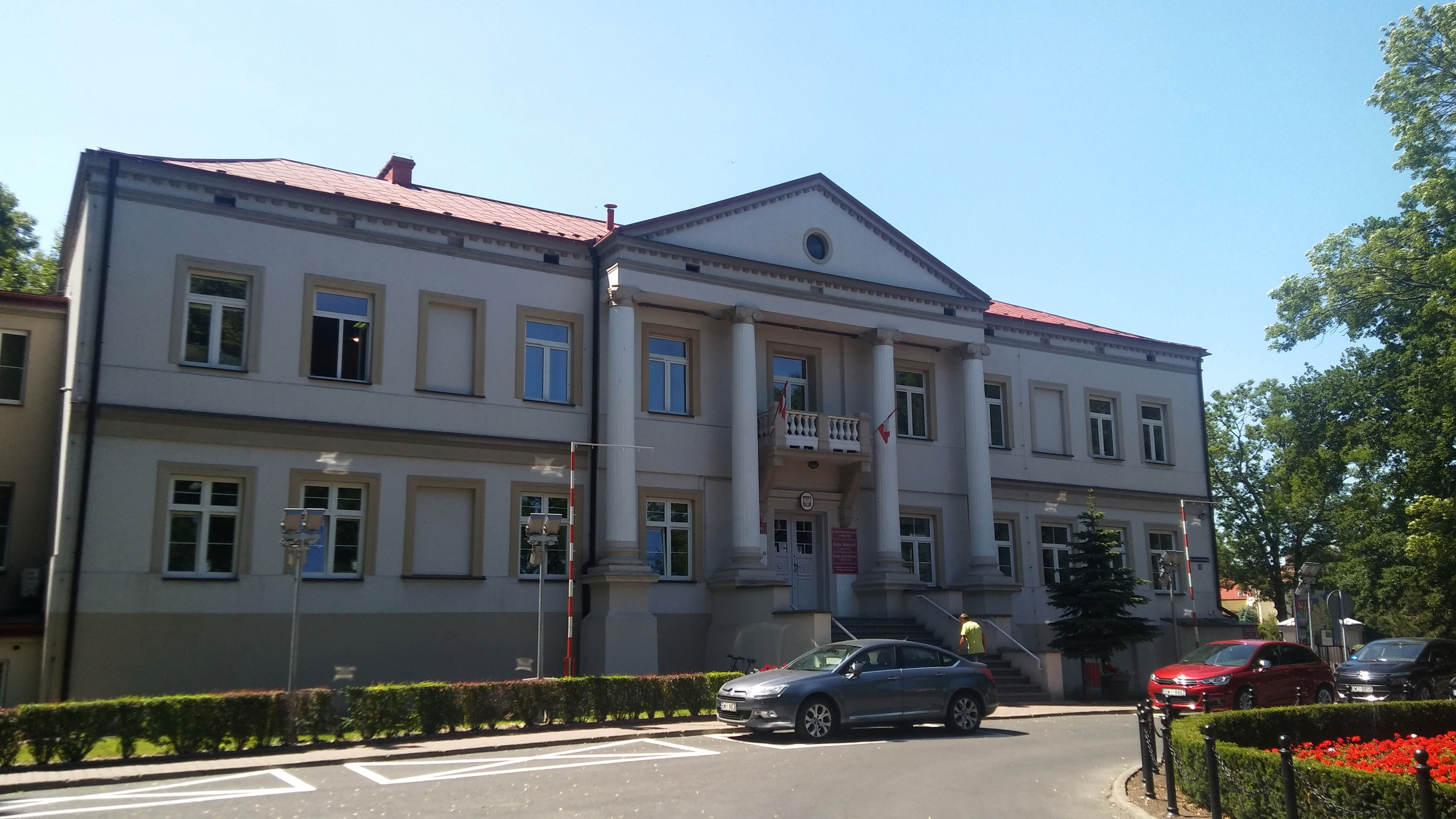
County office

- Downtown
- Armii Krajowej housing estate
- Bugaj housing estate
- Kopernika housing estate
- Stare Sady housing estate ("Old Orchards" housing estate )
- Wyszyńskiego housing estate
- Wojska Polskiego housing estate
- "Za szpitalem" (Behind Hospital housing estate)
- Niedzielsko
- Chrusty
- Berlinek
- Stodolniana housing estate
- Moniuszki housing estate
- Podszubienice
- Kijak
- Błonie

== International relations ==
=== Twin towns – Sister cities ===
Wieluń is twinned with:

- Adelebsen, Germany
- Osterburg, Germany
- Ochtrup, Germany

== See also ==
- Bombing of Wieluń in World War II
- History of the Jewish community of Wieluń
