= Yehudah Aryeh Leib Alter =

Polish Hasidic rabbi (1847–1905)

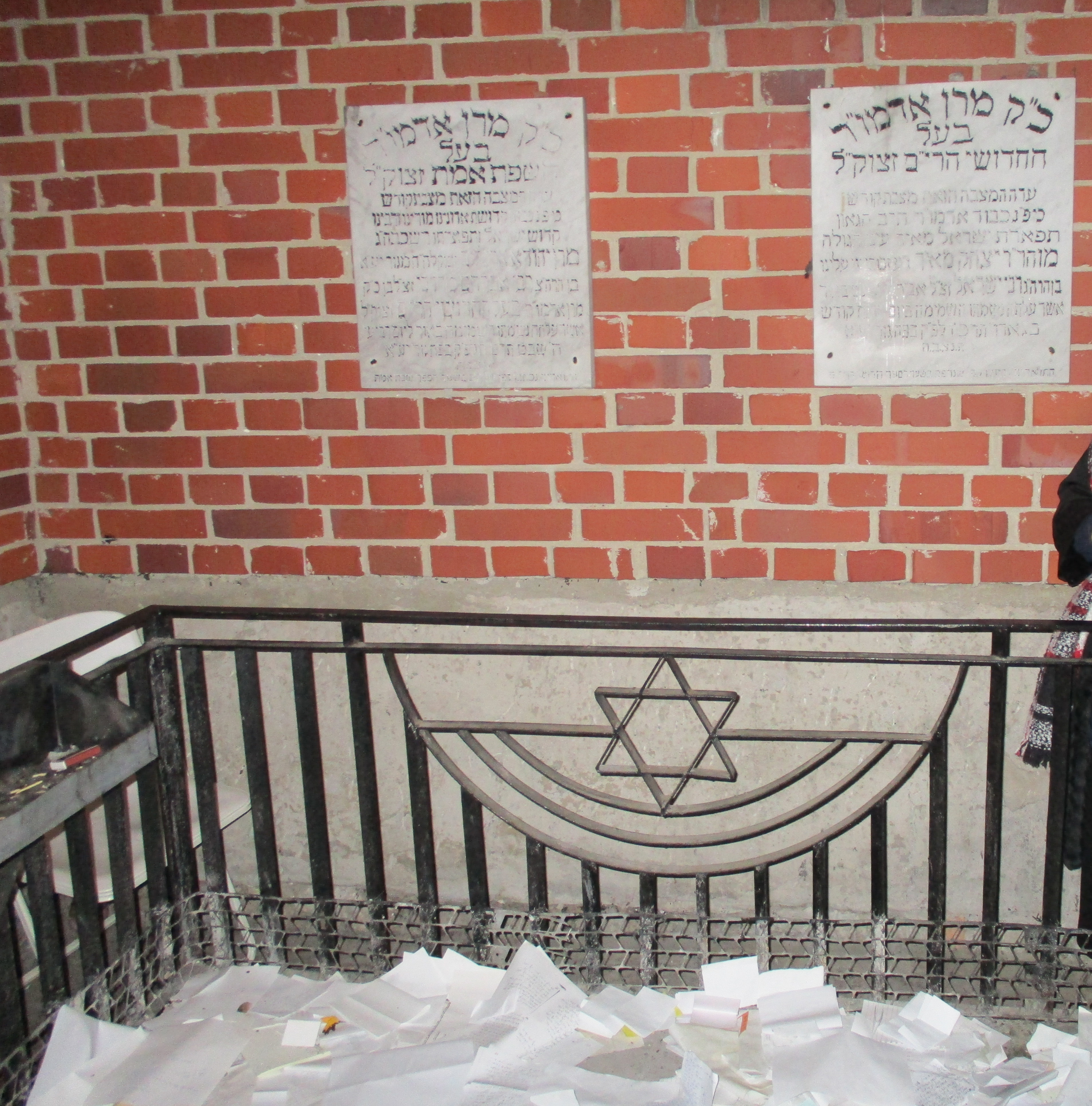
- The grave of Rabbi Yehudah Aryeh Leib Alter in Góra Kalwaria, Poland (next to him is the grave of his grandfather, Rabbi Yitzchak Meir Alter).
- Title: Gerrer Rebbe

Personal life
- Born: Yehudah Aryeh Leib Alter; 15 April 1847 Warsaw, Congress Poland, Russian Empire
- Died: 11 January 1905 (aged 57) Ger, Congress Poland, Russian Empire
- Buried: Ger, Poland; January 1905
- Spouse: Yocheved Rivka Kaminer, Reyzl Halberstam
- Children: Avraham Mordechai Alter; Yitzchak Meir Alter; Moshe Betzalel Alter; Chanokh Chayim Alter; Feyge Lewin; Yisrael Alter; Nechemya Alter; Menachem Mendel Alter; Noach Alter; Esther Biderman
- Parents: Avraham Mordechai Alter (I) (father); Ester Landsztajn (mother)
- Dynasty: Ger

Religious life
- Religion: Judaism

Jewish leader
- Predecessor: Chanoch Heynekh HaKohen of Aleksander
- Successor: Avraham Mordechai Alter
- Began: 1870
- Ended: 11 January 1905
- Main work: Sfas Emes
- Dynasty: Ger

Yehudah Aryeh Leib Alter (Hebrew: יהודה אריה ליב אלתר, 15 April 1847 – 11 January 1905), also known by the title of his main work, the Sfas Emes (Ashkenazic Pronunciation) or Sefat Emet (שפת אמת) (Modern Hebrew), was a Hasidic rabbi who succeeded his grandfather, Rabbi Yitzchak Meir Alter, as the Av beis din (head of the rabbinical court) and Rav of Góra Kalwaria, Poland (known in Yiddish as the town of Ger), and eventually as the second Rebbe of the Gerrer Hasidim, following the four-year interegnum of Rabbi Chanokh Heynekh HaKohen Levin of Aleksander.

== Biography ==
=== Early years ===
He was born in 1847 (5608) and named Yehudah Leib, he was known to family and friends as Leybl. His father, Rabbi Avraham Mordechai Alter, died when Yehudah Leib was only eight years old, and his mother Mrs. Esther Alter (née Landsztajn) died before that in 1849. Orphaned of both parents, he was brought up by his grandparents, Rabbi Yitzchak Meir Alter (known as the Chiddushei Harim) and his wife. When he was about ten years old, his grandfather took him to visit the Kotzker Rebbe, which left a lifelong impression on him.

In 1862 he married Yocheved Rivka, daughter of Yehuda Leib ("Yidl") Kaminer, descendant of the Magen Abraham. In order not to have the same name as his father-in-law, his own name was changed to Yehudah Aryeh Leib. He is said to have been attached to the name Yehudah, and was upset at not being able to use it as his name any longer.

=== Leadership ===
When his grandfather, Yitzchak Meir, died in 1866, many of the Gerrer Hasidim sought to bestow the mantle of leadership upon eighteen-year-old Yehudah Aryeh Leib. He refused that position, and leadership went to Rabbi Chanokh Heynekh HaKohen Levin of Aleksandrów Łódzki. However, after the death of the latter in 1870, the Hasidim succeeded in gaining Alter's assent to become their Rebbe. Ten children were born to Alter, of whom four sons and two daughters stayed alive after his death. The eldest among them was Rabbi Avraham Mordechai, who would later succeed him as leader.

=== Death and burial ===
On September 2, 1901, his wife, Yocheved Rivka, died. A year later, a fire consumed the Chassidic buildings in Góra Kalwaria, including Alter's home and his Beth midrash. Following this, Alter married his second wife, Reizel, the daughter of Rabbi Baruch Halberstam of Gorlice.

During the Russo-Japanese War, many of his young followers were drafted into the Russian Army and sent to the battlefields in Manchuria. Alter was very worried over these devotees and would constantly write to them. His health suffered, and he died at the age of 57 on 11 January 1905 (5 Shevat 5665).

When news of the Admor's petirah (passing away) spread, so many people rushed to Ger yesterday morning that although the railway dispatched extra trains there was hardly any space in the cars and thousands of people were still left without means to travel...

One (tram) car with seating for 44 people held over 200, not even leaving any standing room, and in another car some people fainted as a result of the overcrowded conditions...

When the time for tefillas Mincha arrived, all of the funeral-goers, 20,000 in number, stood in a field and davened Minchah together...

The brief words spoken by the Rav of Sochachov made a powerful impression.

— source

=== Succession ===
Alter was succeeded as Gerrer Rebbe by his son, Rabbi Avraham Mordechai Alter. Most of Gerrer hasidim followed Avraham Mordechai, but some chasidim followed the brother-in-law of Alter - Rabbi Pinchas Menachem Justman of Piltz.

== Lasting influence ==
Alter was one of the greatest Torah scholars of his generation, teaching students such as Rabbi Nachman Shlomo Greenspan and many others. His output was prodigious, and his works (all entitled Sfas Emes) deal with the Talmud, the ethics of the Midrash, and mysticism of the Zohar.

His Torah homilies as delivered to his hasidim, and arranged according to the weekly parashah and the festivals, were the first to be published posthumously under the name Sfas Emes (שפת אמת). The title was taken from the closing words of the final piece he wrote (Sfas Emes, Vayechi 5665). His chiddushim (original Torah thoughts) on many Talmudic tractates, and on Yoreh De'ah, have been published under the same name.

The Sochatchover Rebbe, Rabbi Avrohom Bornsztain (known as the Avnei Nezer), a leading Torah scholar and posek in his own right, is said to have maintained two bookcases — one for Rishonim (earlier commentators) and another for Acharonim (later commentators). The volumes of the Sfas Emes, written in the late 1800s, were to be found in his bookcase containing the Rishonim. To study some portions of the Talmud without the Sfas Emes is unthinkable to the modern-day scholar.

The Sfas Emes Yeshiva in Jerusalem is named after him and includes his teachings in the curriculum.

=== His sayings ===
One of the greatest religious problems is that people fear having a relationship with God and consequently distance themselves from Him. Just as angels serve God without fear despite their lower status in comparison to God, so too human beings should take their model (walk amongst them) and not be afraid of developing a relationship with God and serving Him. This represents a wholeness that we as human beings are capable of only if we think of ourselves as walking amongst angels.

— Sfas Emes, Parshat Beha'alotecha 5636

== Bibliography ==
- Arthur Green, The Language of Truth: The Torah Commentary of Sefat Emet (Jewish Publication Society, 1998) ISBN 978-0827609464.
- Avraham Segal, "On 'Renewal' in the Writings of R. Yehudah Aryeh Leib of Gur and his Successors" (Heb.), Daat: A Journal of Jewish Philosophy & Kabbalah, 70 (2011), pp. 49-80 JSTOR https://www.jstor.org/stable/24232408.
- Levin, Yehuda Leib (1977). The Rebbes of Gur: The History of Their Lives and Work (in Hebrew). Jerusalem: Ha-Modia.
- Articles by Dr. Yoram Jacobson:
  - "Exile and Redemption in Gur Hasidism" (Heb.), Da'at, 2-3 (1978–1979), pp. 175–215 JSTOR https://www.jstor.org/stable/24184707.
  - "Truth and Faith in Gur Hasidic Thought" (Heb.), in: Joseph Dan (ed.) Studies in Jewish Mysticism, Philosophy and Ethical Literature Presented to Isaiah Tishby, Jerusalem: Magnes Press, 1986, pp. 593–616.
  - "The Sanctity of the Mundane in the Hasidic School of Gur - Studies in the Understanding of the Sabbath in the Homilies of Sefat Emet" (Heb.), in: Hasidism in Poland, Jerusalem, 1994, pp. 241–277.
  - "From Youth to Leadership and from Kabbalah to Hasidism - Stages in the Spiritual Development of the Author of Sefat Emet" (Heb.), in: Rachel Elior and Joseph Dan (ed.) Many voices: Rivka Schatz Uffenheimer Memorial Volume, II, Jerusalem: Magnes Press, 1996, pp. 429–446 JSTOR https://www.jstor.org/stable/23364562.
  - "Primordial Chaos and Creation in the Thought of Gur Hasidism, or: the Sabbath that Preceded Creation" (Polish), in Duchowosc Zydowska w Polsce, Kraków, 2000, pp. 151–171.
