= Yitzchak Meir Alter =

Rebbe of the Hasidic dynasty

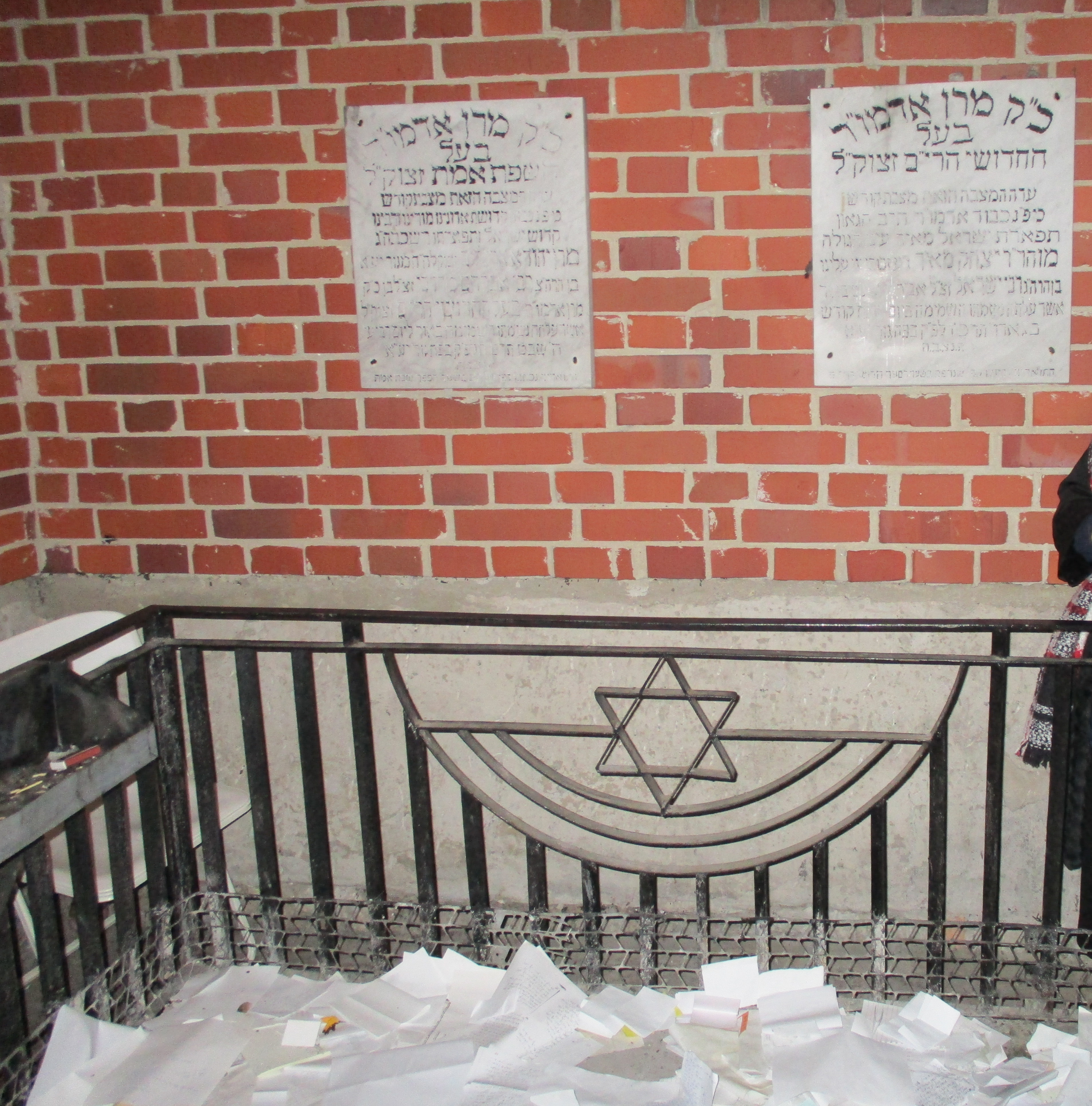
- The grave of Rabbi Yitzchak Meir Alter in Góra Kalwaria, Poland (next to him is the grave of his grandson, Rabbi Yehudah Aryeh Leib Alter).
- Title: Gerrer Rebbe

Personal life
- Born: Yitzchak Meir Rotenberg-Alter; 1799 Magnuszew, West Galicia
- Died: 10 March 1866 (aged 66–67) Góra Kalwaria, Congress Poland
- Buried: Góra Kalwaria, Poland
- Spouse: Feigele Lipszyc
- Children: Avraham Mordechai; Cyna Pesia; Leah Hudes; Esther
- Dynasty: Ger

Religious life
- Religion: Judaism

Jewish leader
- Predecessor: none
- Successor: Chanokh Heynekh HaKohen Levin of Aleksander
- Main work: Chiddushei Harim
- Dynasty: Ger

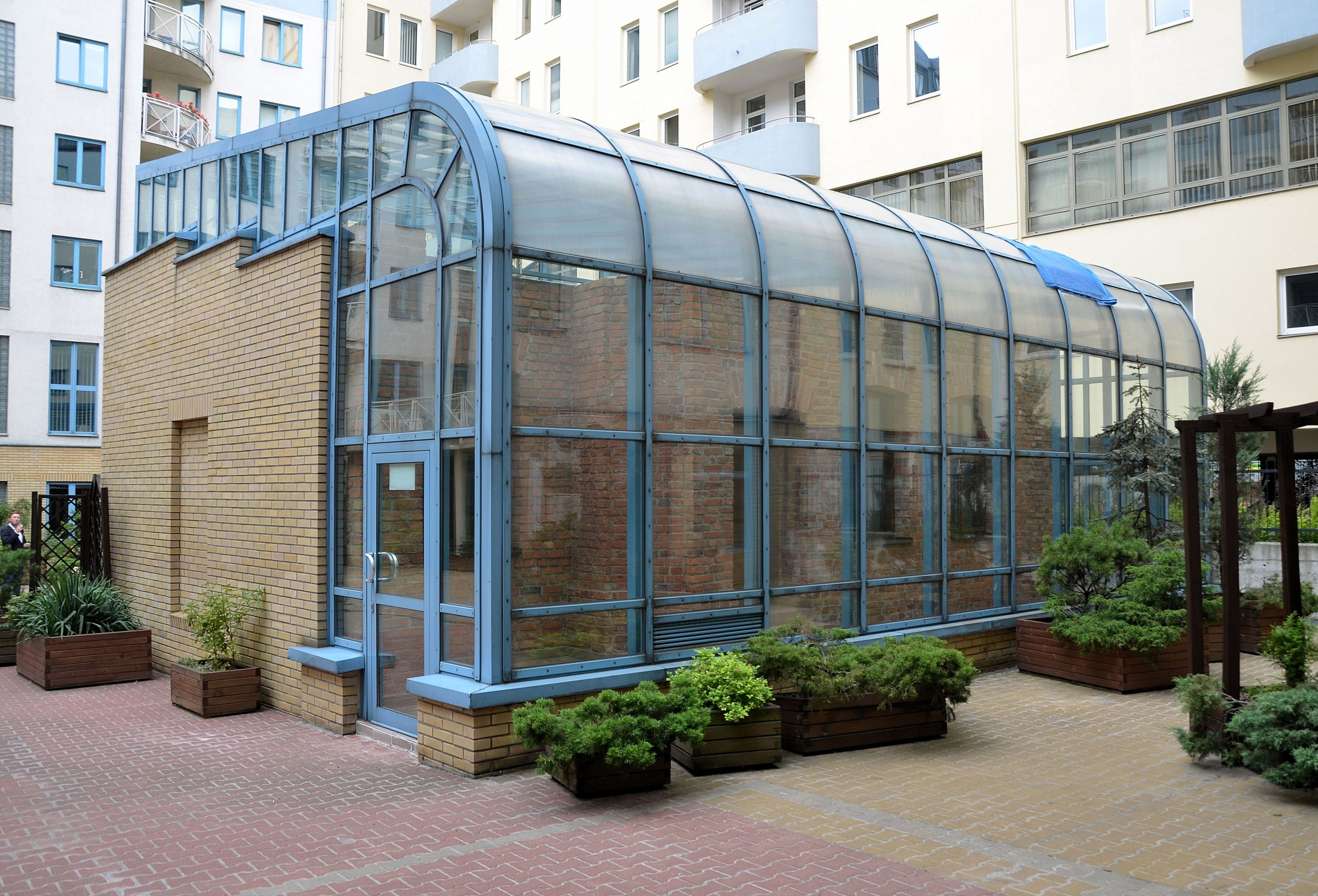
Preserved part of the Jewish House of Religious Studies and Prayer at 57 Żelazna Street in Warsaw which housed the Yitzchak Meir Alter synagogue

Yitzchak Meir Rotenberg-Alter (Yiddish: יצחק מאיר אלטער, Polish: Icchak Meir Rothenberg Alter, Hebrew: יצחק מאיר אלתר) (1799 – 10 March 1866), was the first Rebbe of the Ger Hasidic dynasty, which he founded in the town of Góra Kalwaria (known as "Ger" in Yiddish), Poland. He headed the Kupath Rabbi Meir Baal Haness Kollel Polen (Poland) Varsha (Warsaw) (Hebrew קופת רמבעה"ן כולל פולין ורשה / וארשא). He was also known as The Chiddushei HaRim (החדושי הרי"ם) for his Torah writings, and was sometimes fondly called Reb Itche Meir (Yiddish) by his followers.

== Biography ==
Alter was born in Magnuszew, Austrian Poland, in late 1799. He came from a very distinguished family of rabbis, among the most prominent in Germany and Poland. He was a descendant of Rashi and of the Tosafist, Rabbi Meir ben Baruch of Rothenburg. In 1830, he was forced to change his name from “Rosenberg” to Alter because of his support towards the Poles during the November Uprising.

Alter became known as a Talmudic gaon. At first, he was close to the rebbes of Kozhnitz, however after some years, he was drawn to Rebbe Simcha Bunim of Peshischa, whose close adherent he became. After the demise of Simcha Bunim, Alter became a disciple of Rabbi Menachem Mendel of Kotzk, also known as the Kotzker Rebbe, who was famous for his acerbic wit and Talmudic brilliance.

After the passing of the Kotzker Rebbe in 1859, an overwhelming majority of the latter’s disciples chose Alter as their new Rebbe, thus founding the Gerrer Hasidic Dynasty. Although after Alter’s passing 1866, Rabbi Chanoch Henoch of Aleksander succeeded him in his position and transferred the Chasidic center to the city of Alexander. Four years later, Rabbi Alexander died, and then Alter's grandson, Yehudah Aryeh Leib Alter, known as "Sfas Emes" (the son of Avraham Mordechai), became the new Rebbe of the overwhelming majority of his grandfather’s followers. All of the future Rebbes of Ger have been Alter’s descendants.

== Family ==
Alter married Feigele Lipszyc, daughter of Moshe 'Halfon' Lipszyc, in 1811, and settled in Warsaw. They had fourteen children, according to most published sources, most of whom died in infancy. One of his sons, Avraham Mordechai, and three daughters, Cyna Pesia, Leah Hudes, and Esther, survived to adulthood and married. However, by the time of Alter's death on 23 Adar 5626 (1866), only one child (Esther) remained alive.

Alter and his Rebbe, the Kotzker Rebbe, became brothers-in-law, when the latter married Chaya Lipszyc, the sister of Alter's wife Feigele.

== Works ==
Rabbi Alter is still well known for his talmudic commentary, though he wrote on many other areas. Extant published works are:

- Chiddushei HaRim on Choshen Mishpat Part 1 Part 3
- Chiddushei HaRim on Torah link
- Chiddushei HaRim on Bava Batra link
- Chiddushei HaRim on Bava Metzia link
- Chiddushei HaRim on Bava Kama link
- Chiddushei HaRim on Shavuot link
- Chiddushei HaRim on Gittin link
- Chiddushei HaRim on Kiddushin link
- Chiddushei HaRim on Ketubot link
- Chiddushei HaRim on Pirkei Avot link

== Sources ==
- Meir Einei Hagoilo, by Avrohom Yisochor Binyomin Alter and Avrohom Mordechai Alter, (1928)
- Toldoth Horim, by Itshe Myer Broder of Ger.
- No. 100, Elul 5727, page 80 בית יעקב, פנחס יעקב הכהן לוין
- Levin, Yehuda Leib (1977). The Rebbes of Gur: The History of Their Lives and Work (in Hebrew). Jerusalem: Ha-Modia.
