= Osiny =

Osiny may refer to:

- Osiny, Bełchatów County in Łódź Voivodeship (central Poland)
- Osiny, Brzeziny County in Łódź Voivodeship (central Poland)
- Osiny, Łask County in Łódź Voivodeship (central Poland)
- Osiny, Łowicz County in Łódź Voivodeship (central Poland)
- Osiny, Łuków County in Lublin Voivodeship (east Poland)
- Osiny, Gmina Chodel in Lublin Voivodeship (east Poland)
- Osiny, Puławy County in Lublin Voivodeship (east Poland)
- Osiny, Kielce County in Świętokrzyskie Voivodeship (south-central Poland)
- Osiny, Starachowice County in Świętokrzyskie Voivodeship (south-central Poland)
- Osiny, Włoszczowa County in Świętokrzyskie Voivodeship (south-central Poland)
- Osiny, Gostynin County in Masovian Voivodeship (east-central Poland)
- Osiny, Grodzisk County in Masovian Voivodeship (east-central Poland)
- Osiny, Grójec County in Masovian Voivodeship (east-central Poland)
- Osiny, Mińsk County in Masovian Voivodeship (east-central Poland)
- Osiny, Siedlce County in Masovian Voivodeship (east-central Poland)
- Osiny, Wyszków County in Masovian Voivodeship (east-central Poland)
- Osiny, Zwoleń County in Masovian Voivodeship (east-central Poland)
- Osiny, Kępno County in Greater Poland Voivodeship (west-central Poland)
- Osiny, Słupca County in Greater Poland Voivodeship (west-central Poland)
- Osiny, Częstochowa County in Silesian Voivodeship (south Poland)
- Osiny, Gmina Mykanów in Silesian Voivodeship (south Poland)
- Osiny, Wodzisław County in Silesian Voivodeship (south Poland)
- Osiny, Opole Voivodeship (south-west Poland)
