= Biel family with Ostoja coat of arms =

Polish medieval CoA Ostoja

The Biel family - a Polish noble family with the Ostoja coat of arms, belonging to the heraldic Clan Ostoja (Moscics) originating from Błeszno (now a district of Częstochowa in the southern part of the city).

== The oldest source certificates concerning the family ==
- The first representative of the Biel family, of the Ostoja coat of arms, confirmed in sources, was Abel Biel, who in 1373 bought the village of Kakawa from Bieńek of Skowronów and his son Marcin. This transaction was confirmed by prince Władysław Opolczyk on March 23 this year.
- On January 20, 1377, Abel Biel was mentioned as a burgrave from Wieluń on the document of the Opole-Wieluń head, Hinczka Czambora.
- In 1832, Henryk Biel from Błeszno performed as a parson in Stara Częstochowa. That year, he resigned with the consent of the Bishop of Krakow, Jan Radlica, in the presence of Prince Władysław Opolczyk from the parish church of the Blessed Virgin Mary in Częstochowa in favor of the Pauline Fathers brought from Hungary. The parish was moved to the branch church of St. Zygmunt in Częstochowa. From 1387, Henryk Biel acted as a canon of Gniezno.
- On October 21, 1382, Abel Biel was recorded as a witness on the foundation document in Wyszogród. At that time, he was the head of Inowrocław. Biel assumed this office after the takeover of Kujawy Inowrocław by prince Władysław Opolczyk. In 1383 he was settling a dispute between the Nieszawa commander Rüdger von Ostischau and Waszek from Marków, the Bydgoszcz standard bearer and knights from Branno. In the 90s of the 14th century he acted as the head of Klepice.
- In 1407, Piotr, Bishop of Kraków, approved a document issued by Abel Biel from Błeszno, according to which Biel founded and endowed the parish church in Biała Wielka.

== The estates belonging to the family ==
Listed below are the most important land properties belonging to Biel of the Ostoja coat of arms.

Błeszno, Kakawa (like Kokawa), Wrzosowa, Biała Mała i Wielka, Wilkowiecko, Kamyk, Libidza, Mierzanów (a mill settlement, a village that does not exist today), Stare Borowno (like Kuźnica Kiedrzyńska), Kuźnica Błeszyńska (like Słowik), Kiedrzyn, Jaworzno.

== Family representatives ==
- Abel Biel from Błeszno (died after 1414) - heir of the following estates: Błeszno, Kakawa, Wrzosowa, Biała Mała and Wielka, Wilkowiecko, Kamyk, Libidza and others, burgrave of Wieluń, head of Inowrocław, head of Kepice, chamberlain of Wieluń.
- Henryk Biel from Błeszno (died after 1424) - a canon of Gniezno, rector of Częstochowa. He was the brother of Abel Biel from Błeszno, coat of arms Ostoja. He was mentioned by Kasper Niesiecki in Herbarz Polski.
- Mikołaj Biel from Błeszno (died before 1432) - heir of Błeszno, Biała Wielka, Wilkowiecka, Kamyk and Kiedrzyna. He was the son of Abel Biel from Błeszno, coat of arms Ostoja.
- Henryk Biel from Błeszno called Indrzyc (died after 1442) - heir of Błeszno, courtier and messenger of king Władysław Jagiełło. He was the son of Abel Biel from Błeszno, coat of arms Ostoja.
- Zygmunt Biel from Błeszno (died after 1453) - heir of Biała Mała, Libidza and Jaworzno in the Wieluń region. He was the son of Abel Biel from Błeszno, coat of arms Ostoja.
- Mikołaj Biel condam de Blaschno (died after 1456) - came from Błeszno, he was the son of Henryk Biel from Błeszno. It was certified in 1456
- Stanisław Biel (died after 1420) - who did not write from Błeszno, appears in sources simultaneously with Mikołaj, Henryk and Zygmunt Bielami.

== The legend of the castle in Błeszno ==
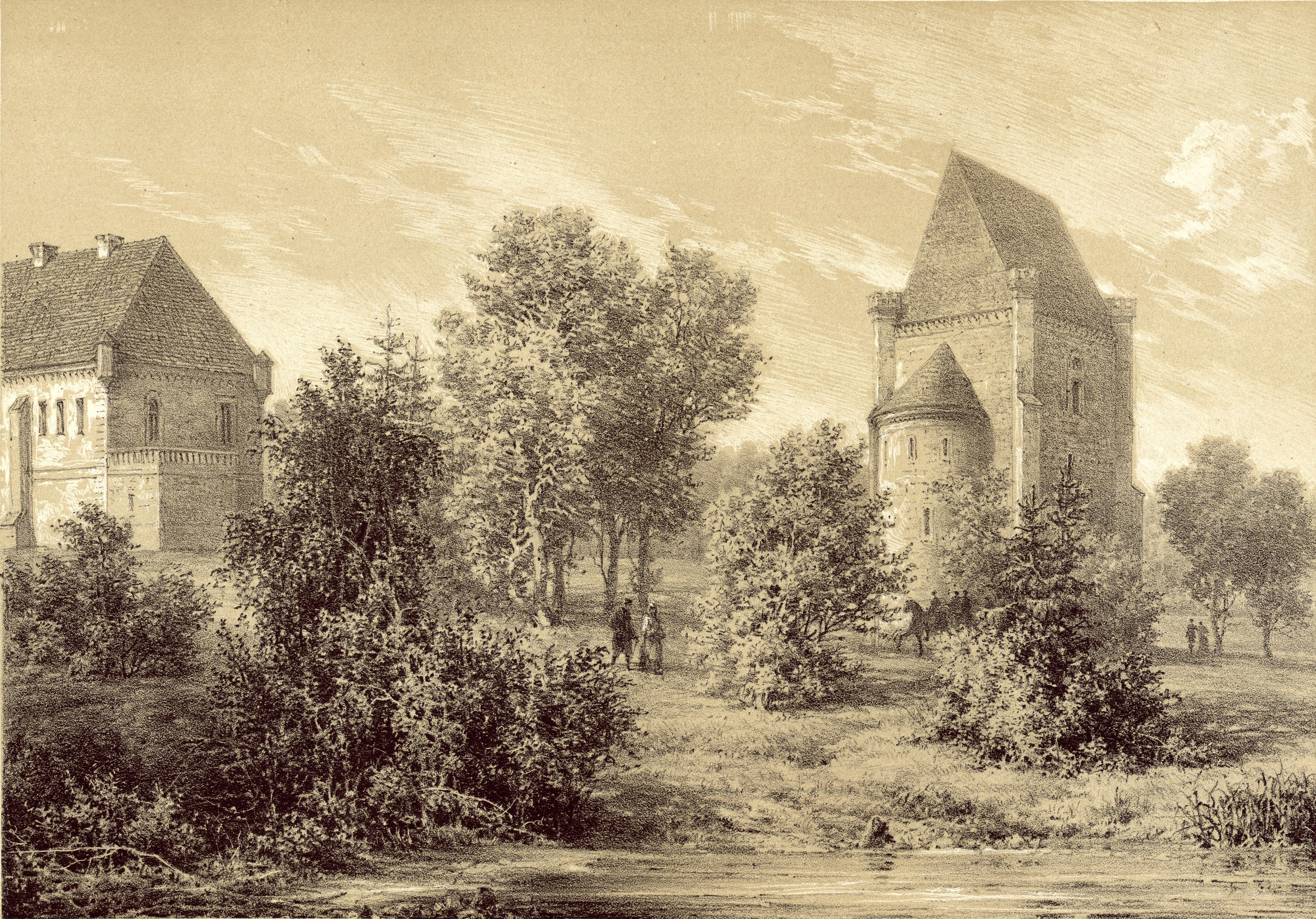
An example of a residential tower

The castle in Błeszno was most likely erected by Abel Biel, which is recorded in the sources in the years 1373–1414. Archaeological research and modest source descriptions show that the main element of the fortifications was a stone residential tower. The oldest records about this object come from the 15th century. Today, only the elements of the earth mound remain after this castle-tower in the wet area in the southern part of Błeszno. Even today, a living legend related to this castle is known among the oldest inhabitants of Błeszno. It was described and published by Juliana Zinkowa in the work entitled Legends and legends of the Jurassic route. The author in this study wrote as follows:

There was a large castle near Błeszno. It was held by a rich knight. He maintained a detachment of his own army, with which he set off on military expeditions more than once at the call of the king. Many courtiers were also seasoned for military service. There was a separate chapel in the castle, to which the gentleman would often go and sink in fervent prayer. Everyone considered him extremely pious. Once, however, a serious disagreement arose between him and the king, and they quarreled with each other. The knight revolted against the king. He sent a large army unit to tame the rebel. The knight faced him with all the strength he could. There was an armed clash in which the owner of the castle became the winner. Then he became proud and declared that he was equal to God in the eyes of his soldiers and of the captive royal captives. At that moment, the earth opened wide and engulfed the castle and all its inhabitants, and the whole area was flooded with water and a boggy swamp was formed. Flames roamed over this quagmire on dark nights. It was said that they were the souls of the blasphemous knight and his servants.

== See also ==
- Ostoja coat of arms
- Clan Ostoja (Moscics)

== Bibliography ==
- K. Niesiecki, Herbarz polski, wyd. J.N. Bobrowicz, Lipsk 1839–1845, t. VII, s. 173.
- A. Boniecki, Herbarz polski, Warszawa 1889–1913, t. I, s. 212.
- S. Uruski, Rodzina. Herbarz szlachty polskiej, Warszawa 1904–1931, t. I, s. 174.
- J. Laberschek, Bielowie herbu Ostoja i ich zamek w Błesznie na tle polityki obronnej panujących w drugiej połowie XIV wieku, [w:] Zeszyty Historyczne, T. 1, Częstochowa 1993, s. 291–306.
- J. Laberschek, Częstochowa i jej okolice w średniowieczu, Kraków 2006, s. 97, 99, 117–121, 125–138, 151.
- J. Korytkowski, Prałaci i kanonicy katedry metropolitalnej gnieźnieńskiej od roku 1000 aż do dni naszych. Podług źródeł archiwalnych, Gniezno 1883, T. 1, s. 119–120.
- J. Sperka, Otoczenie Władysława Opolczyka w latach 1370-1401, Katowice 2006, s. 175–177.
- T. Jurek (red.), Słownik historyczno-geograficzny ziem polskich w średniowieczu, Instytut Historii Polskiej Akademii Nauk, Kraków, część I-IV, 2010–2019.
