= Florków =

- Village
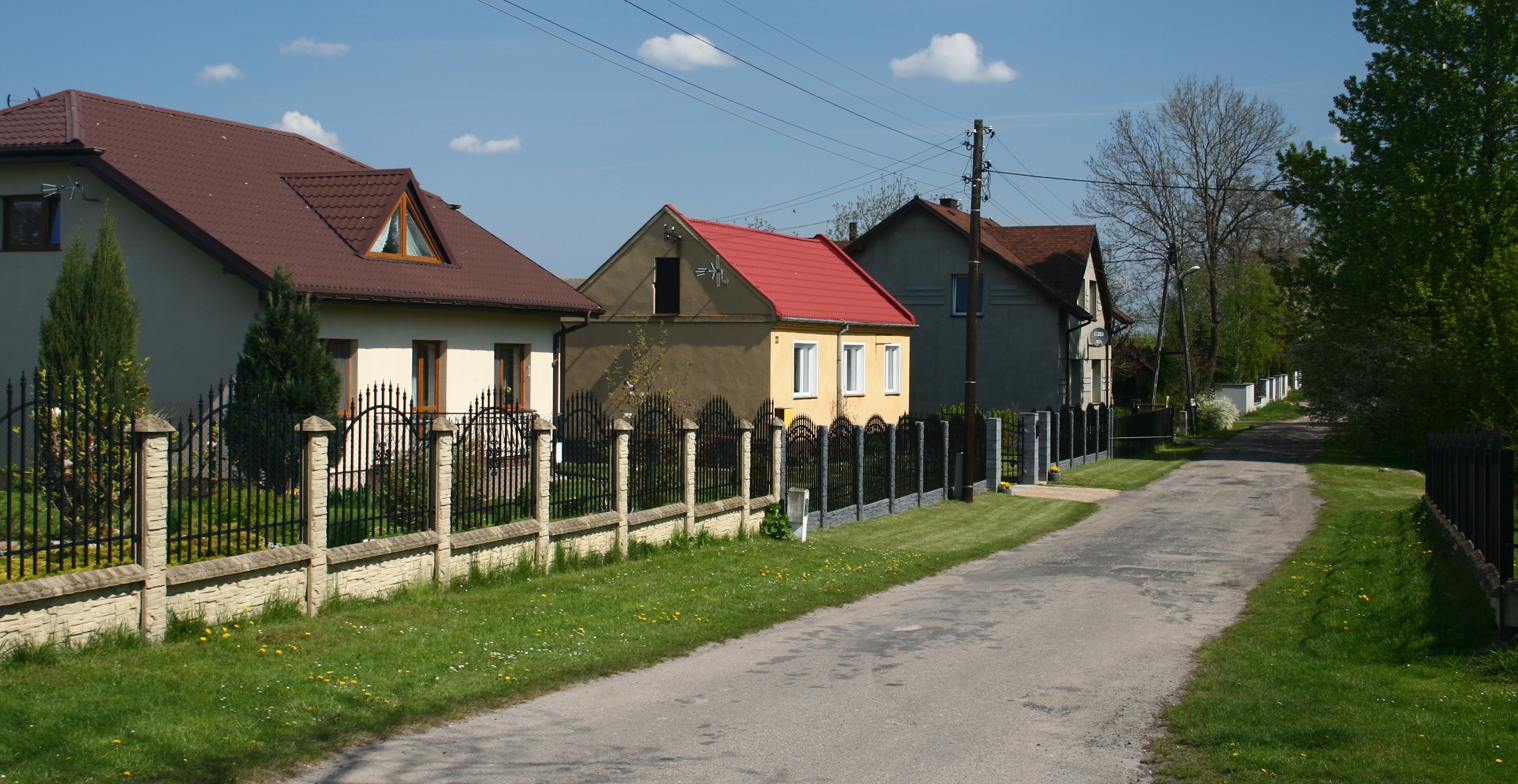

- Location within Poland
- Coordinates: 50°53′0″N 19°8′38″E
- Country: Poland
- Voivodeship: Silesian
- County: Częstochowa
- Gmina: Mykanów
- Population: 96

Florków (Polish pronunciation: [ˈflɔrkuf]) is a village in the administrative district of Gmina Mykanów, within Częstochowa County, Silesian Voivodeship, in southern Poland.
