= Dudki, Silesian Voivodeship =

Dudki
- Village
- Location within Poland
- Coordinates: 50°54′16″N 19°8′55″E
- Country: Poland
- Voivodeship: Silesian
- County: Częstochowa
- Gmina: Mykanów
- Population: 86

Dudki [ˈdutki] is a village in the administrative district of Gmina Mykanów, within Częstochowa County, Silesian Voivodeship, in southern Poland.
