= Kościelec, Silesian Voivodeship =

Kościelec
- Village
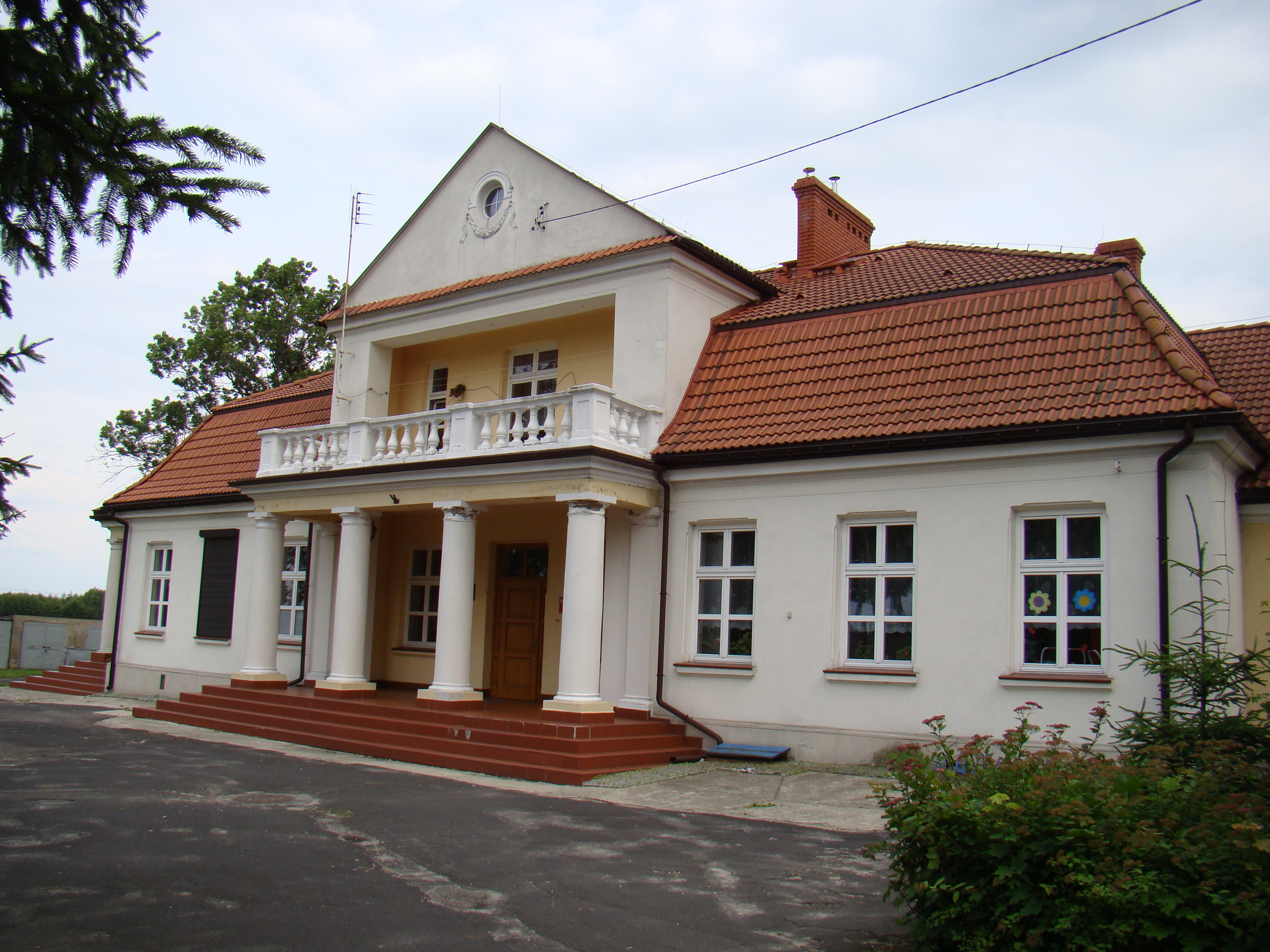
- Manor house

- Location within Poland
- Coordinates: 50°53′48″N 19°12′55″E
- Country: Poland
- Voivodeship: Silesian
- County: Częstochowa
- Gmina: Rędziny
- Population: 1,706

Kościelec [kɔɕˈt͡ɕɛlɛt͡s] is a village in the administrative district of Gmina Rędziny, within Częstochowa County, Silesian Voivodeship, in southern Poland.
