= Lubojna =

- Village
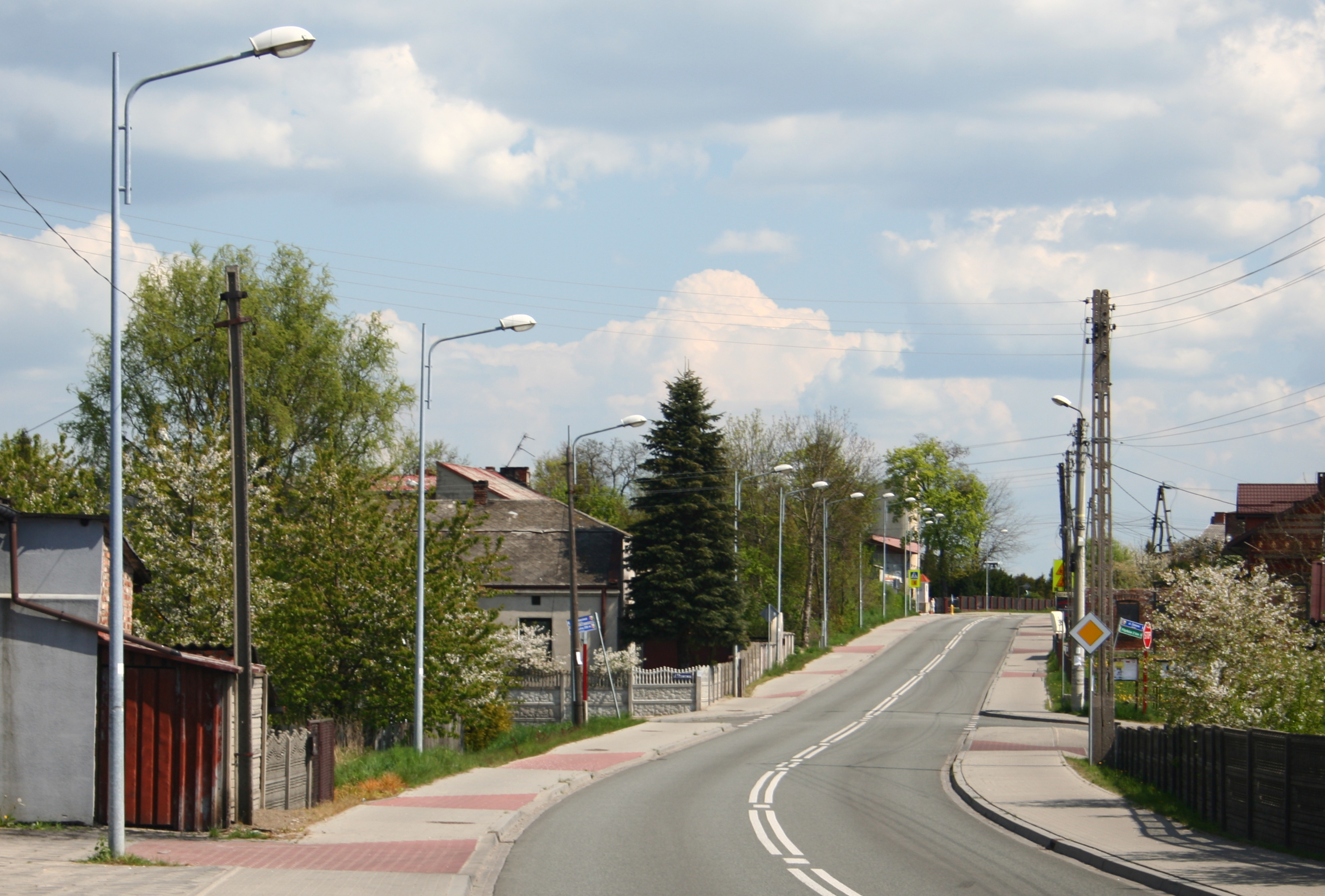

- Location within Poland
- Coordinates: 50°53′N 19°7′E
- Country: Poland
- Voivodeship: Silesian
- County: Częstochowa
- Gmina: Mykanów
- Population: 512

Lubojna [luˈbɔi̯na] is a village in the administrative district of Gmina Mykanów, within Częstochowa County, Silesian Voivodeship, in southern Poland.
