= Rudnik Wielki =

- Village
- Location within Poland
- Coordinates: 50°39′N 19°5′E
- Country: Poland
- Voivodeship: Silesian
- County: Częstochowa
- Gmina: Kamienica Polska
- Population: 862

Rudnik Wielki (Polish pronunciation: [ˈrudɲik ˈfjɛlkʲi]) is a village in the administrative district of Gmina Kamienica Polska, within Częstochowa County, Silesian Voivodeship, in southern Poland.
