= Cykarzew Północny =

- Village
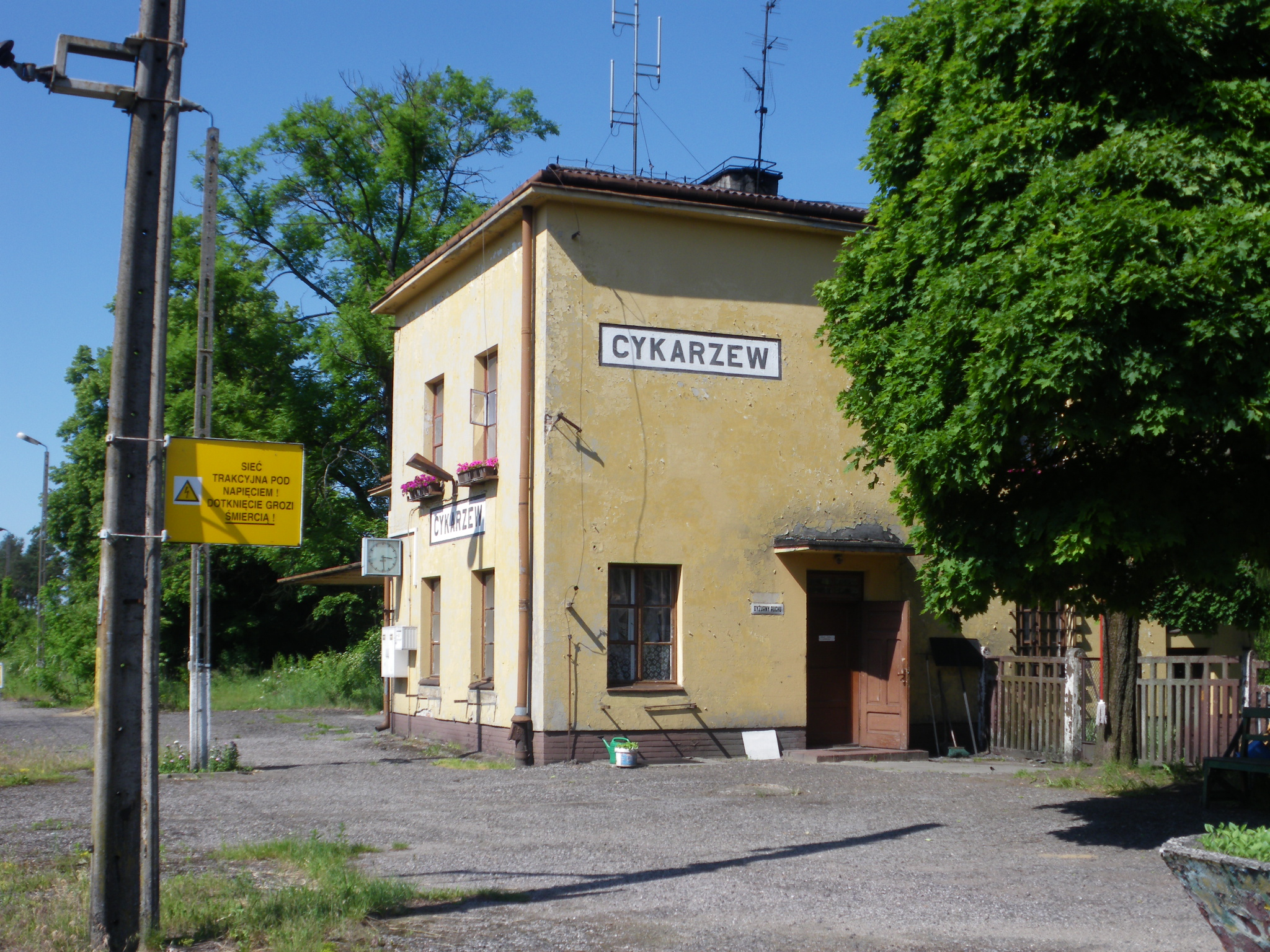
- Railway station

- Location within Poland
- Coordinates: 50°57′N 19°9′E
- Country: Poland
- Voivodeship: Silesian
- County: Częstochowa
- Gmina: Mykanów
- Population: 859

Cykarzew Północny [t͡sɨˈkaʐɛf puu̯ˈnɔt͡snɨ] is a village in the administrative district of Gmina Mykanów, within Częstochowa County, Silesian Voivodeship, in southern Poland.
