= Zielone Górki =

- Village
- Location within Poland
- Coordinates: 50°38′18″N 19°03′57″E
- Country: Poland
- Voivodeship: Silesian
- County: Częstochowa
- Gmina: Starcza

Zielone Górki (Polish pronunciation: [ʑɛˈlɔnɛ ˈɡurkʲi]) is a village in the administrative district of Gmina Starcza, within Częstochowa County, Silesian Voivodeship, in southern Poland.
