= Łazy, Częstochowa County =

Łazy
- Village
- Location within Poland
- Coordinates: 50°40′49″N 19°03′28″E
- Country: Poland
- Voivodeship: Silesian
- County: Częstochowa
- Gmina: Starcza

Łazy [ˈwazɨ] is a village in the administrative district of Gmina Starcza, within Częstochowa County, Silesian Voivodeship, in southern Poland.
