= Łysiec, Silesian Voivodeship =

Łysiec
- Village
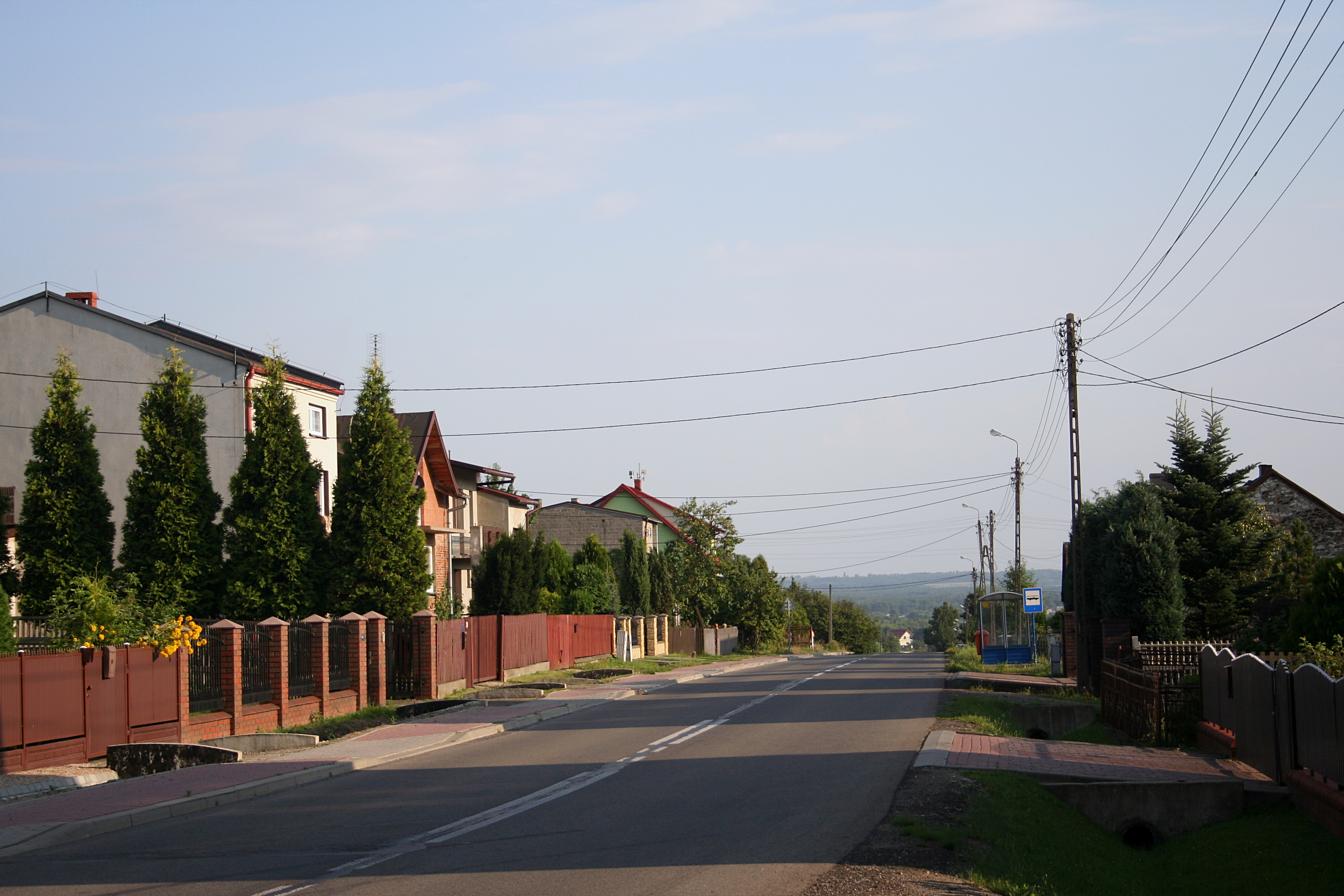

- Location within Poland
- Coordinates: 50°41′N 19°4′E
- Country: Poland
- County: Częstochowa
- Gmina: Starcza
- Population: 384

Łysiec [ˈwɨɕɛt͡s] is a village in the administrative district of Gmina Starcza, within Częstochowa County, in southern Poland.
