= Rudniki, Gmina Rędziny =

Rudniki
- Village
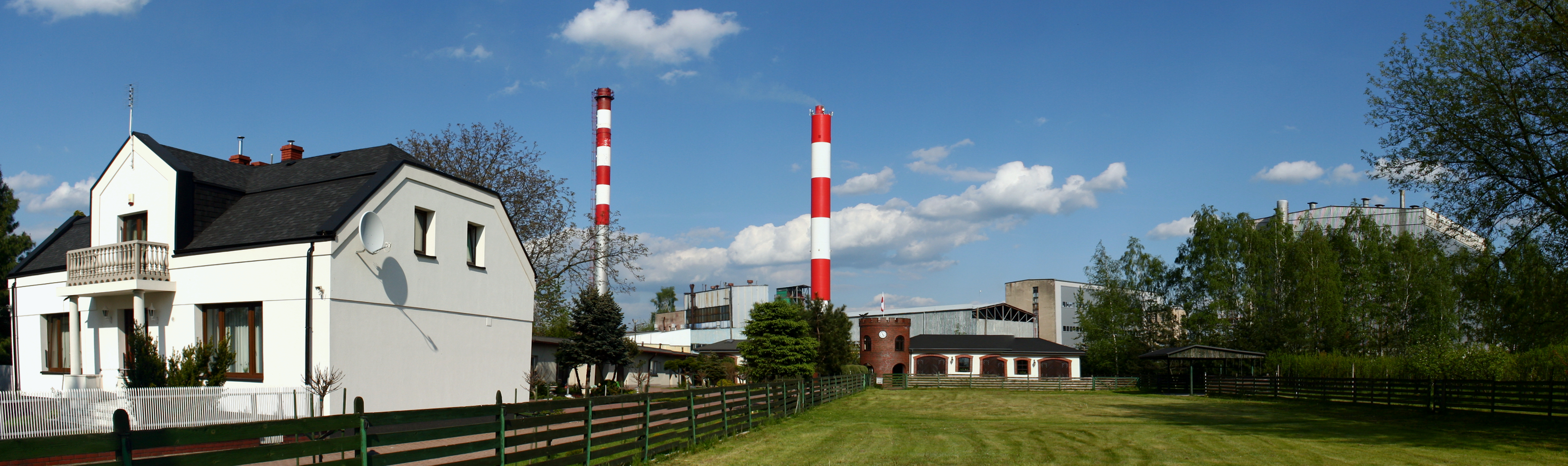

- Location within Poland
- Coordinates: 50°52′N 19°14′E
- Country: Poland
- Voivodeship: Silesian
- County: Częstochowa
- Gmina: Rędziny
- Population: 1,658

Rudniki [rudˈniki] is a village in the administrative district of Gmina Rędziny, within Częstochowa County, Silesian Voivodeship, in southern Poland.
