= Wanaty, Silesian Voivodeship =

Wanaty
- Village
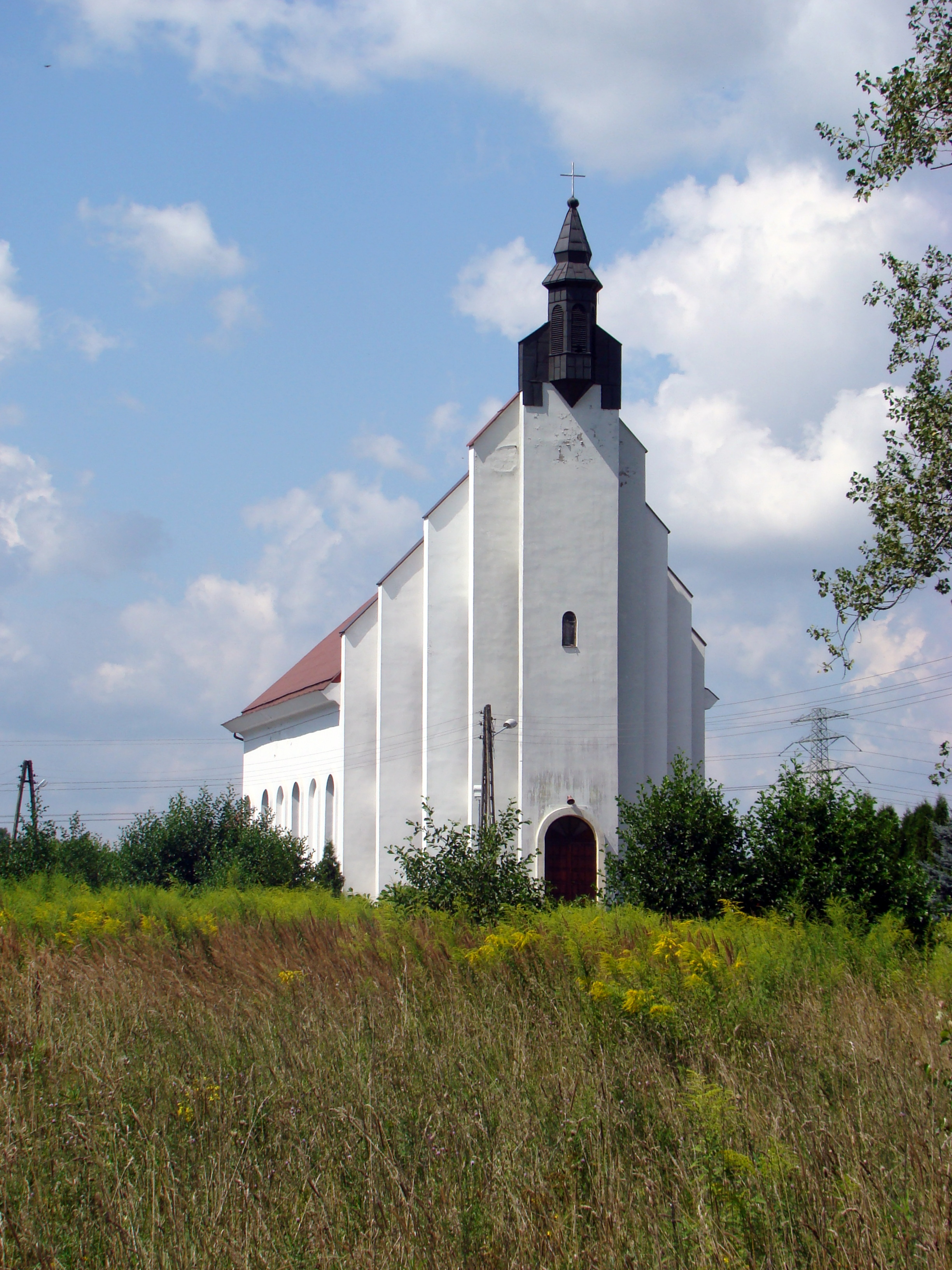
- Bl. Karolina Kózka Church in Wanaty

- Location within Poland
- Coordinates: 50°41′N 19°8′E
- Country: Poland
- Voivodeship: Silesian
- County: Częstochowa
- Gmina: Kamienica Polska
- Population: 667

Wanaty [vaˈnatɨ] is a village in the administrative district of Gmina Kamienica Polska, within Częstochowa County, Silesian Voivodeship, in southern Poland.
