= Podlesie, Gmina Kamienica Polska =

Podlesie
- Settlement
- Location within Poland
- Coordinates: 50°40′16″N 19°08′10″E
- Country: Poland
- Voivodeship: Silesian
- County: Częstochowa
- Gmina: Kamienica Polska
- Population: 19

Podlesie [pɔdˈlɛɕɛ] is a settlement in the administrative district of Gmina Kamienica Polska, within Częstochowa County, Silesian Voivodeship, in southern Poland.
