= Topolów =

- Settlement
- Location within Poland
- Coordinates: 50°54′21″N 19°9′40″E
- Country: Poland
- Voivodeship: Silesian
- County: Częstochowa
- Gmina: Mykanów
- Population: 41

Topolów [tɔˈpɔluf] is a settlement in the administrative district of Gmina Mykanów, within Częstochowa County, Silesian Voivodeship, in southern Poland.
