= Rusinów =

Rusinów or Rusinow may refer to:

- Rusinów, Lubusz Voivodeship (west Poland)
- Rusinów, Gmina Rusinów in Masovian Voivodeship (east-central Poland)
- Gmina Rusinów, Masovian Voivodeship
- Rusinów, Silesian Voivodeship (south Poland)
- Rusinow leads, in the game of contract bridge
