= Rybna =

Rybna may refer to the following places:

- Rybna, Lesser Poland Voivodeship (south Poland)
- Rybna, Opole Voivodeship (south-west Poland)
- Rybna, Silesian Voivodeship (south Poland)
