= Łochynia =

Village in Częstochowa County, Poland

- Village
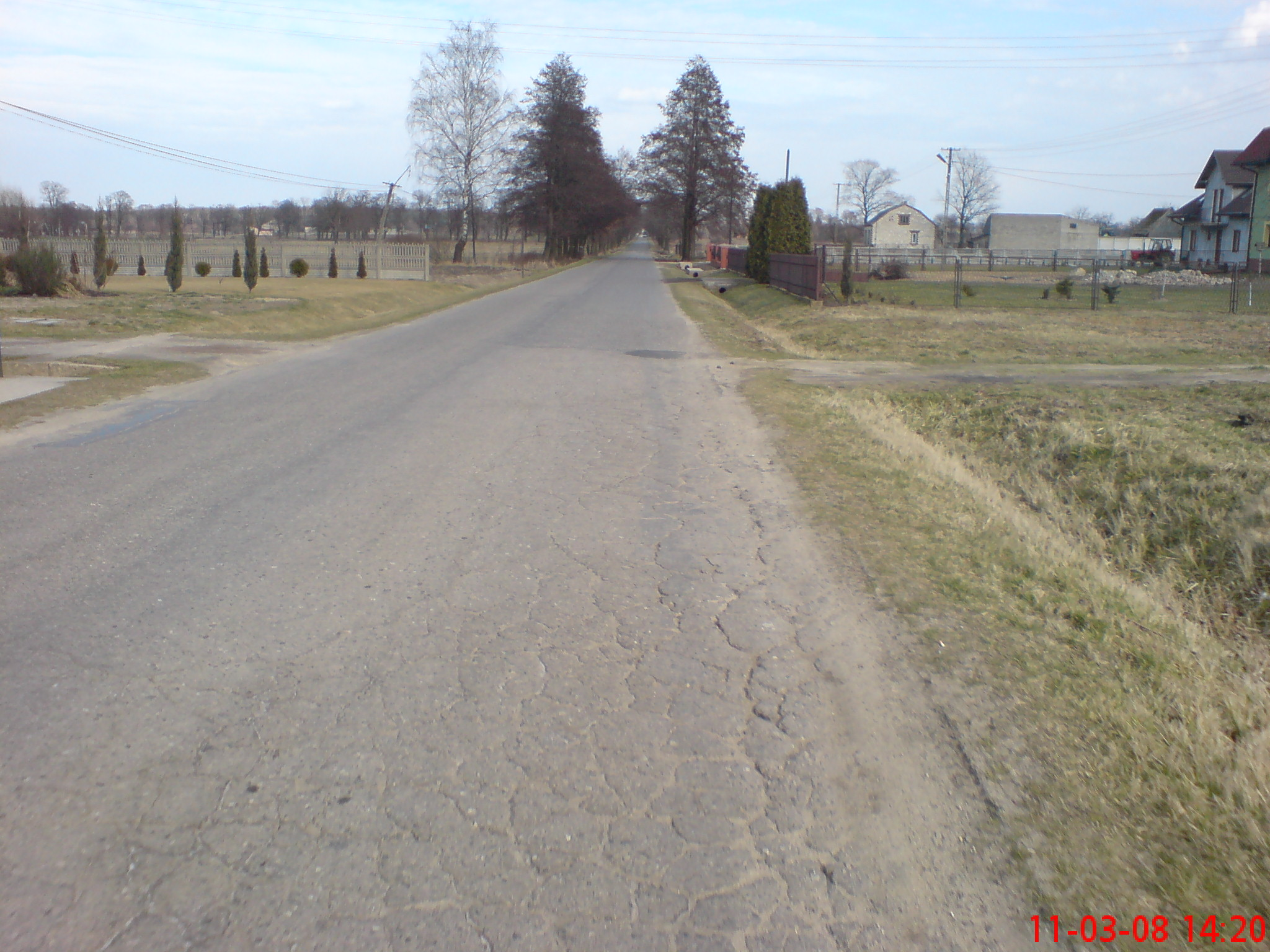

- Location within Poland
- Coordinates: 50°55′N 19°14′E
- Country: Poland
- Voivodeship: Silesian
- County: Częstochowa
- Gmina: Mykanów
- Elevation: 240 m (790 ft)
- Population: 227

Łochynia [wɔˈxɨɲa] is a village in the administrative district of Gmina Mykanów, within Częstochowa County, Silesian Voivodeship, in southern Poland.
