= Madalin, Silesian Voivodeship =

Madalin
- Village
- Location within Poland
- Coordinates: 50°54′50″N 19°13′16″E
- Country: Poland
- Voivodeship: Silesian
- County: Częstochowa
- Gmina: Rędziny

Madalin [maˈdalin] is a village in the administrative district of Gmina Rędziny, within Częstochowa County, Silesian Voivodeship, in southern Poland.
