= Stary Broniszew =

- Village
- Location within Poland
- Coordinates: 50°59′N 19°9′E
- Country: Poland
- Voivodeship: Silesian
- County: Częstochowa
- Gmina: Mykanów
- Population: 717

Stary Broniszew [ˈstarɨ brɔˈniʂɛf] is a village in the administrative district of Gmina Mykanów, within Częstochowa County, Silesian Voivodeship, in southern Poland.

== Notable people ==
- Krzysztof Smela, Polish politician
