= Radostków-Kolonia =

- Settlement
- Location within Poland
- Coordinates: 50°54′N 19°10′E
- Country: Poland
- Voivodeship: Silesian
- County: Częstochowa
- Gmina: Mykanów
- Population: 423

Radostków-Kolonia [raˈdɔstkuf kɔˈlɔɲa] is a settlement in the administrative district of Gmina Mykanów, within Częstochowa County, Silesian Voivodeship, in southern Poland.
