= Rudnik Mały, Silesian Voivodeship =

Rudnik Mały
- Village
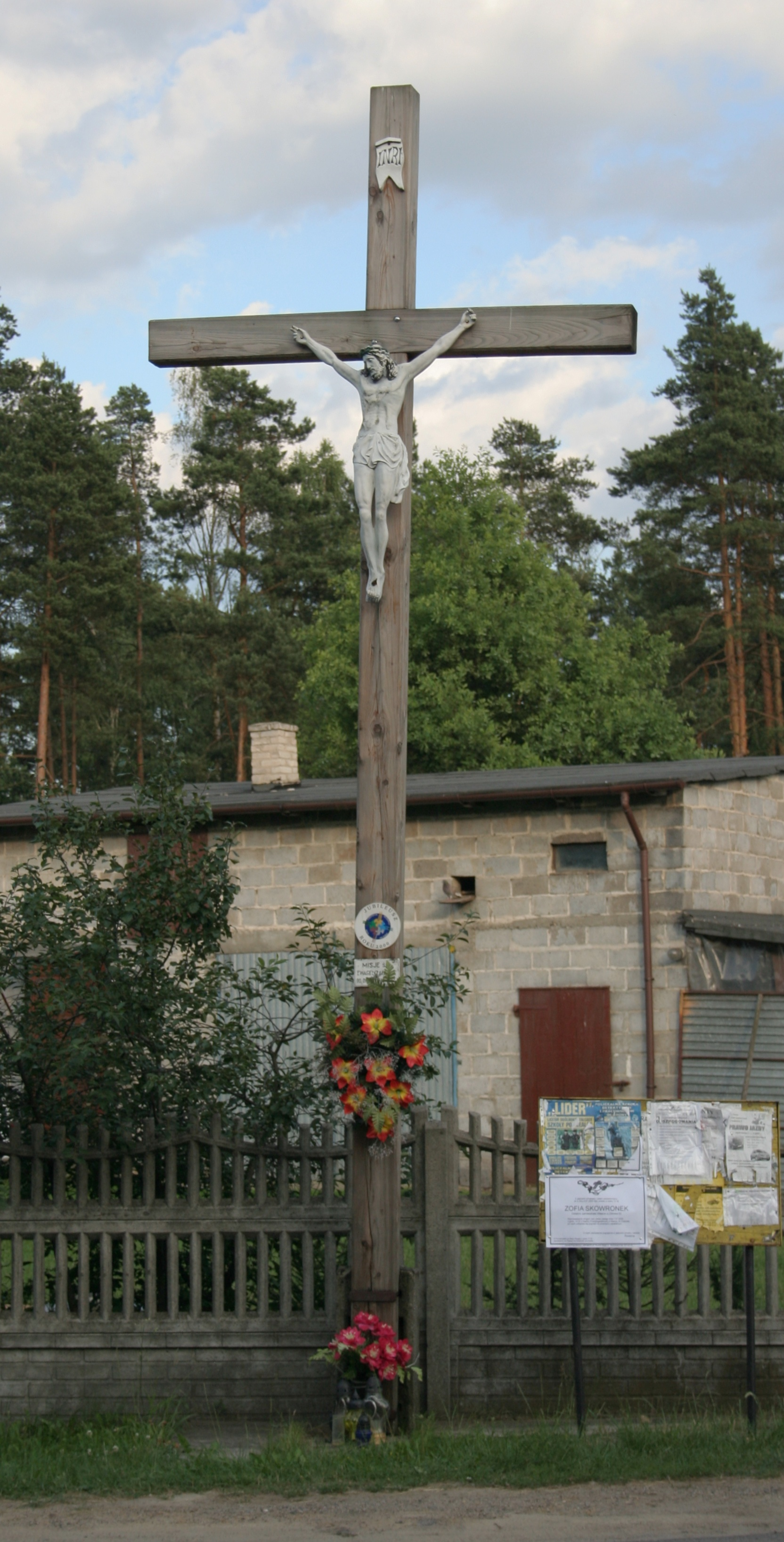
- Roadside cross

- Location within Poland
- Coordinates: 50°38′N 19°3′E
- Country: Poland
- Voivodeship: Silesian
- County: Częstochowa
- Gmina: Starcza
- Population: 505

Rudnik Mały (Polish pronunciation: [ˈrudɲik ˈmawɨ]) is a village in the administrative district of Gmina Starcza, within Częstochowa County, Silesian Voivodeship, in southern Poland.
