= Konin, Silesian Voivodeship =

Konin
- Village
- Location within Poland
- Coordinates: 50°52′N 19°16′E
- Country: Poland
- Voivodeship: Silesian
- County: Częstochowa
- Gmina: Rędziny
- Population: 851

Konin [ˈkɔnin] is a village in the administrative district of Gmina Rędziny, within Częstochowa County, Silesian Voivodeship, in southern Poland.
