= Antoniów, Silesian Voivodeship =

Antoniów
- Village
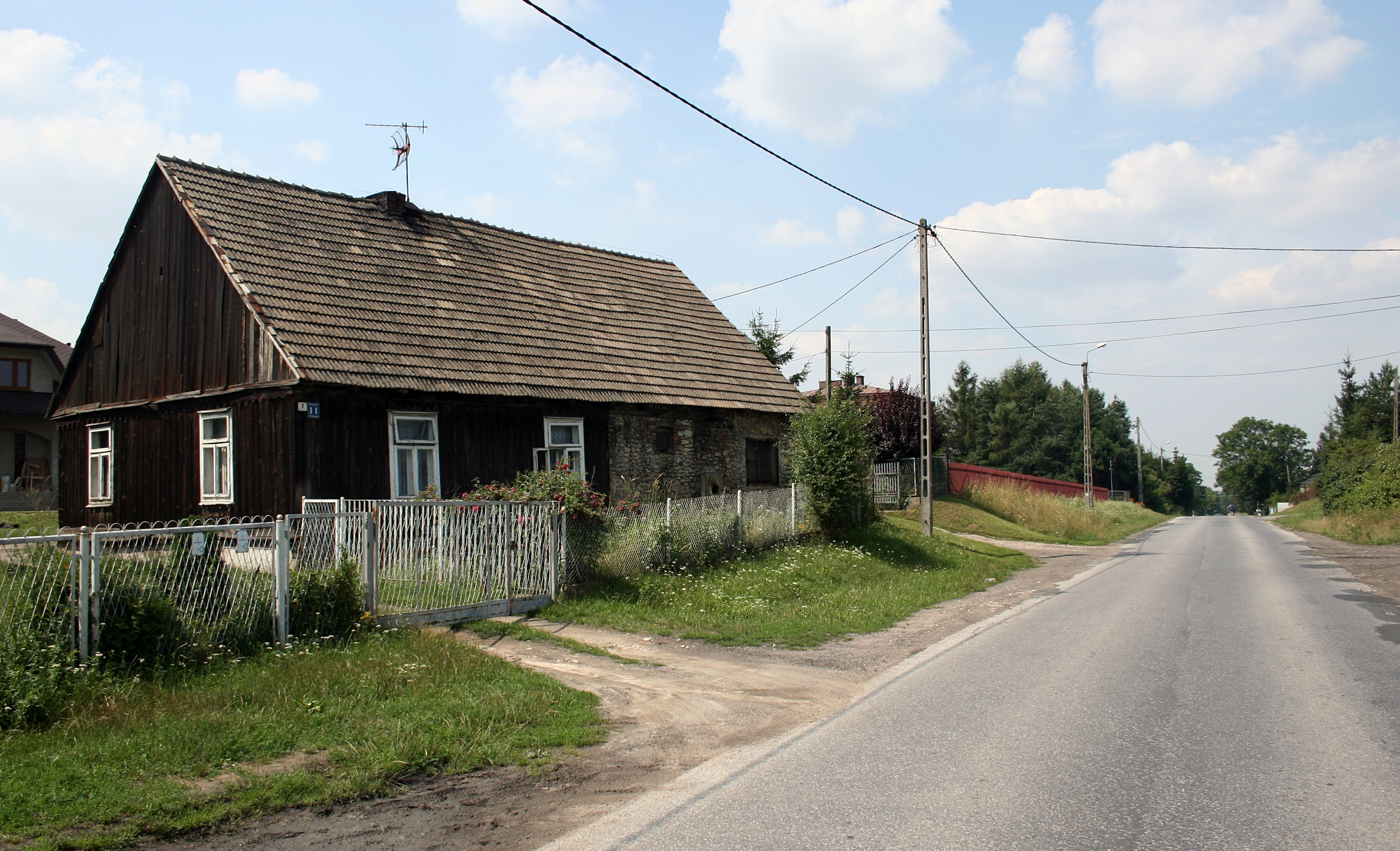

- Location within Poland
- Coordinates: 50°51′55″N 19°5′58″E
- Country: Poland
- Voivodeship: Silesian
- County: Częstochowa
- Gmina: Mykanów
- Population: 122

Antoniów [anˈtɔɲuf] is a village in the administrative district of Gmina Mykanów, within Częstochowa County, Silesian Voivodeship, in southern Poland.
