= Grabowa, Częstochowa County =

Grabowa
- Village
- Location within Poland
- Coordinates: 50°56′N 19°13′E
- Country: Poland
- Voivodeship: Silesian
- County: Częstochowa
- Gmina: Mykanów
- Population: 277

Grabowa [ɡraˈbɔva] is a village in the administrative district of Gmina Mykanów, within Częstochowa County, Silesian Voivodeship, in southern Poland.
