= Wierzchowisko, Silesian Voivodeship =

Wierzchowisko
- Village
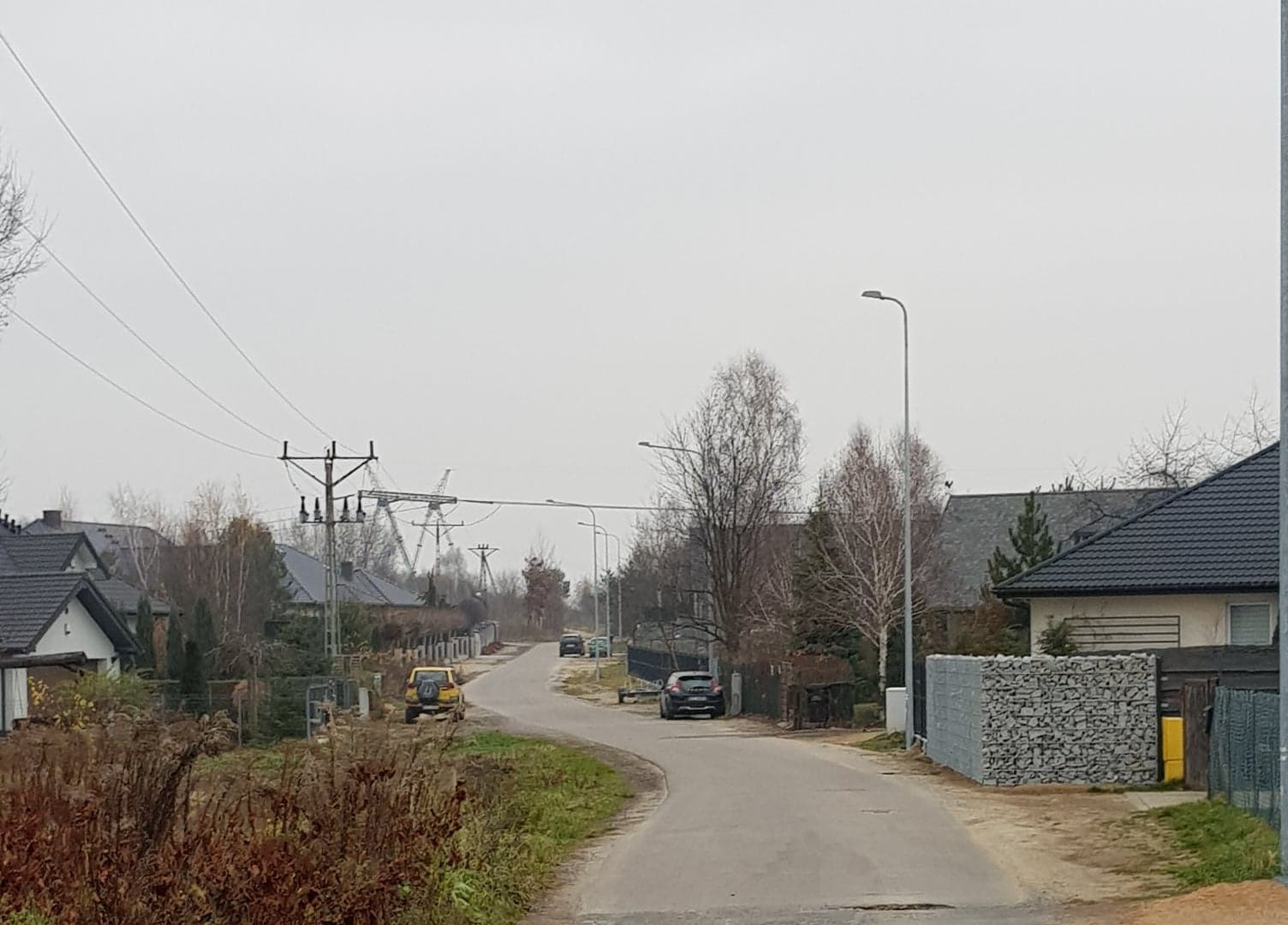

- Location within Poland
- Coordinates: 50°52′N 19°7′E
- Country: Poland
- Voivodeship: Silesian
- County: Częstochowa
- Gmina: Mykanów
- Population: 1,363

Wierzchowisko [vjɛʂxɔˈviskɔ] is a village in the administrative district of Gmina Mykanów, within Częstochowa County, Silesian Voivodeship, in southern Poland. It borders Częstochowa to the south and lies approximately 69 km (43 mi) north of the regional capital Katowice.
