= Zawada, Gmina Kamienica Polska =

Zawada
- Village
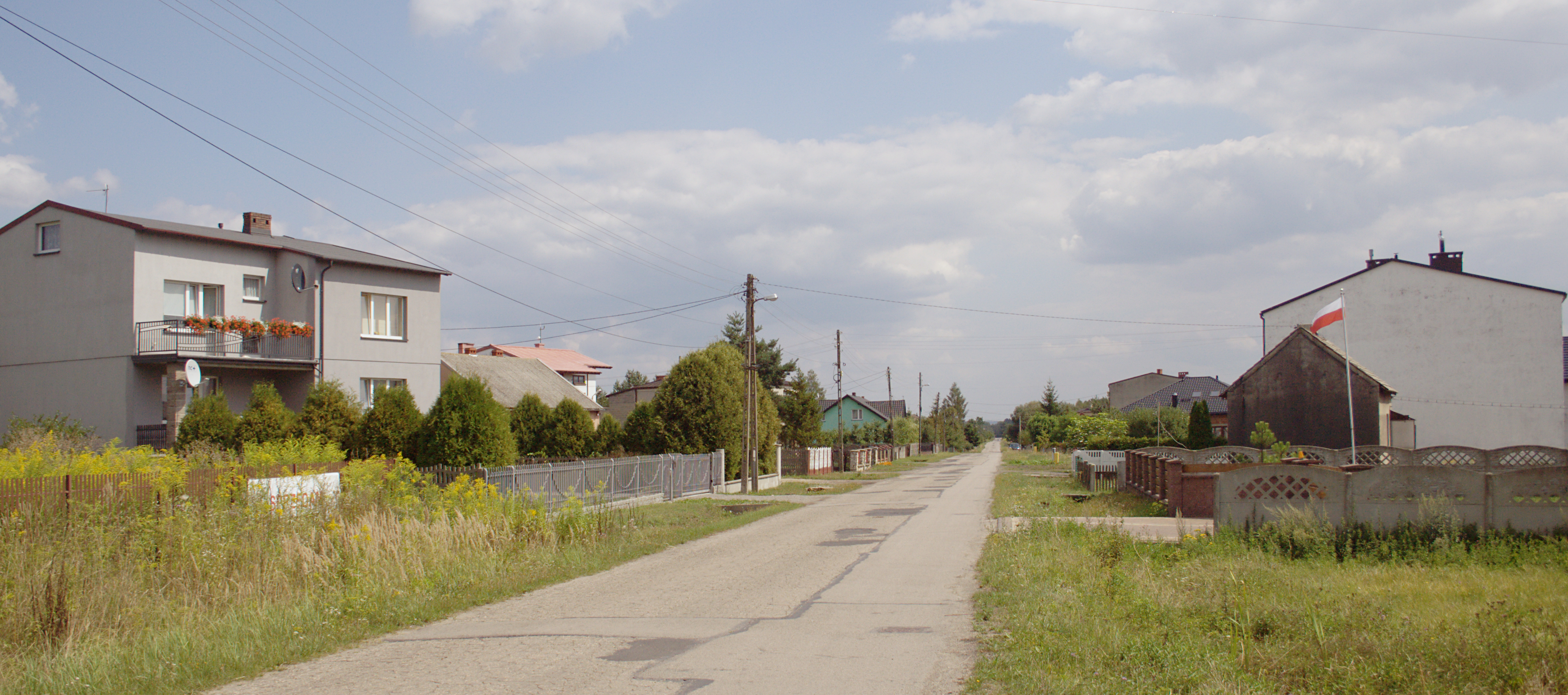

- Location within Poland
- Coordinates: 50°40′45″N 19°7′38″E
- Country: Poland
- Voivodeship: Silesian
- County: Częstochowa
- Gmina: Kamienica Polska
- Population: 649

Zawada [zaˈvada] is a village in the administrative district of Gmina Kamienica Polska, within Częstochowa County, Silesian Voivodeship, in southern Poland.
