= Romanów, Silesian Voivodeship =

Romanów
- Unincorporated Village
- Location within Poland
- Coordinates: 50°40′7″N 19°7′37″E
- Country: Poland
- Voivodeship: Silesian
- County: Częstochowa
- Gmina: Kamienica Polska
- Population: 308

Romanów [rɔˈmanuf] is an unincorporated village in the administrative district of Gmina Kamienica Polska, within Częstochowa County, Silesian Voivodeship, in southern Poland.
