= Klepaczka, Częstochowa County =

Klepaczka
- Village
- Location within Poland
- Coordinates: 50°40′N 19°3′E
- Country: Poland
- Voivodeship: Silesian
- County: Częstochowa
- Gmina: Starcza
- Population: 161

Klepaczka [klɛˈpat͡ʂka] is a village in the administrative district of Gmina Starcza, within Częstochowa County, Silesian Voivodeship, in southern Poland.
