= Przedkocin =

- Settlement
- Location within Poland
- Coordinates: 50°56′52″N 19°7′28″E
- Country: Poland
- Voivodeship: Silesian
- County: Częstochowa
- Gmina: Mykanów
- Population: 76

Przedkocin [pʂɛtˈkɔt͡ɕin] is a settlement in the administrative district of Gmina Mykanów, within Częstochowa County, Silesian Voivodeship, in southern Poland.
