= Smela (surname) =

Smela is a surname. Notable people with the surname include:

- Bolesław Smela (1919–1987), Polish actor
- Elisabeth Smela, American mechanical engineer
- Jan Smela (1910–1986), Polish Army officer
- Krzysztof Smela (born 1959), Polish politician
