= Osiny, Gmina Mykanów =

Osiny
- Village
- Location within Poland
- Coordinates: 50°57′52″N 19°13′13″E
- Country: Poland
- Voivodeship: Silesian
- County: Częstochowa
- Gmina: Mykanów
- Population: 6

Osiny [ɔˈɕinɨ] is a village in the administrative district of Gmina Mykanów, within Częstochowa County, Silesian Voivodeship, in southern Poland.
