= Gmina Rędziny =

Gmina Rędziny Rędziny Commune
- Gmina
- Flag Coat of arms
- Interactive map of Gmina Rędziny
- Coordinates (Rędziny): 50°51′29″N 19°12′51″E
- Country: Poland
- Voivodeship: Silesian
- County: Częstochowa
- Seat: Rędziny

Area
  - Total: 41.36 km^{2} (15.97 sq mi)

Population (2019-06-30)
  - Total: 9,990
  - Density: 242/km^{2} (626/sq mi)
- Website: http://www.redziny.pl

Gmina Rędziny is a rural gmina (administrative district) in Częstochowa County, Silesian Voivodeship, in southern Poland. Its seat is the village of Rędziny, which lies approximately 10 kilometres (6 mi) north-east of Częstochowa and 70 km (43 mi) north of the regional capital Katowice.

The gmina covers an area of 41.36 square kilometres (16.0 sq mi), and as of 2019 its total population is 9,990.

== Villages ==
Gmina Rędziny contains the villages and settlements of Konin, Kościelec, Madalin, Marianka Rędzińska, Rędziny and Rudniki.

== Neighbouring gminas ==
Gmina Rędziny is bordered by the city of Częstochowa and by the gminas of Kłomnice, Mstów and Mykanów.
