= Rusinów, Silesian Voivodeship =

Rusinów
- Village
- Location within Poland
- Coordinates: 50°58′N 19°11′E
- Country: Poland
- Voivodeship: Silesian
- County: Częstochowa
- Gmina: Mykanów
- Population: 81

Rusinów [ruˈɕinuf] is a village in the administrative district of Gmina Mykanów, within Częstochowa County, Silesian Voivodeship, in southern Poland.
