= Starcza =

- Village
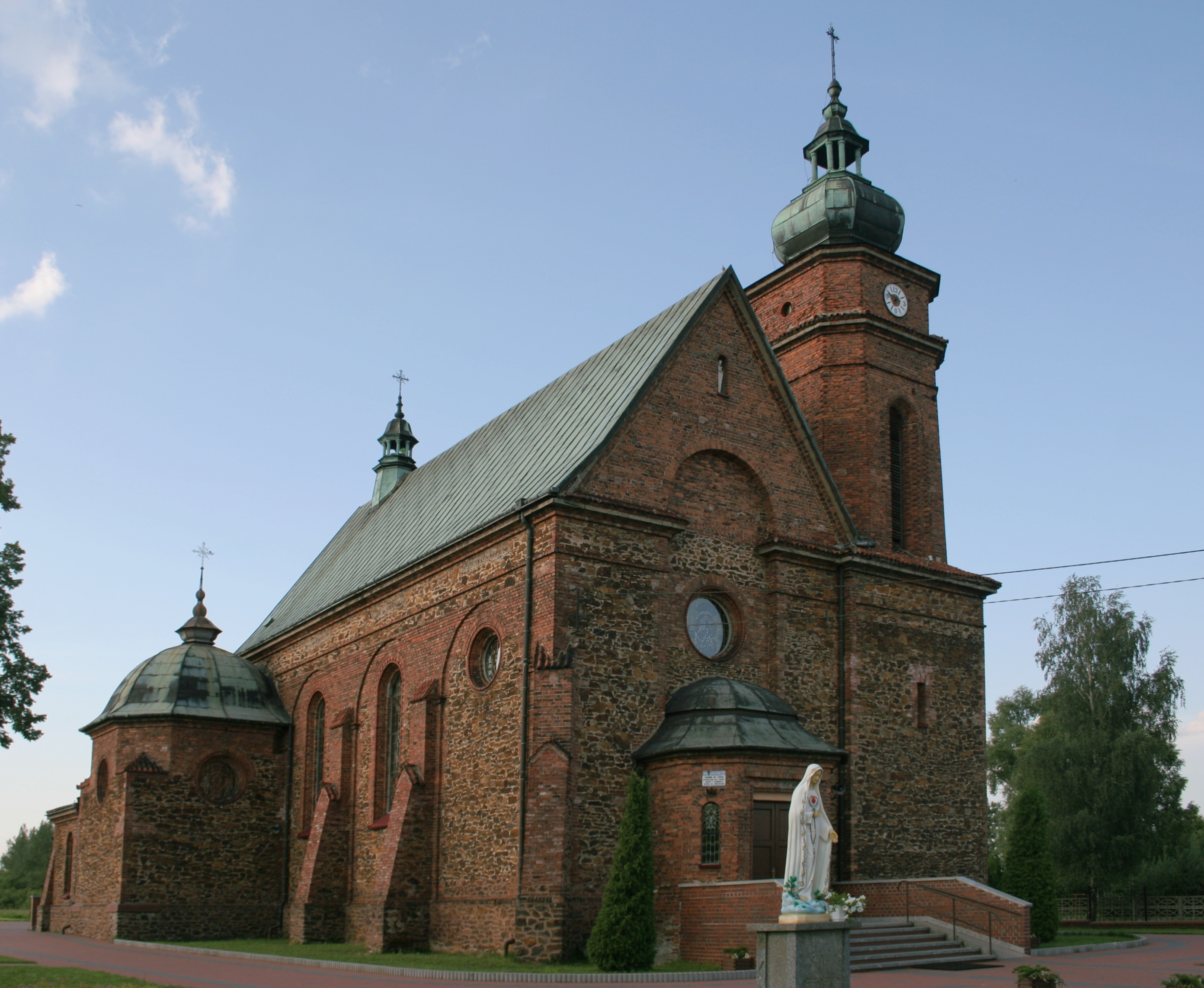
- Church of Our Lady of Częstochowa

- Location within Poland
- Coordinates: 50°39′N 19°2′E
- Country: Poland
- Voivodeship: Silesian
- County: Częstochowa
- Gmina: Starcza

Population
  - Total: 1,232

Starcza [ˈstart͡ʂa] is a village in Częstochowa County, Silesian Voivodeship, in southern Poland. It is the seat of the gmina (administrative district) called Gmina Starcza.
