= Kamienica Polska =

- Village
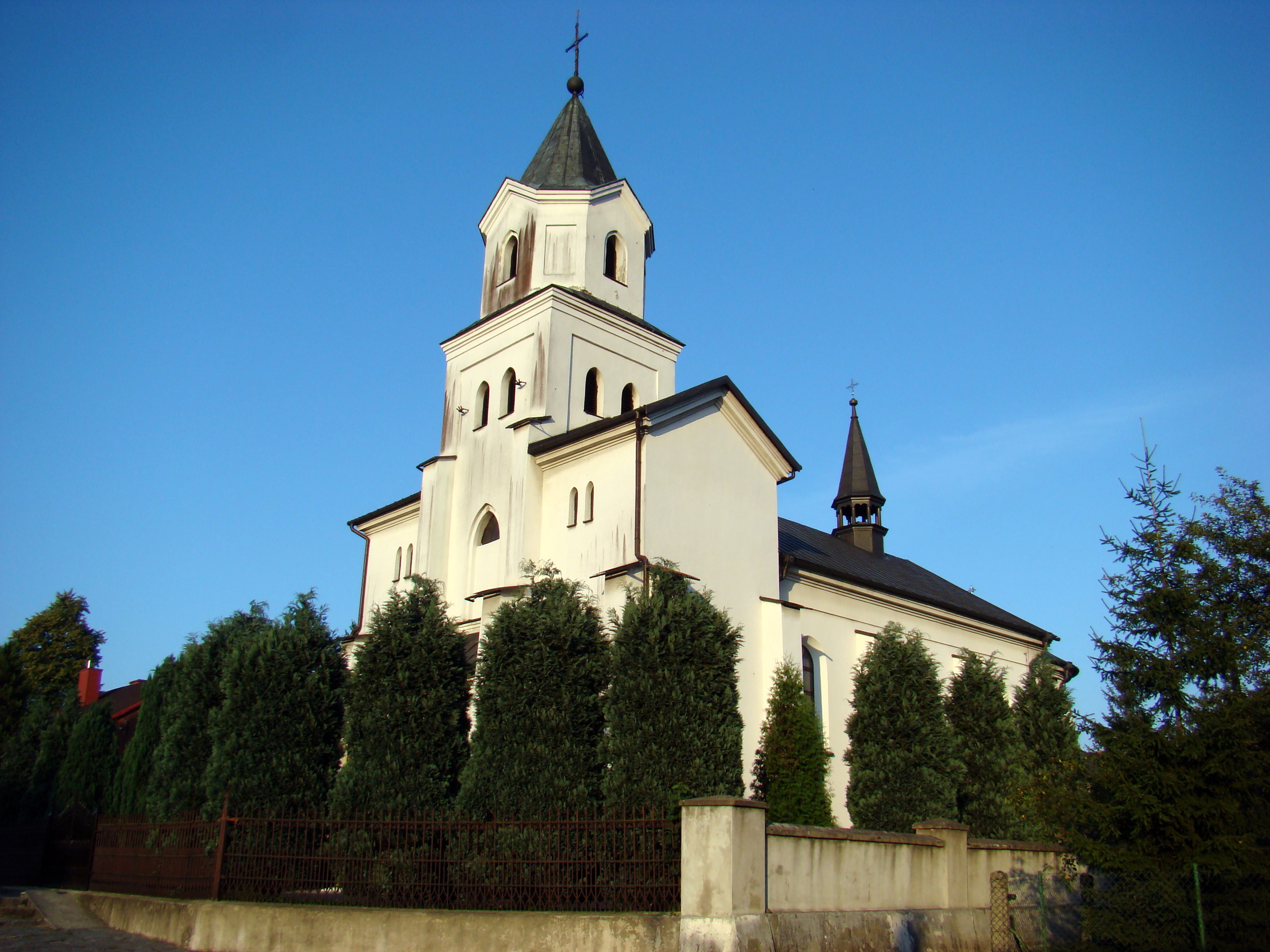
- Archangel Michael Church in Kamienica Polska

- Location within Poland
- Coordinates: 50°41′N 19°9′E
- Country: Poland
- Voivodeship: Silesian
- County: Częstochowa
- Gmina: Kamienica Polska

Population
  - Total: 1,456
- Time zone: UTC+1 (CET)
  - Summer (DST): UTC+2 (CEST)
- Vehicle registration: SCZ

Kamienica Polska [kamjɛˈnit͡sa ˈpɔlska] is a village in Częstochowa County, Silesian Voivodeship, in southern Poland. It is the seat of the gmina (administrative district) called Gmina Kamienica Polska. It is situated on the Kamieniczka River, a tributary of the Warta River.

== History ==
The village formed part of the Catholic parish of Poczesna until 1867, when a local parish was established. In 1873, the Walentynów mine was opened.

Following the German-Soviet invasion of Poland, which started World War II in September 1939, the village was occupied by Germany until 1945. Several Poles, who were either born or lived and worked in the village, including the local police chief, were murdered by the Russians in the Katyn massacre in 1940.
