= Rędziny, Częstochowa County =

Rędziny
- Village
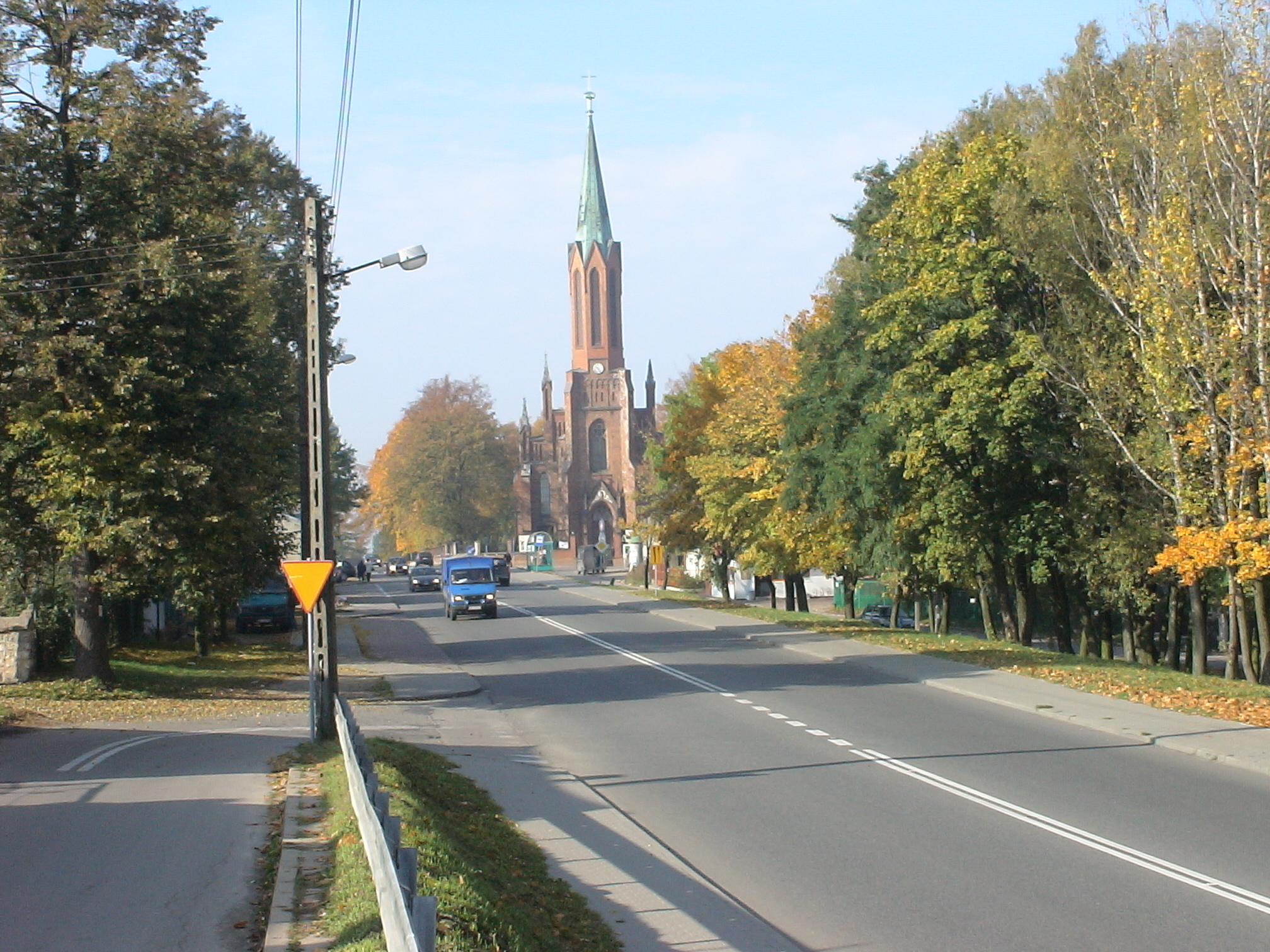

- Location within Poland
- Coordinates: 50°51′29″N 19°12′51″E
- Country: Poland
- Voivodeship: Silesian
- County: Częstochowa
- Gmina: Rędziny
- Population: 4,753
- Postal code: 42-242
- Website: http://www.redziny.pl

Rędziny [rɛnˈd͡ʑinɨ] is a village in Częstochowa County, Silesian Voivodeship, in southern Poland. It is the seat of the gmina (administrative district) called Gmina Rędziny.
