= Mykanów =

- Village
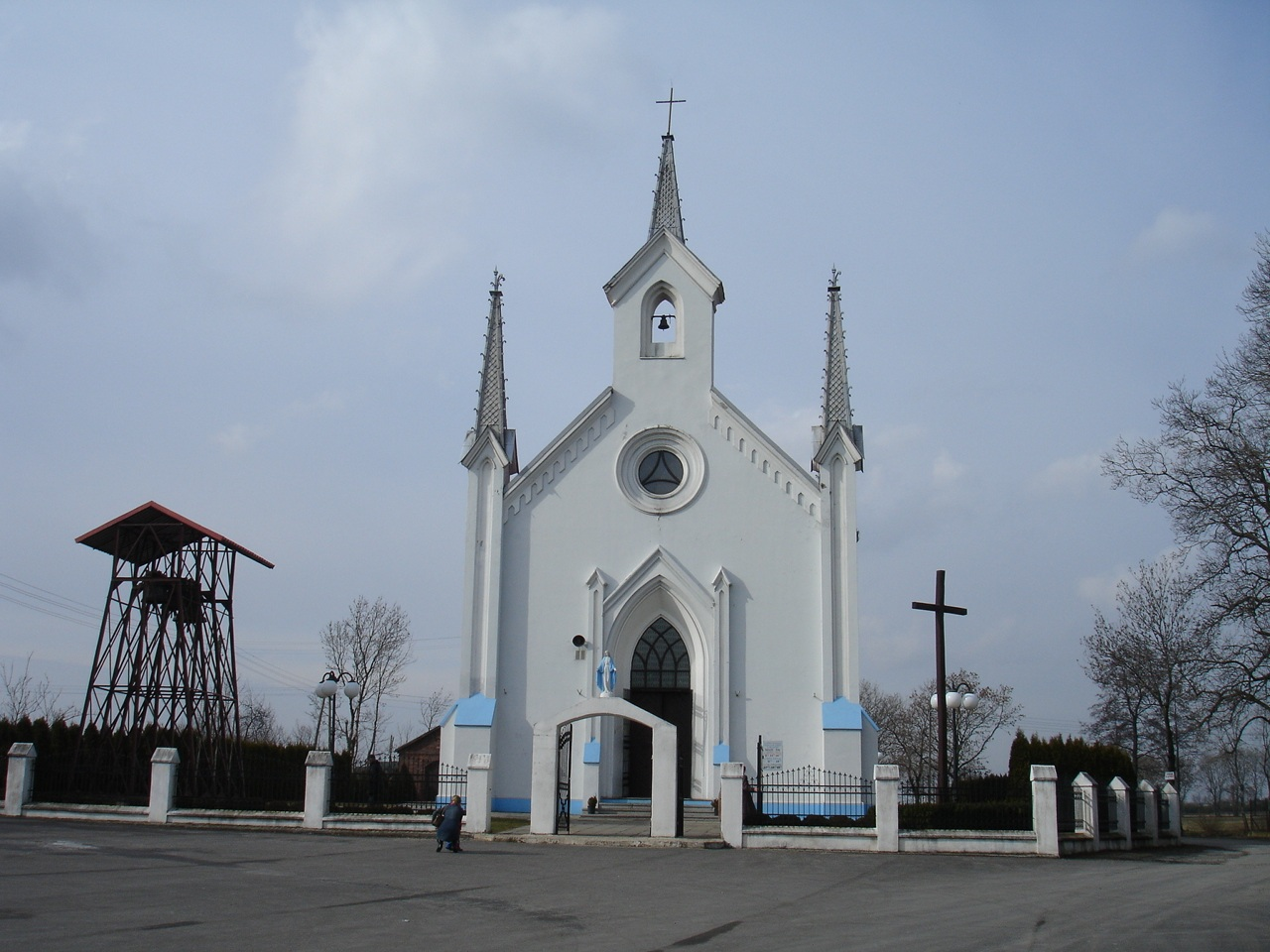
- Saint Leonard church in Mykanów

- Location within Poland
- Coordinates: 50°55′N 19°11′E
- Country: Poland
- Voivodeship: Silesian
- County: Częstochowa
- Gmina: Mykanów

Population
  - Total: 1,002
- Time zone: UTC+1 (CET)
  - Summer (DST): UTC+2 (CEST)
- Vehicle registration: SCZ

Mykanów [mɨˈkanuf] is a village in Częstochowa County, Silesian Voivodeship, in southern Poland. It is the seat of the gmina (administrative district) called Gmina Mykanów.

== History ==
Following the German-Soviet invasion of Poland, which started World War II in September 1939, it was occupied by Germany until 1945. A local Polish policeman was murdered by the Russians in the Katyn massacre in 1940.
