= Gmina Kamienica Polska =

Gmina Kamienica Polska Kamienica Polska Commune
- Gmina
- Interactive map of Gmina Kamienica Polska
- Coordinates (Kamienica Polska): 50°41′N 19°9′E
- Country: Poland
- Voivodeship: Silesian
- County: Częstochowa
- Seat: Kamienica Polska

Area
  - Total: 46.72 km^{2} (18.04 sq mi)

Population (2019-06-30)
  - Total: 5,573
  - Density: 119.3/km^{2} (308.9/sq mi)
- Website: https://kamienicapolska.pl/

Gmina Kamienica Polska is a rural gmina (administrative district) in Częstochowa County, Silesian Voivodeship, in southern Poland. Its seat is the village of Kamienica Polska, which lies approximately 14 kilometres (9 mi) south of Częstochowa and 50 km (31 mi) north of the regional capital Katowice.

The gmina covers an area of 46.72 square kilometres (18.0 sq mi), and as of 2019 its total population is 5,573.

== Villages ==
The Gmina is made up of 9 villages which 6 are incorporated and 3 are unincorporated. Gmina Kamienica Polska contains the villages and settlements of Kamienica Polska, Osiny, Podlesie, Romanów, Rudnik Wielki, Wanaty, Zawada and Zawisna.

== Neighbouring gminas ==
Gmina Kamienica Polska is bordered by the gminas of Koziegłowy, Olsztyn, Poczesna, Poraj, Starcza and Woźniki.
