= Osiny, Częstochowa County =

Osiny
- Village
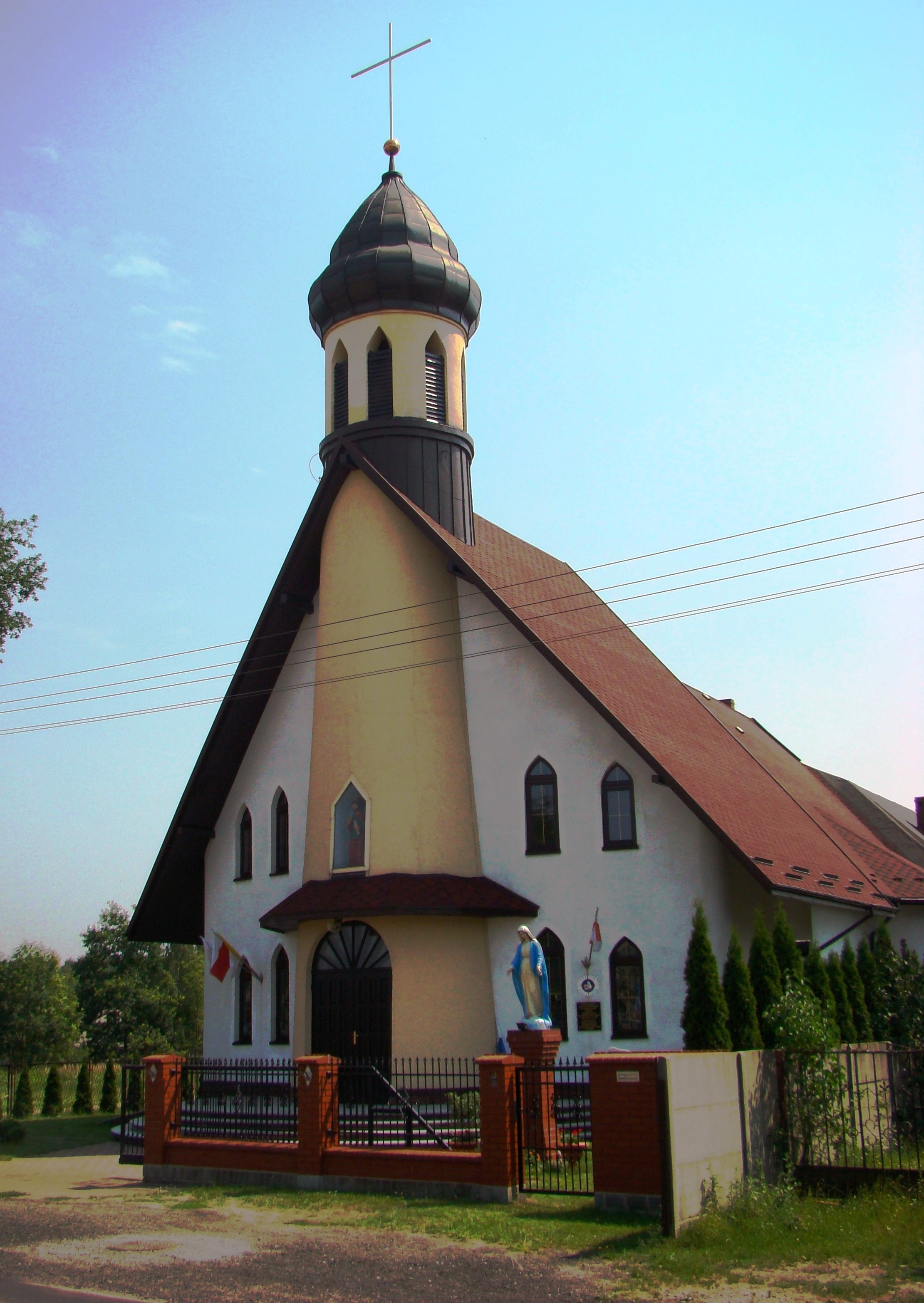
- Catholic church

- Location within Poland
- Coordinates: 50°41′N 19°11′E
- Country: Poland
- Voivodeship: Silesian
- County: Częstochowa
- Gmina: Kamienica Polska
- Population: 799

Osiny [ɔˈɕinɨ] is a village in the administrative district of Gmina Kamienica Polska, within Częstochowa County, Silesian Voivodeship, in southern Poland.
