= Krzysztof Smela =

Polish politician

Częstochowa County Starost
- Incumbent
- Assumed office 9 February 2017
- Preceded by: Andrzej Kwapisz

Personal details
- Born: 23 July 1959 (age 66) Stary Broniszew
- Party: Polish People's Party (PSL)

Krzysztof Smela (born 23 July 1959, in Stary Broniszew) is a Polish politician and local official.

He is a member of the General Council of the PSL and the leader of the county PSL structures. From 1994 to 1998 he was a councilor of the Silesian Regional Assembly. From 1998 to 2002 Smela was a councilor of Częstochowa County. In 1995 he was elected a mayor by the council of the Gmina Mykanów. First direct elections in 2002 for the mayor of the Gmina Mykanów were won by Smela. He obtained a reelection in 2006 and 2010. In 2014 he was defeated by his opponent Dariusz Pomada. In 2014 he was also nominated to be a member of the executive board of the Częstochowa County. In 2017 he was chosen by Council of Częstochowa County a Starost (governor). In 2018 he took part in the local elections to the Częstochowa County Council from his party and was elected, winning the highest score among all candidates for councilors in the County. In the parliamentary elections in 2019 he unsuccessfully ran in elections to the Sejm as a PSL candidate, getting 3894 votes.

== See also ==
- Częstochowa County
