= Kokawa, Poland =

Kokawa
- Village
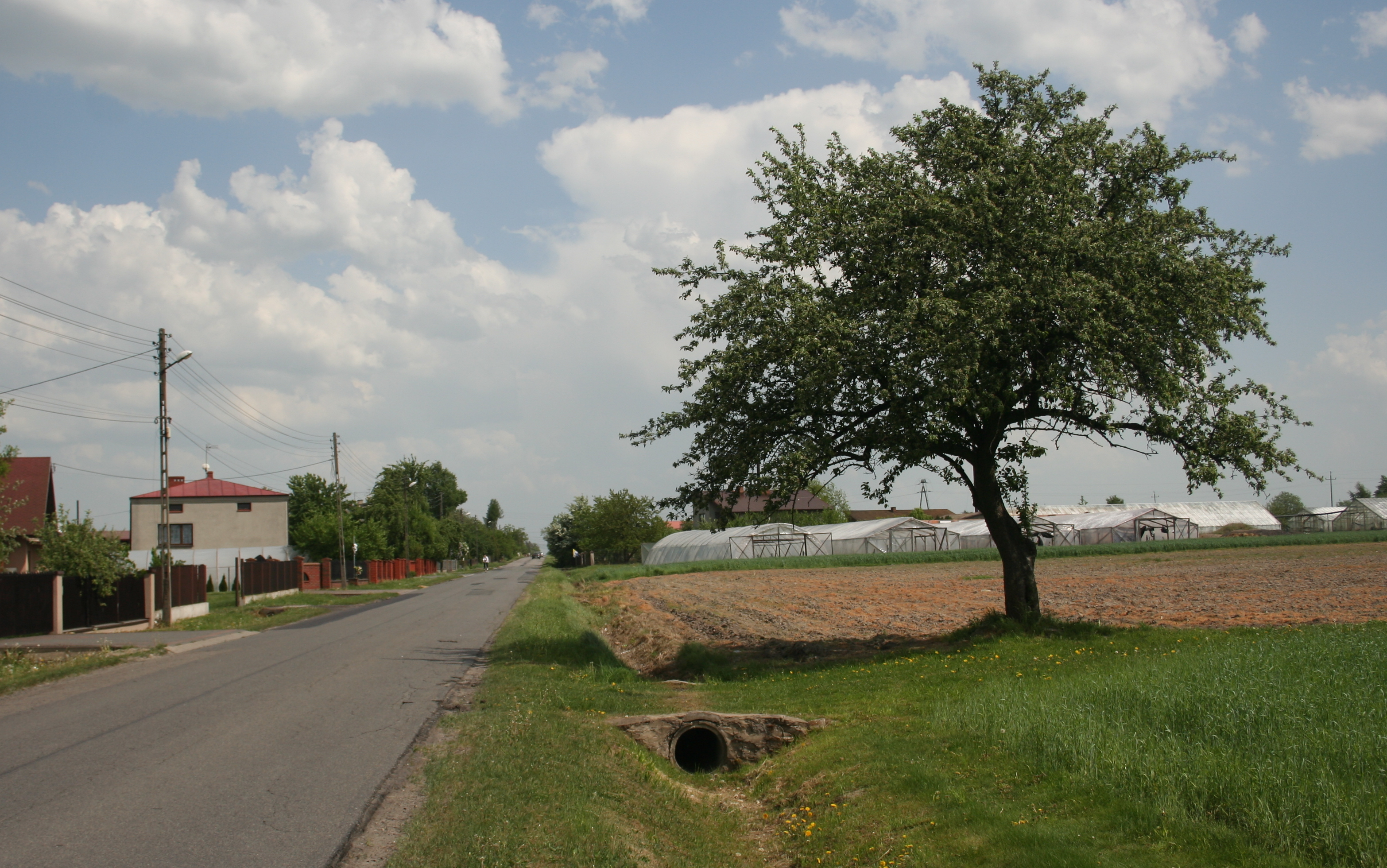

- Location within Poland
- Coordinates: 50°55′N 19°9′E
- Country: Poland
- Voivodeship: Silesian
- County: Częstochowa
- Gmina: Mykanów
- Population: 583
- Website: http://www.kokawa.pl/

Kokawa [kɔˈkava] is a village in the administrative district of Gmina Mykanów, within Częstochowa County, Silesian Voivodeship, in southern Poland.

== Notable people ==
- Artur Barciś, Polish actor
