= Rybna, Silesian Voivodeship =

Rybna
- Village
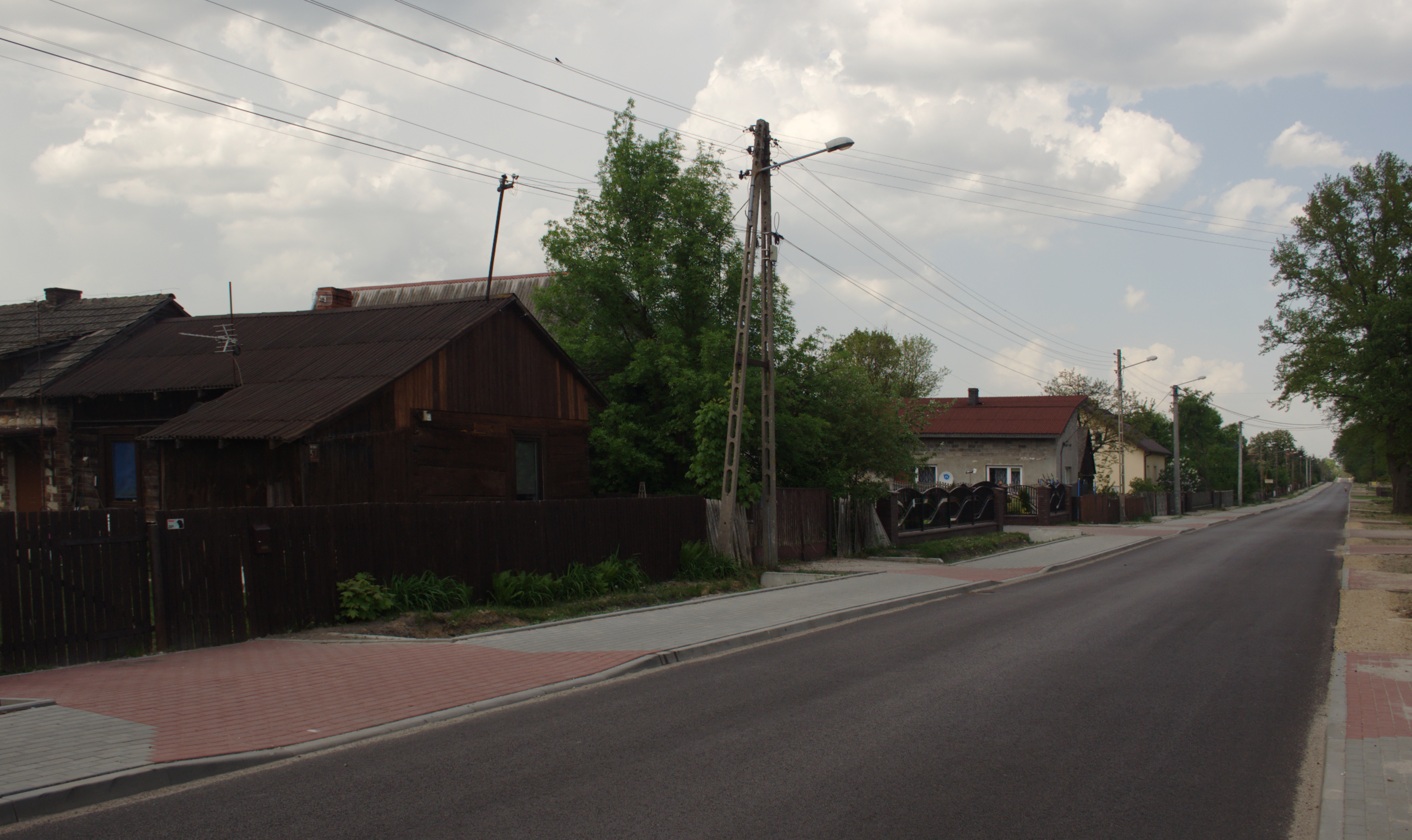

- Location within Poland
- Coordinates: 50°56′N 19°7′E
- Country: Poland
- Voivodeship: Silesian
- County: Częstochowa
- Gmina: Mykanów
- Population: 494

Rybna [ˈrɨbna] is a village in the administrative district of Gmina Mykanów, within Częstochowa County, Silesian Voivodeship, in southern Poland.
