= Gmina Starcza =

Gmina Starcza Starcza Commune
- Gmina
- Interactive map of Gmina Starcza
- Coordinates (Starcza): 50°40′N 19°3′E
- Country: Poland
- Voivodeship: Silesian
- County: Częstochowa
- Seat: Starcza

Area
  - Total: 20.1 km^{2} (7.8 sq mi)

Population (2019-06-30)
  - Total: 2,823
  - Density: 140/km^{2} (364/sq mi)
- Website: http://www.gmina-starcza.pl/

Gmina Starcza is a rural gmina (administrative district) in Częstochowa County, Silesian Voivodeship, in southern Poland. Its seat is the village of Starcza, which lies approximately 16 kilometres (10 mi) south of Częstochowa and 47 km (29 mi) north of the regional capital Katowice.

The gmina covers an area of 20.1 square kilometres (7.8 sq mi), and as of 2019 its total population is 2,823.

The gmina contains part of the protected area called Upper Liswarta Forests Landscape Park.

== Villages ==
Gmina Starcza contains the villages and settlements of Klepaczka, Łazy, Łysiec, Rudnik Mały, Starcza, Własna and Zielone Górki.

== Neighbouring gminas ==
Gmina Starcza is bordered by the gminas of Kamienica Polska, Konopiska, Poczesna and Woźniki.
