= Gmina Mykanów =

Gmina Mykanów Mykanów Commune
- Gmina
- Coat of arms
- Interactive map of Gmina Mykanów
- Coordinates (Mykanów): 50°55′N 19°11′E
- Country: Poland
- Voivodeship: Silesian
- County: Częstochowa
- Seat: Mykanów

Government
  - Wójt: Dariusz Pomada (Ind.)

Area
  - Total: 140.64 km^{2} (54.30 sq mi)

Population (2019-06-30)
  - Total: 15,056
  - Density: 107.05/km^{2} (277.27/sq mi)
- Website: http://www.mykanow.pl

Gmina Mykanów is a rural gmina (administrative district) in Częstochowa County, Silesian Voivodeship, in southern Poland. Its seat is the village of Mykanów, which lies approximately 14 kilometres (9 mi) north of Częstochowa and 76 km (47 mi) north of the regional capital Katowice.

The gmina covers an area of 140.64 square kilometres (54.3 sq mi), and as of 2019 its total population is 15,056.

== Villages ==
Gmina Mykanów contains the villages and settlements of Adamów, Antoniów, Borowno, Borowno-Kolonia, Cykarzew Północny, Cykarzew Północny-Stacja, Czarny Las, Dudki, Florków, Grabowa, Grabówka, Jamno, Kokawa, Kolonia Wierzchowisko, Kuźnica Kiedrzyńska, Kuźnica Lechowa, Lemańsk, Łochynia, Lubojenka, Lubojna, Mykanów, Nowa Rybna, Nowy Broniszew, Nowy Kocin, Osiny, Pasieka, Przedkocin, Radostków, Radostków-Kolonia, Rusinów, Rybna, Stary Broniszew, Stary Cykarzew, Stary Cykarzew POM, Stary Kocin, Topolów, Tylin, Wierzchowisko, Wola Hankowska and Wola Kiedrzyńska.

== Neighbouring gminas ==
Gmina Mykanów is bordered by the city of Częstochowa and by the gminas of Kłobuck, Kłomnice, Kruszyna, Miedźno, Nowa Brzeźnica and Rędziny.

== Administration ==
=== Mayor ===
- Dariusz Pomada (RiN) – since 2014

=== Mykanów Council ===

RiN - 4 seats, PSL - 3, PiS - 2, Other - 6
