= Osiny, Wodzisław County =

Osiny
- Village
- Coat of arms

- Location within Poland
- Coordinates: 49°58′24″N 18°22′59″E
- Country: Poland
- Voivodeship: Silesian
- County: Wodzisław
- Gmina: Gorzyce

Osiny [ɔˈɕinɨ] is a village in the administrative district of Gmina Gorzyce, within Wodzisław County, Silesian Voivodeship, in southern Poland, close to the Czech border.
