= Błeszno, Masovian Voivodeship =

Błeszno
- Village
- Location within Poland
- Coordinates: 51°35′N 20°51′E
- Country: Poland
- Voivodeship: Masovian
- County: Białobrzegi
- Gmina: Radzanów

Błeszno [ˈbwɛʂnɔ] is a village in the administrative district of Gmina Radzanów, within Białobrzegi County, Masovian Voivodeship, in east-central Poland.
