= Częstochowa County =

Częstochowa County Powiat częstochowski
- County
- Flag Coat of arms

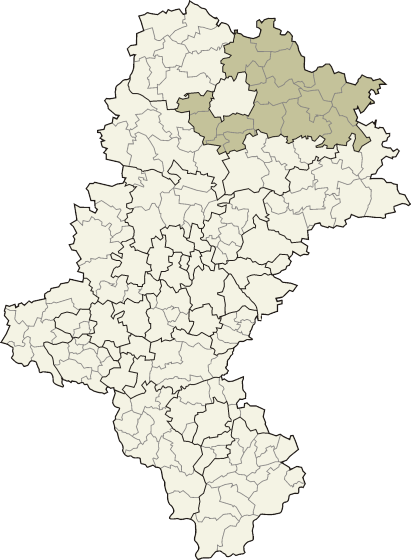
- Location within Silesian Voivodeship
- Coordinates (Częstochowa): 50°48′N 19°7′E
- Country: Poland
- Voivodeship: Silesian
- Seat: Częstochowa
- Gminas: Total 16: Gmina Blachownia; Gmina Dąbrowa Zielona; Gmina Janów; Gmina Kamienica Polska; Gmina Kłomnice; Gmina Koniecpol; Gmina Konopiska; Gmina Kruszyna; Gmina Lelów; Gmina Mstów; Gmina Mykanów; Gmina Olsztyn; Gmina Poczesna; Gmina Przyrów; Gmina Rędziny; Gmina Starcza

Government
  - Starosta: Krzysztof Smela (PSL)

Area
  - Total: 1,519.49 km^{2} (586.68 sq mi)

Population (2019-06-30)
  - Total: 134,637
  - Density: 88.6067/km^{2} (229.490/sq mi)
  - Urban: 15,455
  - Rural: 119,182
- Car plates: SCZ
- Website: www.czestochowa.powiat.pl

Częstochowa County (Polish: powiat częstochowski) is a unit of territorial administration and local government (powiat) in Silesian Voivodeship, southern Poland. It came into being on January 1, 1999, as a result of the Polish local government reforms passed in 1998. Its administrative seat is the city of Częstochowa, although the city is not part of the county (it constitutes a separate city county). The towns in Częstochowa County are Blachownia, Koniecpol, Przyrów and Olsztyn.

The county covers an area of 1,519.49 square kilometres (586.7 sq mi). As of 2019 its total population is 134,637, out of which the population of Blachownia is 9,545, that of Koniecpol is 5,910, and the rural population is 119,182.

== Neighbouring counties ==
Apart from the city of Częstochowa, Częstochowa County is also bordered by Pajęczno County to the north, Radomsko County to the north-east, Włoszczowa County to the east, Zawiercie County and Myszków County to the south, Lubliniec County to the west, and Kłobuck County to the north-west.

== Administrative divisions ==
The county is subdivided into 16 gminas (two urban-rural and 14 rural). These are listed in the following table, in descending order of population.

Gmina	Type	Area (km^{2})	Population (2019)	Seat
Gmina Mykanów	rural	140.6	15,056	Mykanów
Gmina Kłomnice	rural	147.9	13,484	Kłomnice
Gmina Blachownia	urban-rural	67.2	12,935	Blachownia
Gmina Poczesna	rural	60.1	12,684	Poczesna
Gmina Mstów	rural	119.8	10,833	Mstów
Gmina Konopiska	rural	78.1	10,715	Konopiska
Gmina Rędziny	rural	41.4	9,990	Rędziny
Gmina Koniecpol	urban-rural	146.8	9,441	Koniecpol
Gmina Olsztyn	urban-rural	108.8	7,833	Olsztyn
Gmina Janów	rural	147.0	5,959	Janów
Gmina Kamienica Polska	rural	46.7	5,573	Kamienica Polska
Gmina Lelów	rural	120.8	4,847	Lelów
Gmina Kruszyna	rural	93.4	4,840	Kruszyna
Gmina Dąbrowa Zielona	rural	100.3	3,867	Dąbrowa Zielona
Gmina Przyrów	urban-rural	80.4	3,757	Przyrów
Gmina Starcza	rural	20.1	2,823	Starcza

== Administration ==
=== Starost (Governor) ===
- Krzysztof Smela (PSL) - since 9 February 2017

=== Częstochowa County Council ===

Majority (coalition): PSL (green) - 9, KO (orange) - 1, local committees (black) - 7

Opposition: PiS (blue) - 8
