= Drochlin, Silesian Voivodeship =

Drochlin
- Village
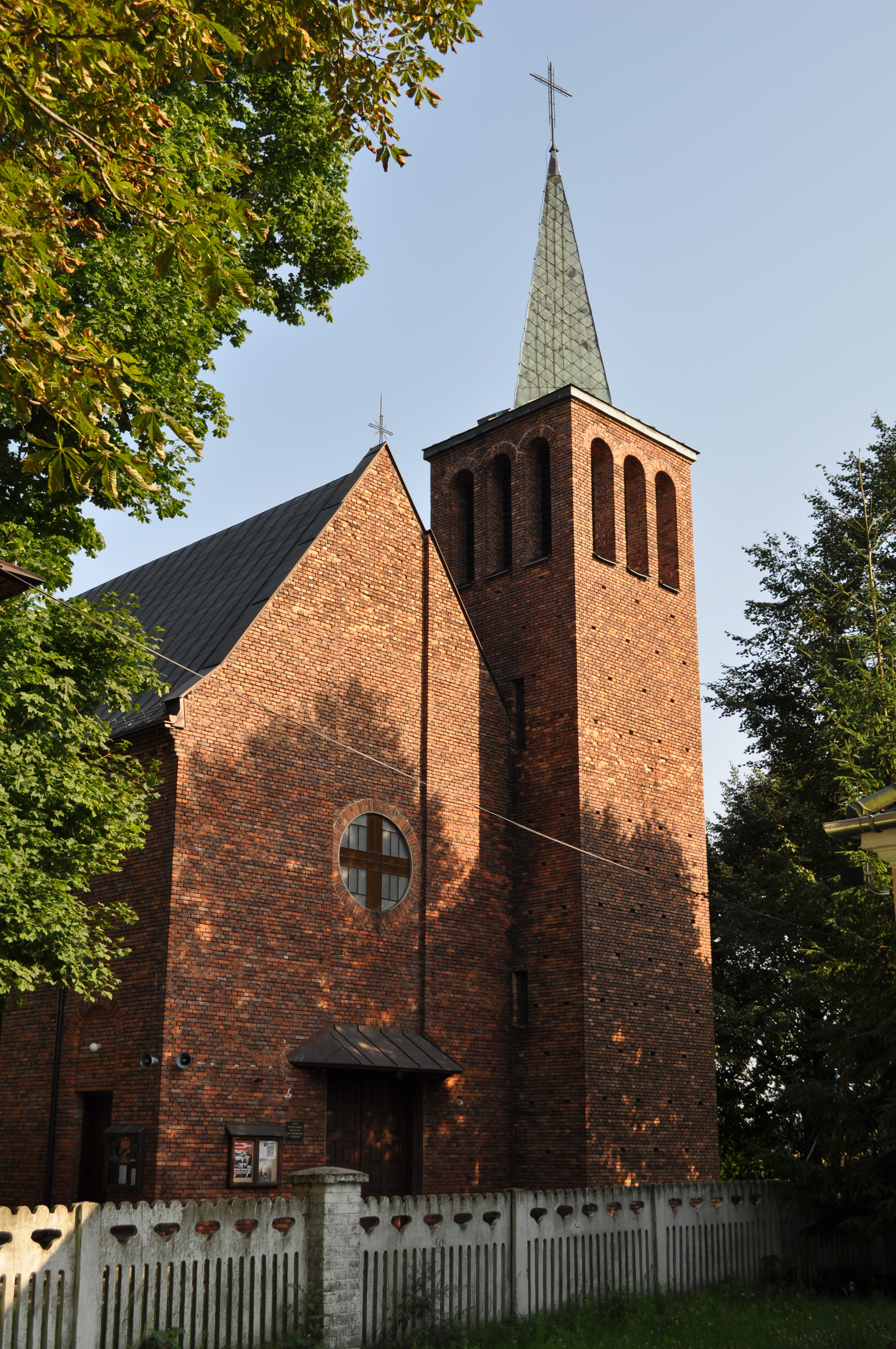
- Our Lady of Częstochowa church in Drochlin

- Location within Poland
- Coordinates: 50°43′N 19°38′E
- Country: Poland
- Voivodeship: Silesian
- County: Częstochowa
- Gmina: Lelów
- Population: 458
- Time zone: UTC+1 (CET)
  - Summer (DST): UTC+2 (CEST)
- Vehicle registration: SCZ

Drochlin [ˈdrɔxlin] is a village in the administrative district of Gmina Lelów, within Częstochowa County, Silesian Voivodeship, in southern Poland.

== History ==
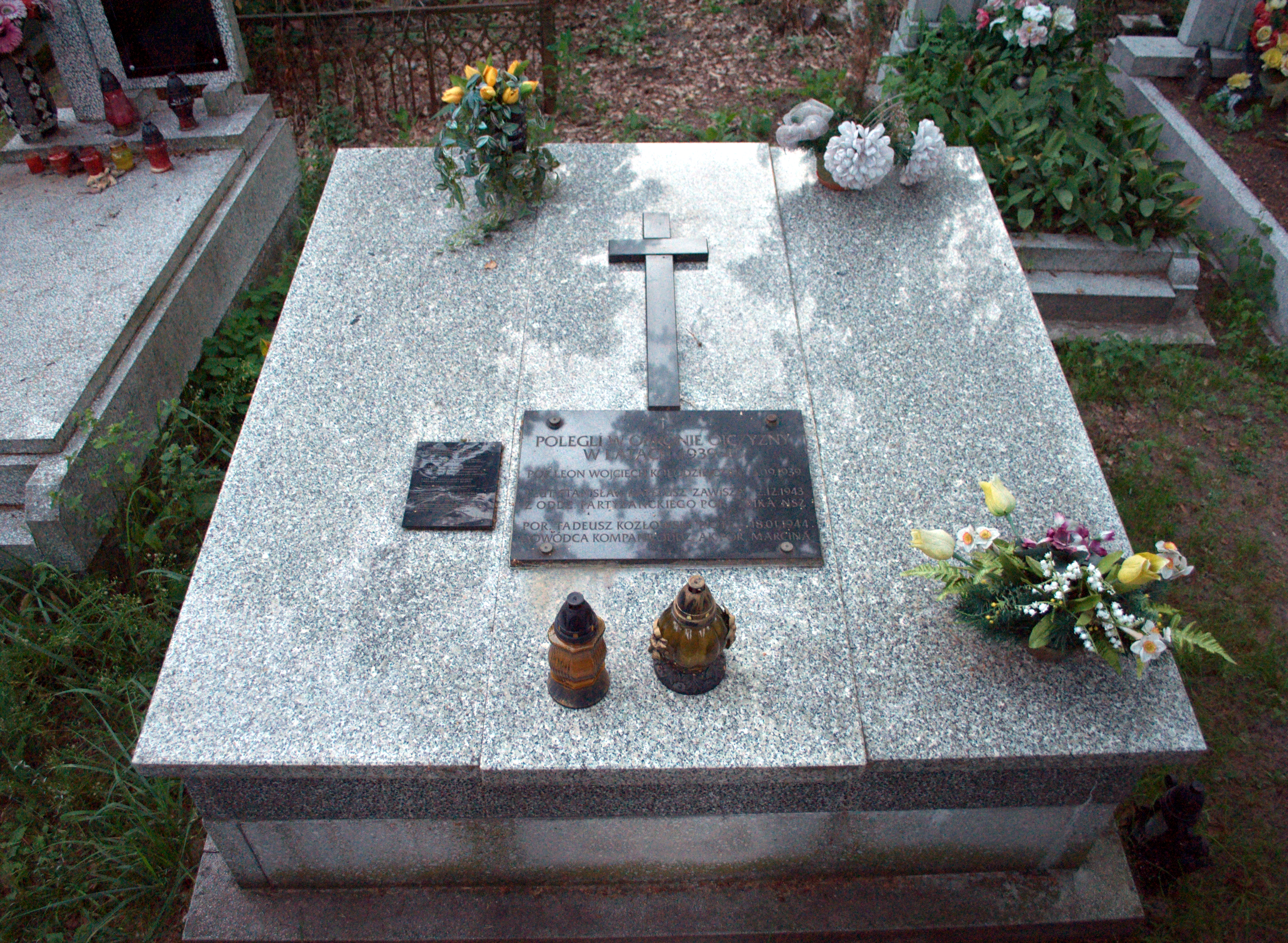
Grave of local Polish defenders and partisans killed during World War II

The first mention of the village occurred in 1373–74. During the Middle Ages the village belonged to the Chapter of the Roman Catholic Diocese of Kraków. There is a parish church named of Our Lady of Częstochowa. The original church, Saints Phillip and James, was built from wood and existed since 1470. After an unknown destruction, the next was built in 1728. That church had, from a bird's eye view, the shape of a cross. That church lasted until 1958, when it was demolished for structural reasons. Head priest Władysław Zachariasz oversaw its rebuild that lasted until 1967 and used light reddish-orange medium-sized exterior bricks. A similar wooden church still exists and can be seen in the neighboring village of Podlesie.

In the late 18th century, the village was annexed by Prussia during the Partitions of Poland. In 1807, it was regained by Poles and included in the short-lived Duchy of Warsaw, and following its dissolution in 1815, it fell to the Russian Partition of Poland. During the January Uprising, on September 28, 1863, the village was a place of concentration of two units of Polish insurgents and a unit of Hungarian volunteers, who two days later fought the Battle of Mełchów, in which they defeated Russian troops. Following World War I, in 1918, Poland regained independence and control of the village.

In the early 1970s there was a fire in the northwestern portion of the village. There a villager discovered an object that was later confirmed by archeology professors from the Jagiellonian University in Kraków. The object was a Roman Denarius dating from Hadrian's rule, 119-30 AD.
