= Battle of Mełchów =

- Part of the January Uprising
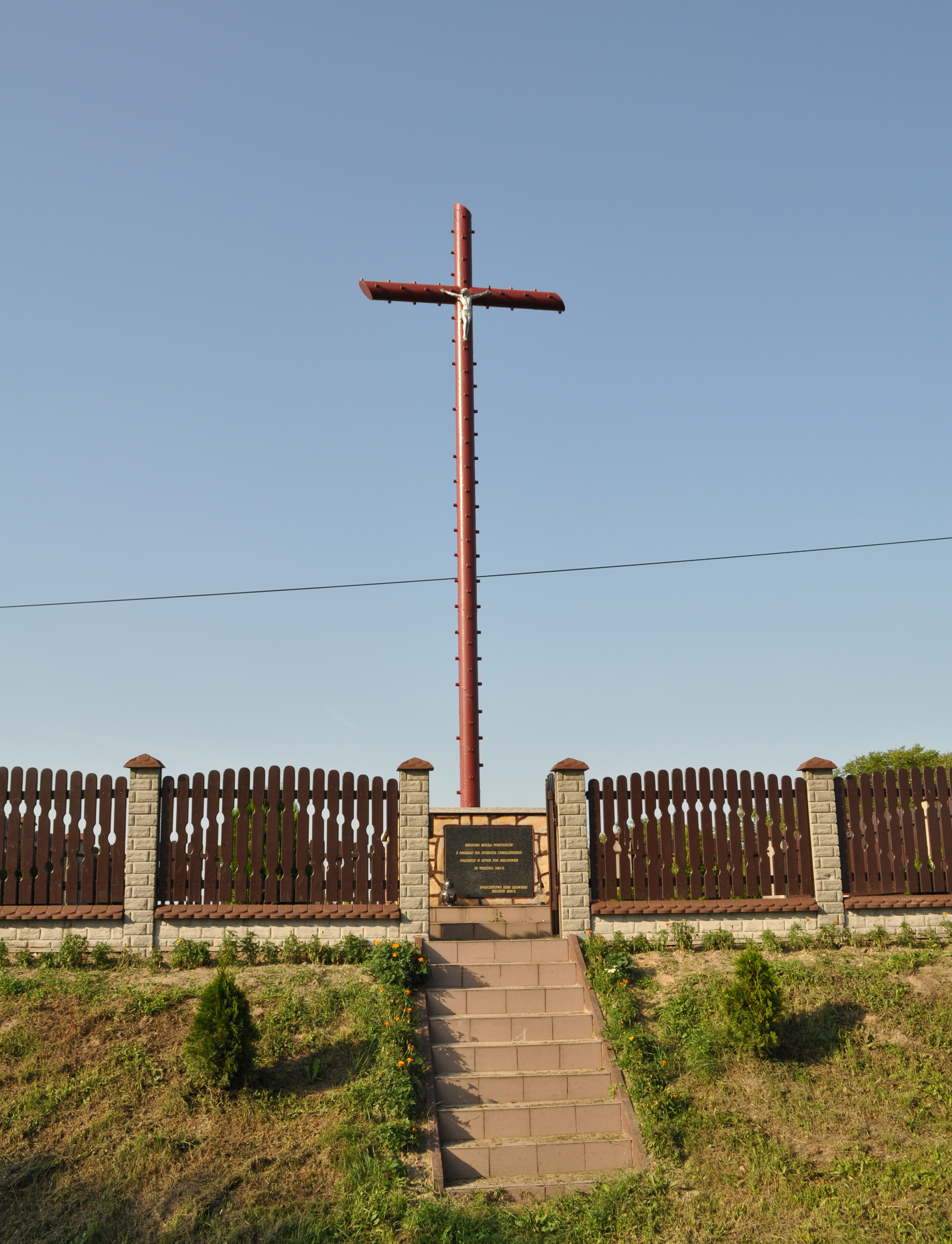
- Mass grave of insurgents fallen in the battle
Date	30 September 1863
Location	Mełchów
Result	Polish victory

Belligerents
(Poland) Polish insurgents (Hungary) Hungarian volunteers	Russian Empire

Commanders and leaders
(Poland) Zygmunt Chmieleński (Hungary) Albert Esterhazy † (Poland) Teofil Władyczański †	

Strength
800	

Casualties and losses
70 dead and wounded	100 dead

The Battle of Mełchów, one of many clashes of the January Uprising, took place on September 30, 1863, in the village of Mełchów (near Lelów), which at that time belonged to the Russian-controlled Congress Poland. A party of 800 Polish insurgents, commanded by Zygmunt Chmieleński, clashed with soldiers of the Imperial Russian Army. Russian losses were estimated at 100 killed, while Polish losses totaled 70 killed and wounded.

After skirmishes near Cierno, Warzyn and Czarnca, Chmieleński concentrated insurgent units in Drochlin, where he was joined by some riflemen of Captain Albert Esterhazy. When Russians found out about the insurgent camp, they sent there infantry, dragoons, Cossacks and two cannons. Polish forces had some 800 men, and the battle began with the Russian barrage of the village, after which infantry entered the fray. The Russian objective was to seize the local forest and then destroy the insurgent party. Chmieleński ordered his forces to halt the enemy and then sent the Polish cavalry in to counterattack. Due to the subsequent Russian artillery fire, the Polish advance was stopped. However, the insurgents regrouped and attacked again, this time with bayonets. Among those wounded during the cavalry charge was Adam Chmielowski.

The left insurgent wing under Captain Esterhazy repelled several counterattacks, but after Esterhazy's death, his units dispersed and began a retreat towards main insurgent forces. Soon afterwards Colonel Wladyczanski, commander of the right insurgent wing, was mortally wounded. The lack of both left- and right-side leaders forced Chmieleński to order all of this men to withdraw towards Lgoczanka. Russian soldiers, who were busy with looting villages in the area, did not chase the Poles.

== Sources ==
- Stefan Kieniewicz: Powstanie styczniowe. Warszawa: Państwowe Wydawnictwo Naukowe, 1983. ISBN 83-01-03652-4.
