= Celiny =

Celiny may refer to the following places:

- Celiny, Lesser Poland Voivodeship (south Poland)
- Celiny, Lublin Voivodeship (east Poland)
- Celiny, Gmina Bodzentyn in Świętokrzyskie Voivodeship (south-central Poland)
- Celiny, Gmina Chmielnik in Świętokrzyskie Voivodeship (south-central Poland)
- Celiny, Gmina Raków in Świętokrzyskie Voivodeship (south-central Poland)
- Celiny, Włoszczowa County in Świętokrzyskie Voivodeship (south-central Poland)
- Celiny, Częstochowa County in Silesian Voivodeship (south Poland)
- Celiny, Tarnowskie Góry County in Silesian Voivodeship (south Poland)
