= Gmina Janów =

Gmina Janów may refer to either of the following rural administrative districts in Poland:

- Gmina Janów, Silesian Voivodeship
- Gmina Janów, Podlaskie Voivodeship
