= Jan Wojciech Balicki =

Polish Catholic priest and educator (1869–1948)

Blessed Jan Wojciech Balicki
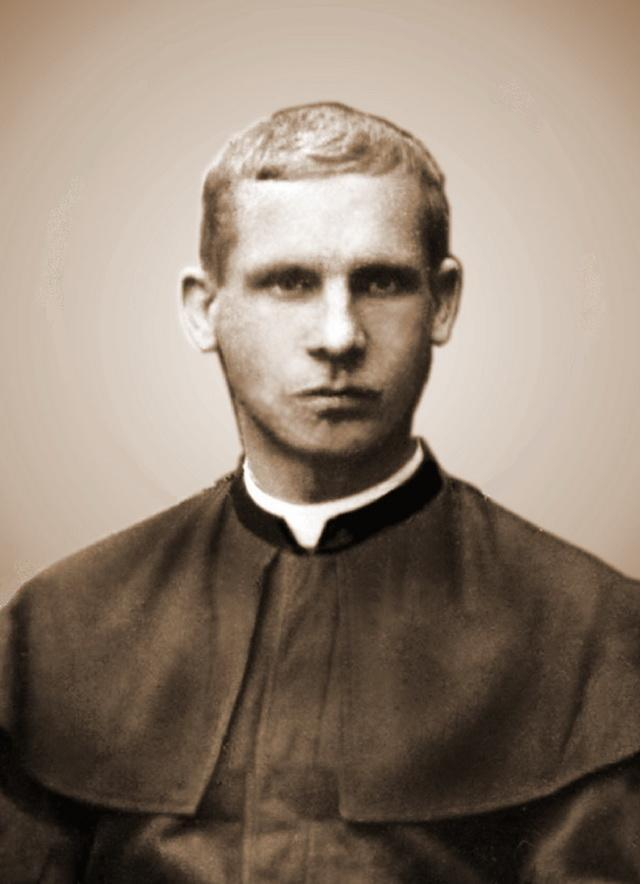
- Portrait of Balicki, c. 1892
- Born: 25 January 1869; Staromieście, Rzeszów, Vistula Land
- Died: 15 March 1948 (aged 79); Przemyśl, Poland
- Venerated in: Roman Catholic Church
- Beatified: 18 August 2002, Błonie Park, Kraków, Poland by Pope John Paul II
- Feast: 15 March

Jan Wojciech Balicki (25 January 1869 – 15 March 1948) was a Polish Roman Catholic priest who served as a spiritual director to seminarians in Poland around the time of World War II; he also acted in various leadership positions in the education of new priests and was noted for his intellectual gifts. He was beatified during the apostolic visit of Pope John Paul II to Poland on 18 August 2002. Karol Wojtiła had even written to Pope Paul VI in 1975 beseeching the latter to hold Balicki up as a model for priests of the modern era.

== Life ==
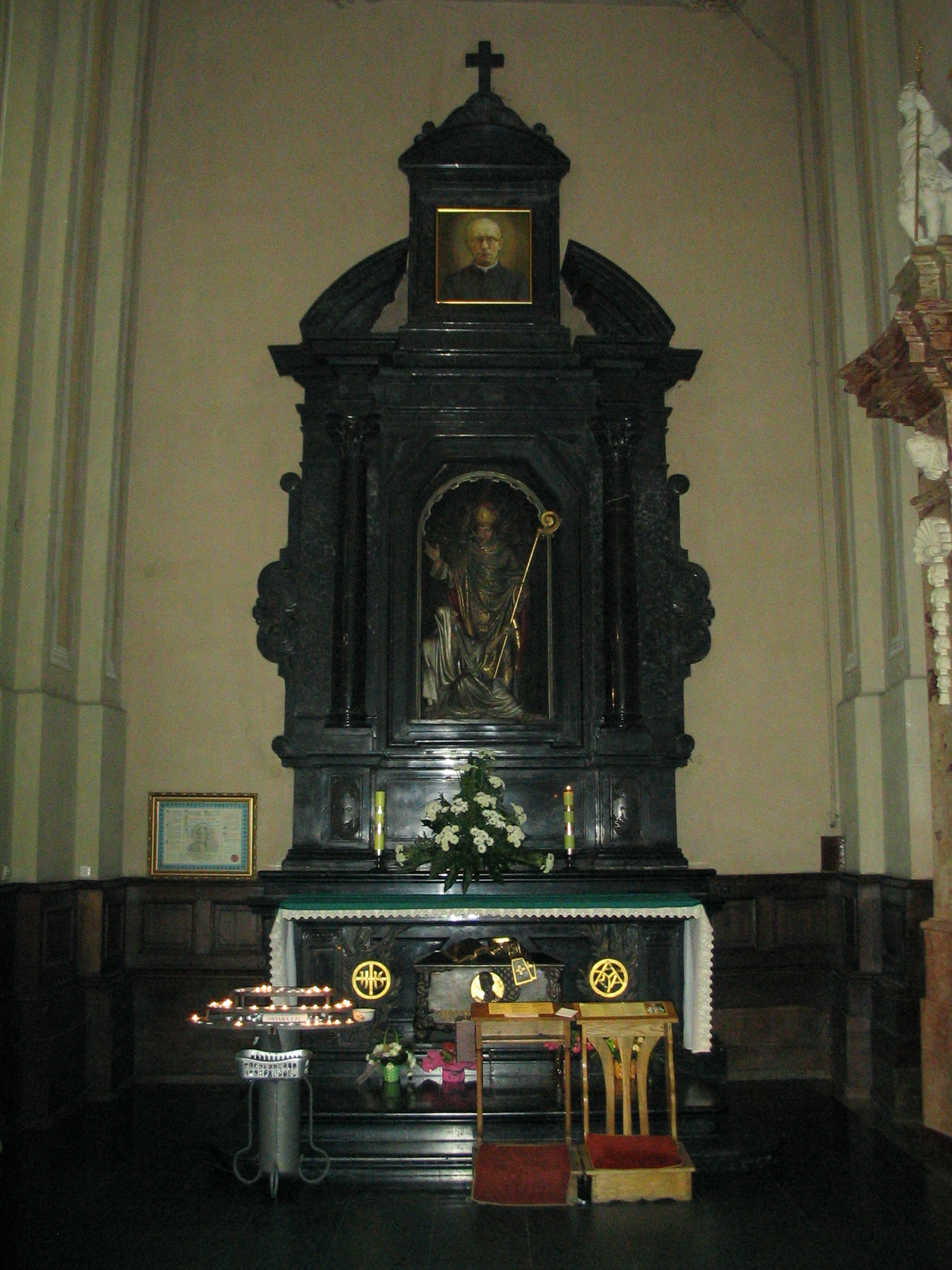
Altar in the Archcathedral Basilica of John the Baptist in Przemyśl containing relics of Balicki

Jan Wojciech Balicki was born in 1869 in Rzeszów to Mikołaja Balicki. During his childhood he underwent studies at school in Rzeszów from 1876 to 1888. He commenced his studies for the priesthood in September 1888.

Balicki was ordained to the priesthood on 20 July 1892 and was then sent to Polna where he was stationed for fifteen months, garnering a reputation as a gifted preacher, until he went for further studies at the Pontifical Gregorian University in Rome from 1893 until 1897. It was there that he graduated in philosophical studies and in canon law in addition to receiving a doctorate in his theological studies. It was also there that he studied and focused on Thomas Aquinas and during his free time went to the churches of the saints and the apostles — he also came to the realization that science could in fact also lead a man to God.

His return home saw him go back to where he studied as a priest and he taught dogmatic theological studies from 1897. He was made its prefect of studies and held the post until 1897 to 1900 and then later its vice-rector in 1927 until he was made the rector in 1928; he resigned all posts after a bout of ill health in 1934 but continued to live there. However Balicki continued to serve as a confessor and as a spiritual director to seminarians. Among those that he had taught were the Bb. Władysław Findysz (also serving as his spiritual aide) and Stanislaus Kolodziej.

In the second half of February 1948 he was diagnosed with bilateral pneumonia and tuberculosis in its advanced stage. Balicki died in hospital on 15 March 1948 of both tuberculosis and pneumonia and is buried in the Cathedral of the Assumption of the Blessed Virgin Mary and St. John the Baptist.

=== Legacy ===
On 22 December 1975, the Archbishop of Kraków Cardinal Karol Józef Wojtyła – the future Pope John Paul II – wrote to Pope Paul VI asking the pontiff to hold Balicki up as a model for priests in the modern era.

== Cultivation of the spiritual life ==
Balicki wrote an extensive treatise of mystical prayer that consisted of four degrees:

- Prayer of quiet
- Prayer of simple union
- Ecstatic union
- Perfect union

He also provided a list of seven steps for the progress of all people in the spiritual life:

- A serious approach to life
- A readiness to be critical of self
- Unshakable confidence in prayer
- Joy of spirit
- Love for suffering
- Praise of divine mercy
- Continuous self amendment

== Beatification ==
The process for Balicki's beatification commenced in a diocesan process that opened on 22 July 1959 and continued its business until 22 November 1963; the process saw the accumulation of documentation pertaining to his life and also heard from a range of witnesses that could attest to the beatification in the affirmative. His writings received full approval on 3 May 1974 — thus incorporated into the cause — as a means of evaluating his beliefs and to ensure his writings did not conflict with the magisterium of the universal church.

These processes took place despite the fact that the Congregation for the Causes of Saints did not grant its formal approval to the initiation of the cause until 19 June 1982 — this act designated Balicki as a Servant of God. Another process was then held to continue the work of the first and both processes received ratification as having done their work on 21 June 1991 in Rome.

The postulation then compiled the positio to Rome in 1992. The theologians in Rome approved the cause on 24 June 1994 and the Congregation for the Causes of Saints followed suit on 8 November 1994. On 15 December 1994 Balicki was proclaimed to be venerable after Pope John Paul II decreed that Balicki had lived a life of heroic virtue. The approval of a miracle attributed to Balicki's intercession allowed for the pontiff to preside over the beatification on 18 August 2002 in Poland. The postulator assigned to the cause is Roman Chowaniec.
