= Gmina Lelów =

Gmina Lelów Lelów Commune
- Gmina
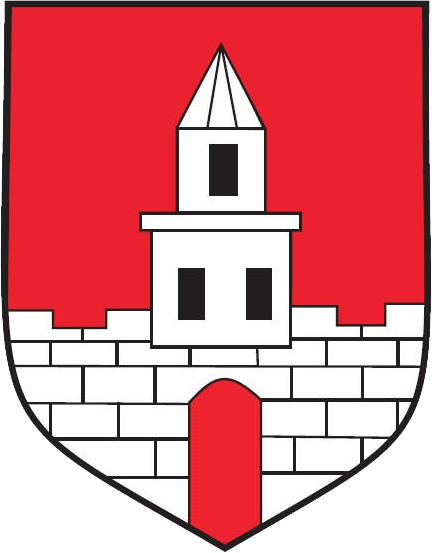
- Coat of arms
- Interactive map of Gmina Lelów
- Coordinates (Lelów): 50°40′57″N 19°37′31″E
- Country: Poland
- Voivodeship: Silesian
- County: Częstochowa
- Seat: Lelów

Area
  - Total: 120.81 km^{2} (46.65 sq mi)

Population (2019-06-30)
  - Total: 4,847
  - Density: 40.12/km^{2} (103.9/sq mi)
- Website: https://www.lelow.pl/

Gmina Lelów is a rural gmina (administrative district) in Częstochowa County, Silesian Voivodeship, in southern Poland. Its seat is the village of Lelów, which lies approximately 39 kilometres (24 mi) east of Częstochowa and 66 km (41 mi) north-east of the regional capital Katowice.

The gmina covers an area of 120.81 square kilometres (46.6 sq mi), and as of 2019 its total population is 4,847.

== Villages ==
Gmina Lelów contains the villages and settlements of Biała Wielka, Celiny, Drochlin, Gródek, Konstantynów, Lelów, Lgota Błotna, Lgota Gawronna, Mełchów, Nakło, Paulinów, Podlesie, Posłoda, Skrajniwa, Ślęzany, Staromieście and Turzyn.

== Neighbouring gminas ==
Gmina Lelów is bordered by the gminas of Irządze, Janów, Koniecpol, Niegowa, Przyrów and Szczekociny.
