= Lgota Błotna =

- Village
- Location within Poland
- Coordinates: 50°41′18″N 19°33′50″E
- Country: Poland
- Voivodeship: Silesian
- County: Częstochowa
- Gmina: Lelów

Lgota Błotna [ˈlɡɔta ˈbwɔtna] is a village in the administrative district of Gmina Lelów, within Częstochowa County, Silesian Voivodeship, in southern Poland.
