= Biała Wielka =

- Village
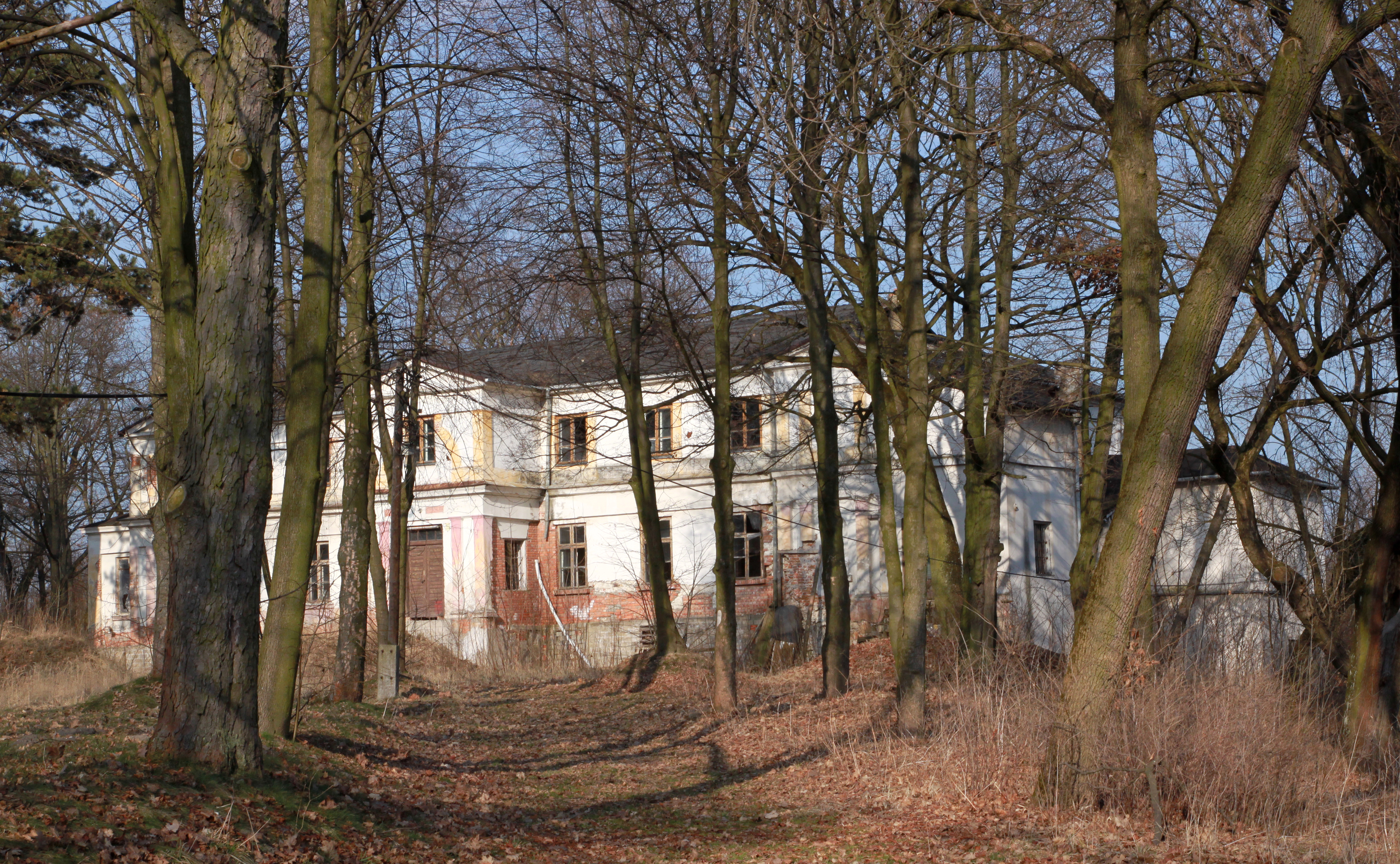
- Manor in Biała Wielka

- Location within Poland
- Coordinates: 50°41′N 19°40′E
- Country: Poland
- Voivodeship: Silesian
- County: Częstochowa
- Gmina: Lelów

Population
  - Total: 445

Biała Wielka [ˈbjawa ˈvjɛlka] is a village in the administrative district of Gmina Lelów, within Częstochowa County, Silesian Voivodeship, in southern Poland.
