= Sokole Pole =

- Village
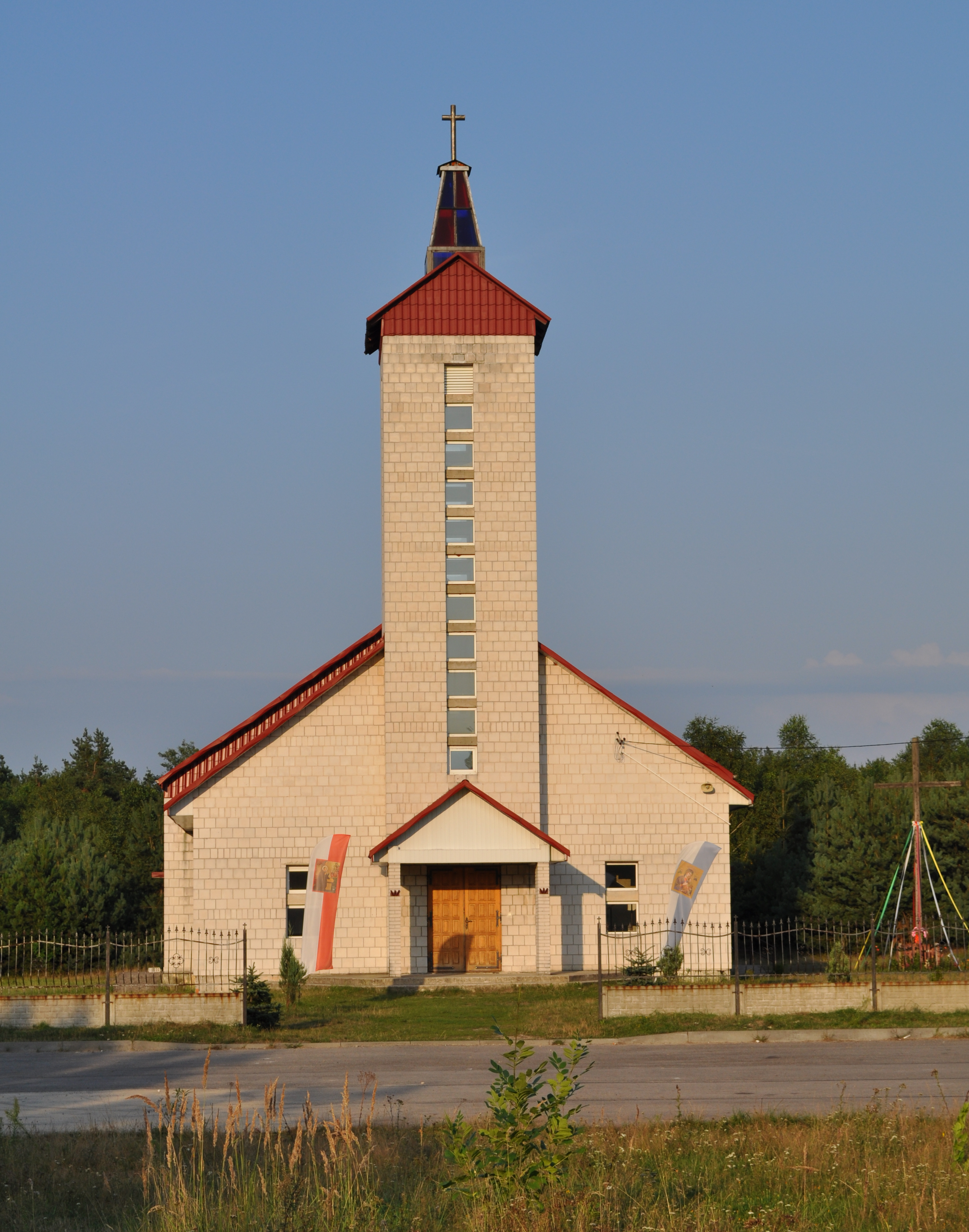
- Church

- Location within Poland
- Coordinates: 50°42′N 19°32′E
- Country: Poland
- Voivodeship: Silesian
- County: Częstochowa
- Gmina: Janów
- Population: 118

Sokole Pole [sɔˈkɔlɛ ˈpɔlɛ] is a village in the administrative district of Gmina Janów, within Częstochowa County, Silesian Voivodeship, in southern Poland.
