= Turzyn, Silesian Voivodeship =

Turzyn
- Village
- Location within Poland
- Coordinates: 50°39′N 19°38′E
- Country: Poland
- Voivodeship: Silesian
- County: Częstochowa
- Gmina: Lelów
- Population: 351

Turzyn [ˈtuʐɨn] is a village in the administrative district of Gmina Lelów, within Częstochowa County, Silesian Voivodeship, in southern Poland.
