= Apolonka, Silesian Voivodeship =

Apolonka
- Village
- Location within Poland
- Coordinates: 50°42′N 19°29′E
- Country: Poland
- Voivodeship: Silesian
- County: Częstochowa
- Gmina: Janów
- Population: 68
- Time zone: UTC+1 (CET)
  - Summer (DST): UTC+2 (CEST)
- Vehicle registration: SCZ

Apolonka [apɔˈlɔnka] is a village in the administrative district of Gmina Janów, within Częstochowa County, Silesian Voivodeship, in southern Poland.

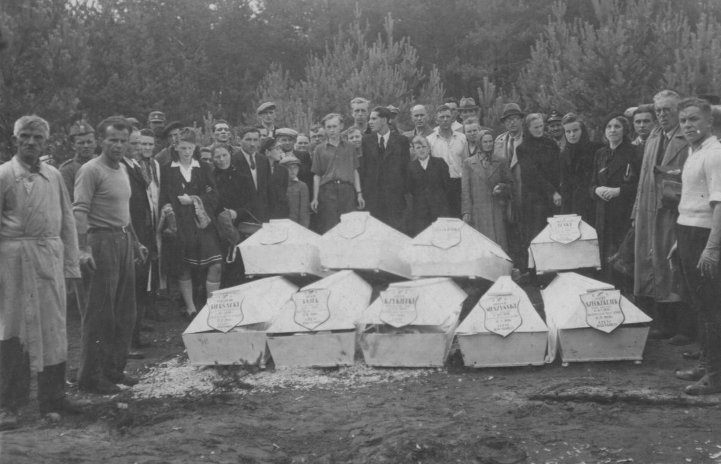
Exhumation of the bodies of the victims of the 1940 German-perpetrated massacre in Apolonka (1946)

During the German occupation (World War II), in June and July 1940, the German police committed three massacres of around 60 Poles from nearby Częstochowa in the village (see Nazi crimes against the Polish nation). Among the victims were 20 girl scouts.
