= Mełchów =

- Village
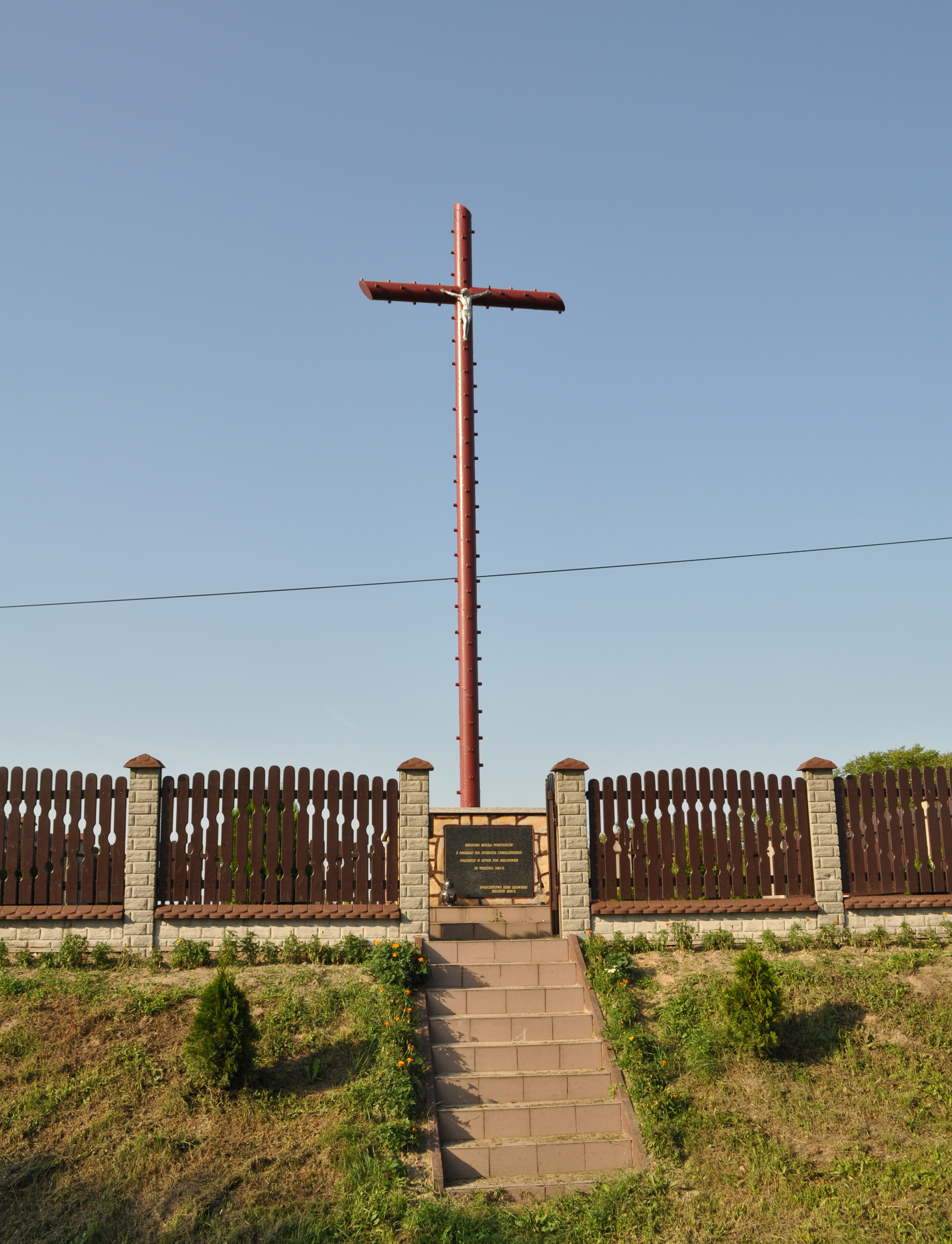
- Mass grave of insurgents fallen in the Battle of Mełchów in 1863

- Location within Poland
- Coordinates: 50°43′N 19°35′E
- Country: Poland
- Voivodeship: Silesian
- County: Częstochowa
- Gmina: Lelów
- Population: 105
- Time zone: UTC+1 (CET)
  - Summer (DST): UTC+2 (CEST)
- Vehicle registration: SCZ

Mełchów [ˈmɛu̯xuf] is a village in the administrative district of Gmina Lelów, within Częstochowa County, Silesian Voivodeship, in southern Poland.

During the January Uprising, on 30 September 1863, the Battle of Mełchów was fought near the village. In the battle, Polish insurgents supported by Hungarian volunteers defeated Russian troops.
