= Hucisko, Częstochowa County =

Hucisko
- Village
- Location within Poland
- Coordinates: 50°41′37″N 19°30′01″E
- Country: Poland
- Voivodeship: Silesian
- County: Częstochowa
- Gmina: Janów
- Population: 27

Hucisko [xuˈt͡ɕiskɔ] is a village in the administrative district of Gmina Janów, within Częstochowa County, Silesian Voivodeship, in southern Poland.
