= Janów, Silesian Voivodeship =

Janów
- Town
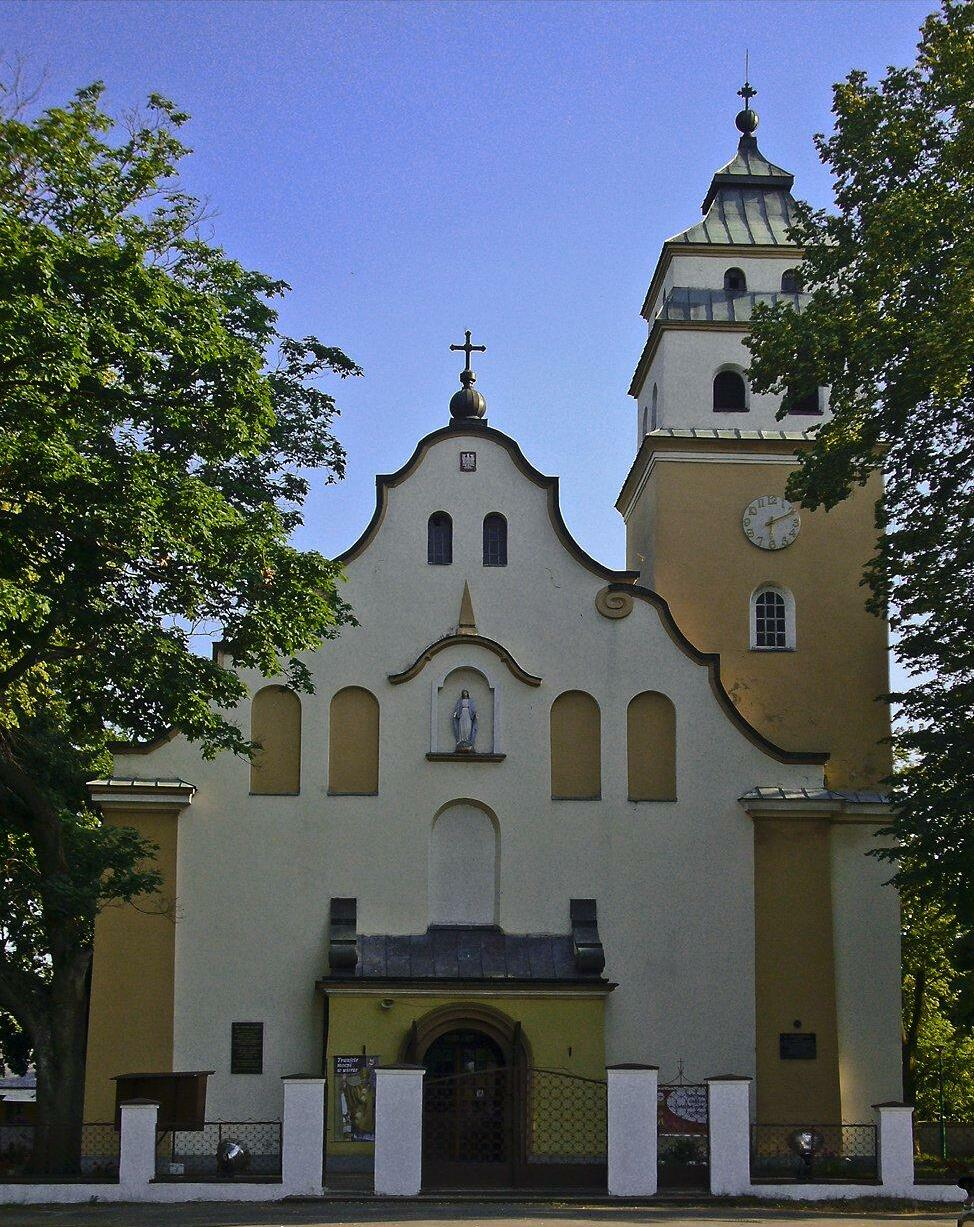
- Church of the Immaculate Conception of the Virgin Mary

- Coat of arms

- Location within Poland
- Coordinates: 50°43′19″N 19°26′10″E
- Country: Poland
- Voivodeship: Silesian
- County: Częstochowa
- Gmina: Janów
- Founded: 17th century
- Town rights: 1698
- Founder: Jan Aleksander Koniecpolski
- Named for: Jan Aleksander Koniecpolski

Population
  - Total: 964
- Time zone: UTC+1 (CET)
  - Summer (DST): UTC+2 (CEST)
- Vehicle registration: SCZ

Janów [ˈjanuf] is a town in Częstochowa County, Silesian Voivodeship, in southern Poland. It is the seat of the gmina (administrative district) called Gmina Janów.

== History ==
The town was founded by Jan Aleksander Koniecpolski in the 17th century. It was named after the founder. It was granted town rights in 1698. It was private town of the Koniecpolski, Potocki and Krasiński families.

Following the German-Soviet invasion of Poland, which started World War II in September 1939, Janów was occupied by Germany until 1945.
