= Siedlec, Gmina Janów =

Siedlec
- Village
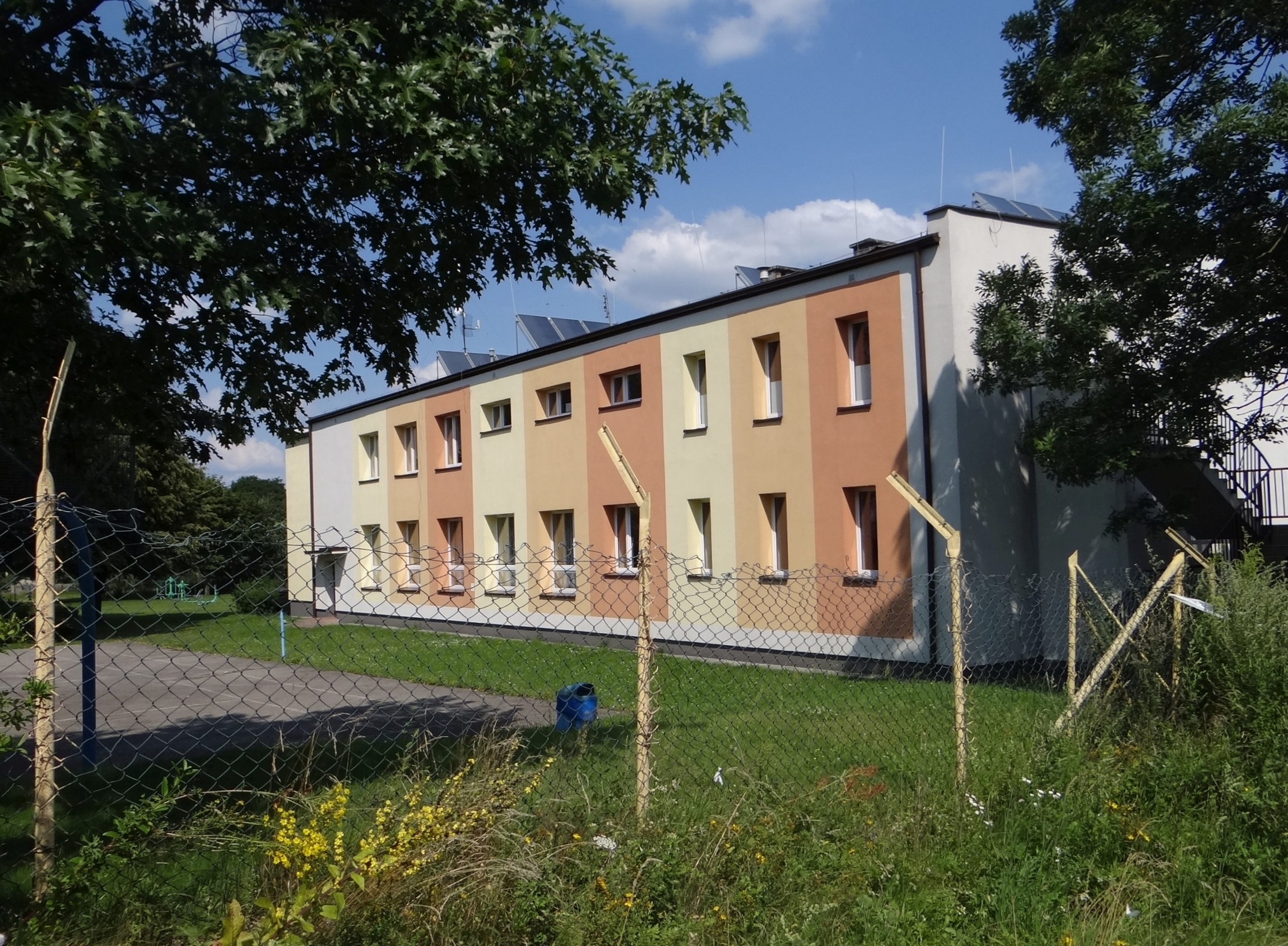

- Location within Poland
- Coordinates: 50°41′N 19°21′E
- Country: Poland
- Voivodeship: Silesian
- County: Częstochowa
- Gmina: Janów
- Population: 506

Siedlec [ˈɕɛdlɛt͡s] is a village in the administrative district of Gmina Janów, within Częstochowa County, Silesian Voivodeship, in southern Poland.

The Siedlec Desert is located near the village.
