= Złoty Potok, Silesian Voivodeship =

Złoty Potok
- Village
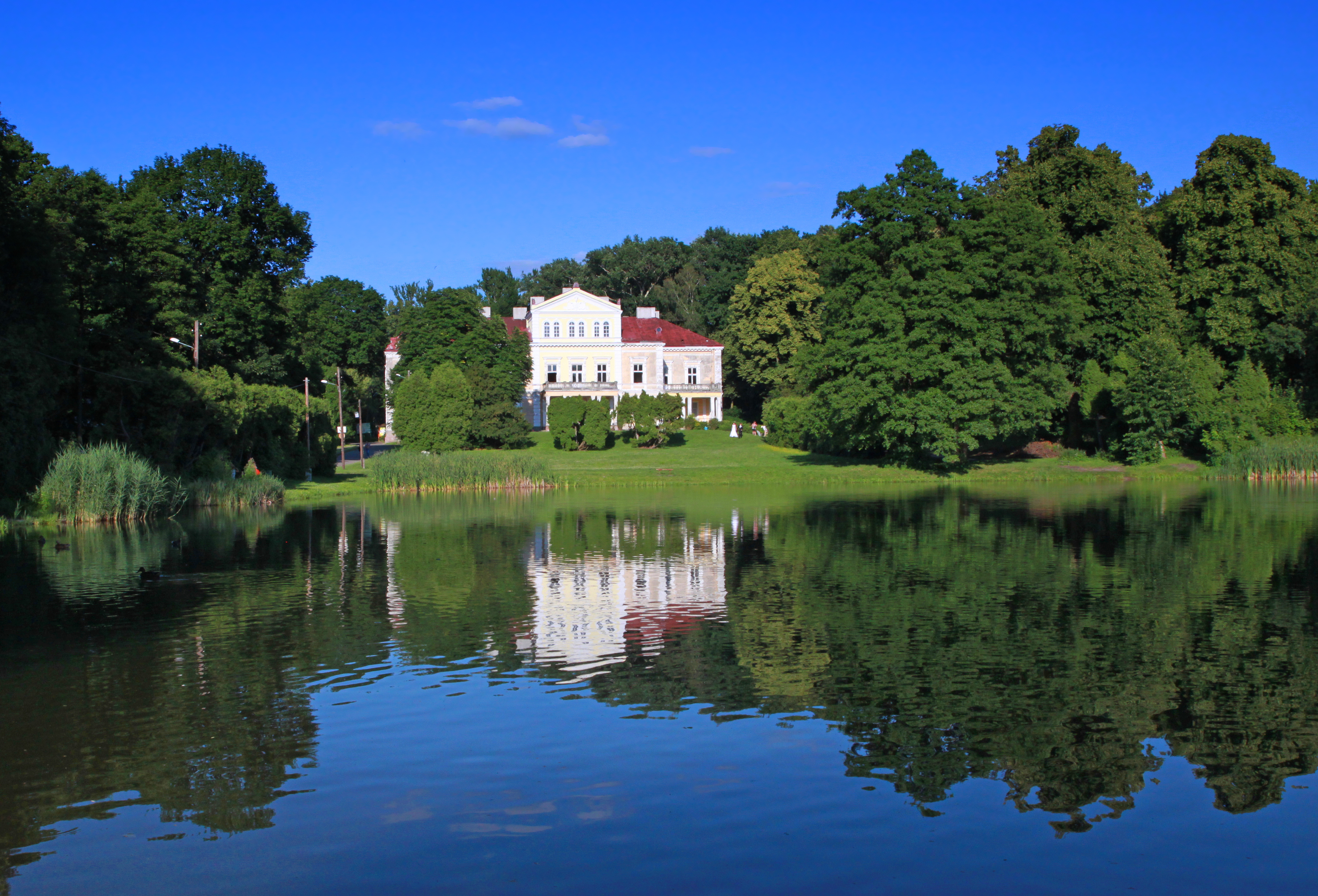
- Raczyński Palace and Park in Złoty Potok

- Location within Poland
- Coordinates: 50°42′25″N 19°25′53″E
- Country: Poland
- Voivodeship: Silesian
- County: Częstochowa
- Gmina: Janów
- Population: 1,101
- Time zone: UTC+1 (CET)
  - Summer (DST): UTC+2 (CEST)
- Vehicle registration: SCZ
- Website: http://www.janow.pl

Złoty Potok [ˈzwɔtɨ ˈpɔtɔk] is a village in the administrative district of Gmina Janów, within Częstochowa County, Silesian Voivodeship, in southern Poland.

The village is a popular destination for Polish tourists during the summer months, as it hosts major festivals such as the International Folk Festival and Lato Filmowe (Summer of Movies).

== History and sights ==
The settlement dates back to the Early Middle Ages. It was the site of an early medieval stronghold of the Polish tribes, which is now an archaeological site. It became part of the emerging Polish state in the 10th century.

In the 19th century a palace by Raczyński family, and a mansion of Krasiński family, were built here. In the Krasińscy mansion there is a museum dedicated to the Polish poet Zygmunt Krasiński.

The village church dates from the mid 13th century, is among the oldest in Poland.

In September 1939, during the German invasion of Poland, which started World War II, German troops massacred a group of Polish boy scouts from Złoty Potok in Tucznawa (see Nazi crimes against the Polish nation). The village was afterwards occupied by Germany until 1945. On September 11, 1944, Złoty Potok was the site of a battle between the Polish underground resistance and the occupying German forces. On September 17, 1944, during the Warsaw Uprising, the Germans carried out deportations of Varsovians from the Dulag 121 camp in Pruszków, where they were initially imprisoned, to Złoty Potok. Those Poles were mainly old people, ill people and women with children.

== Sports ==
The Polish Cyclo-cross Championships were held in Złoty Potok in 1999, 2003 and 2008.

== Gallery ==
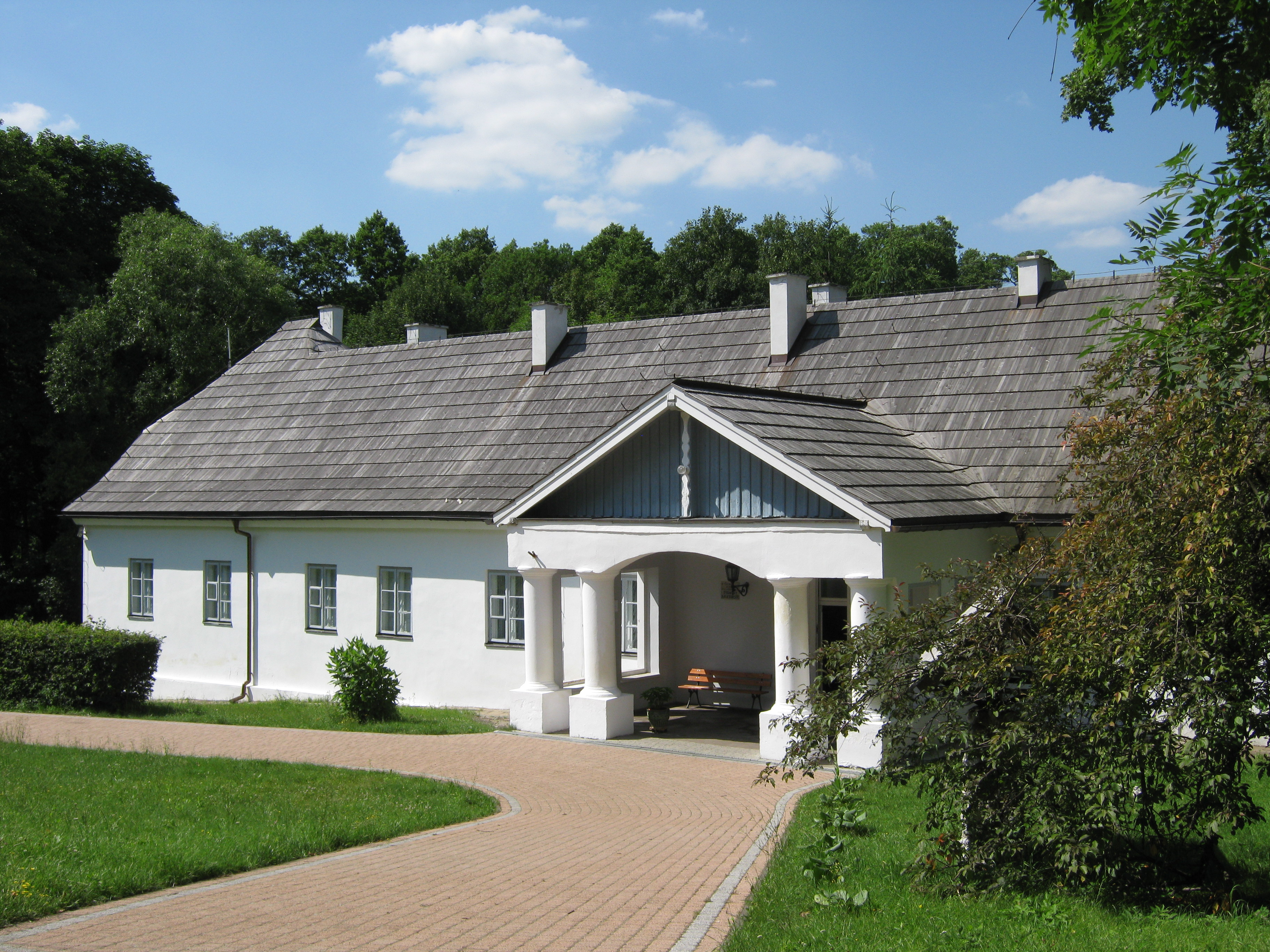
Krasiński Mansion, now a museum

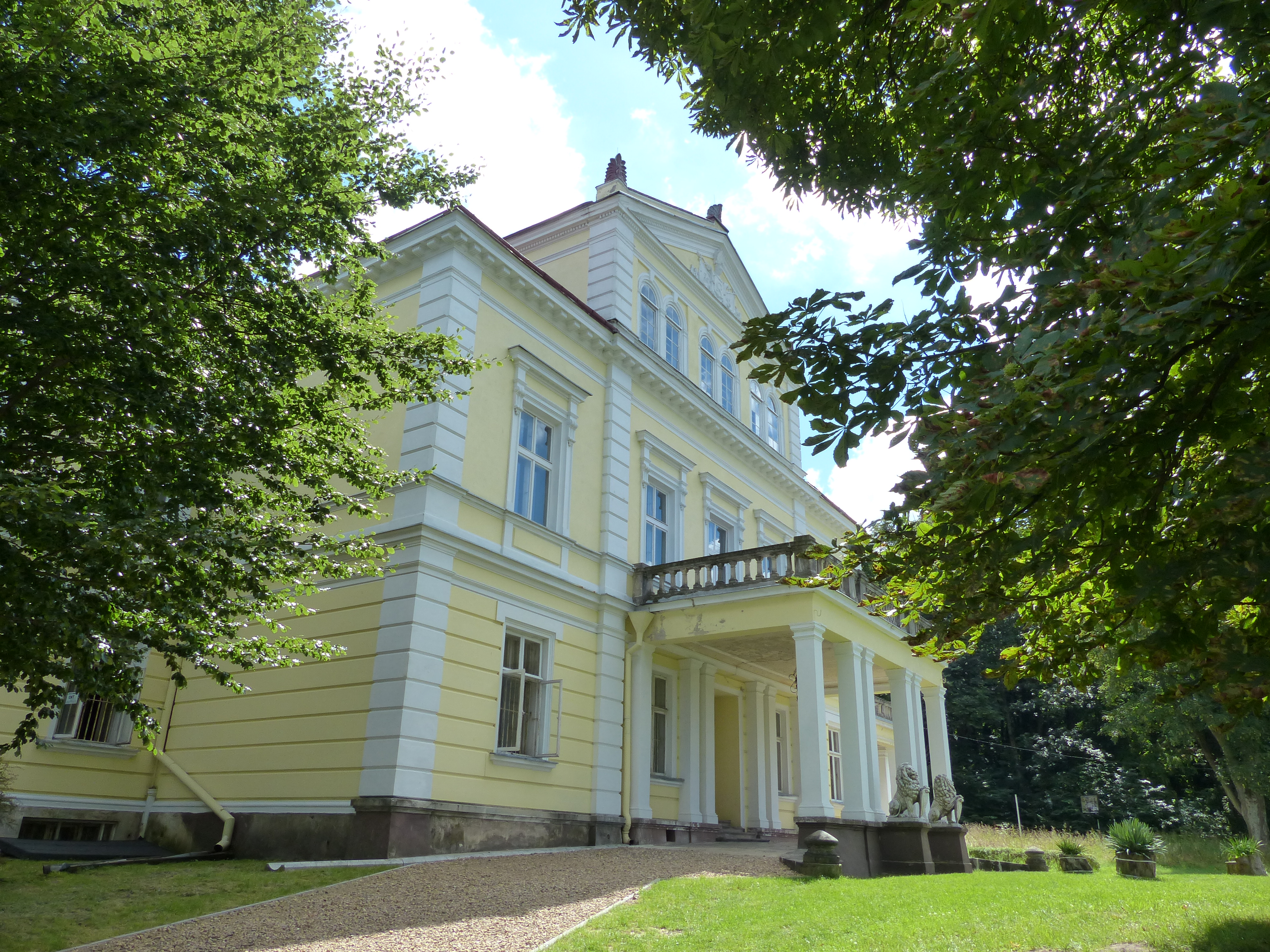
Raczyński Palace

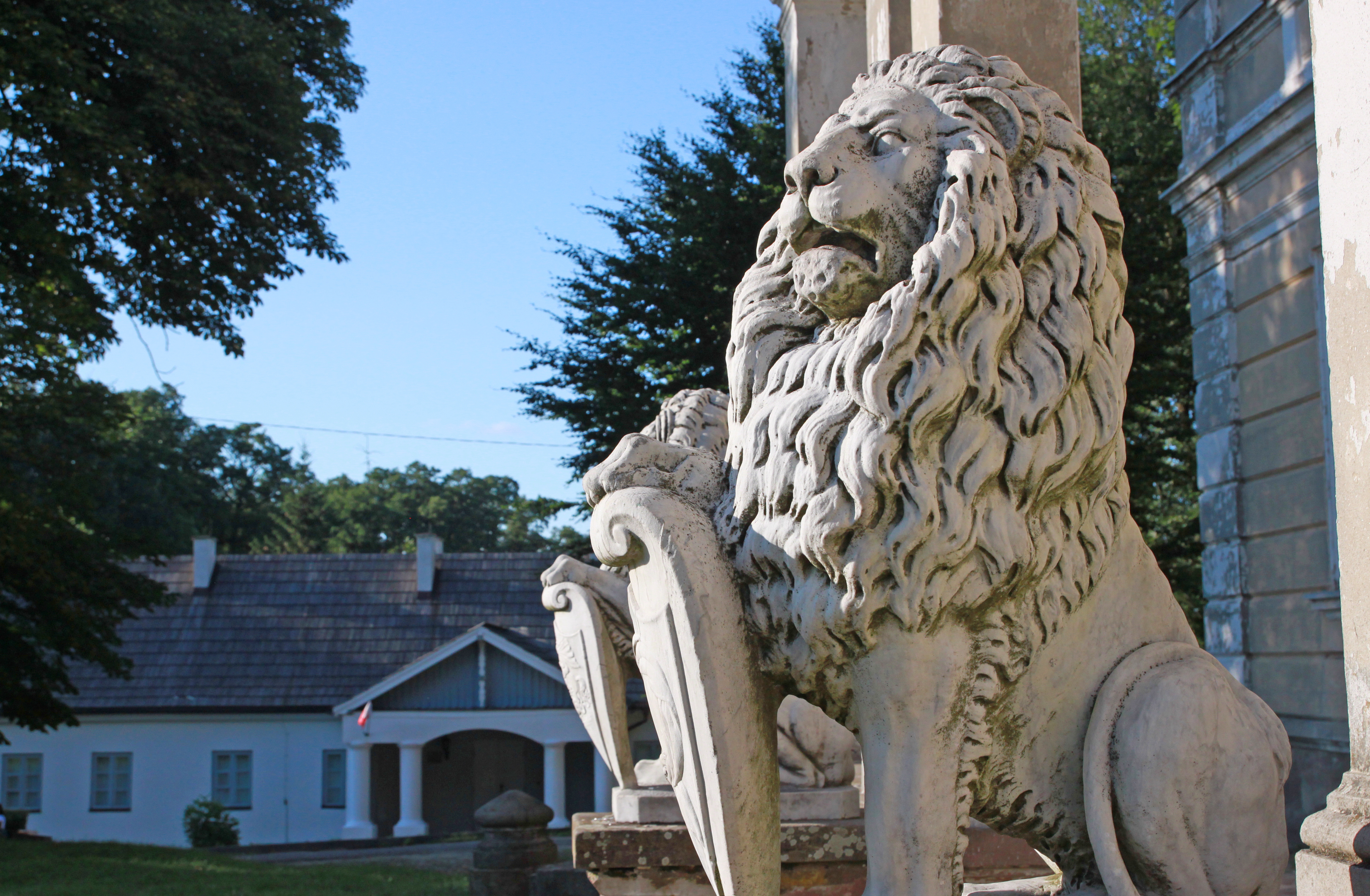
Statues of lions at the entrance to the Raczyński Palace

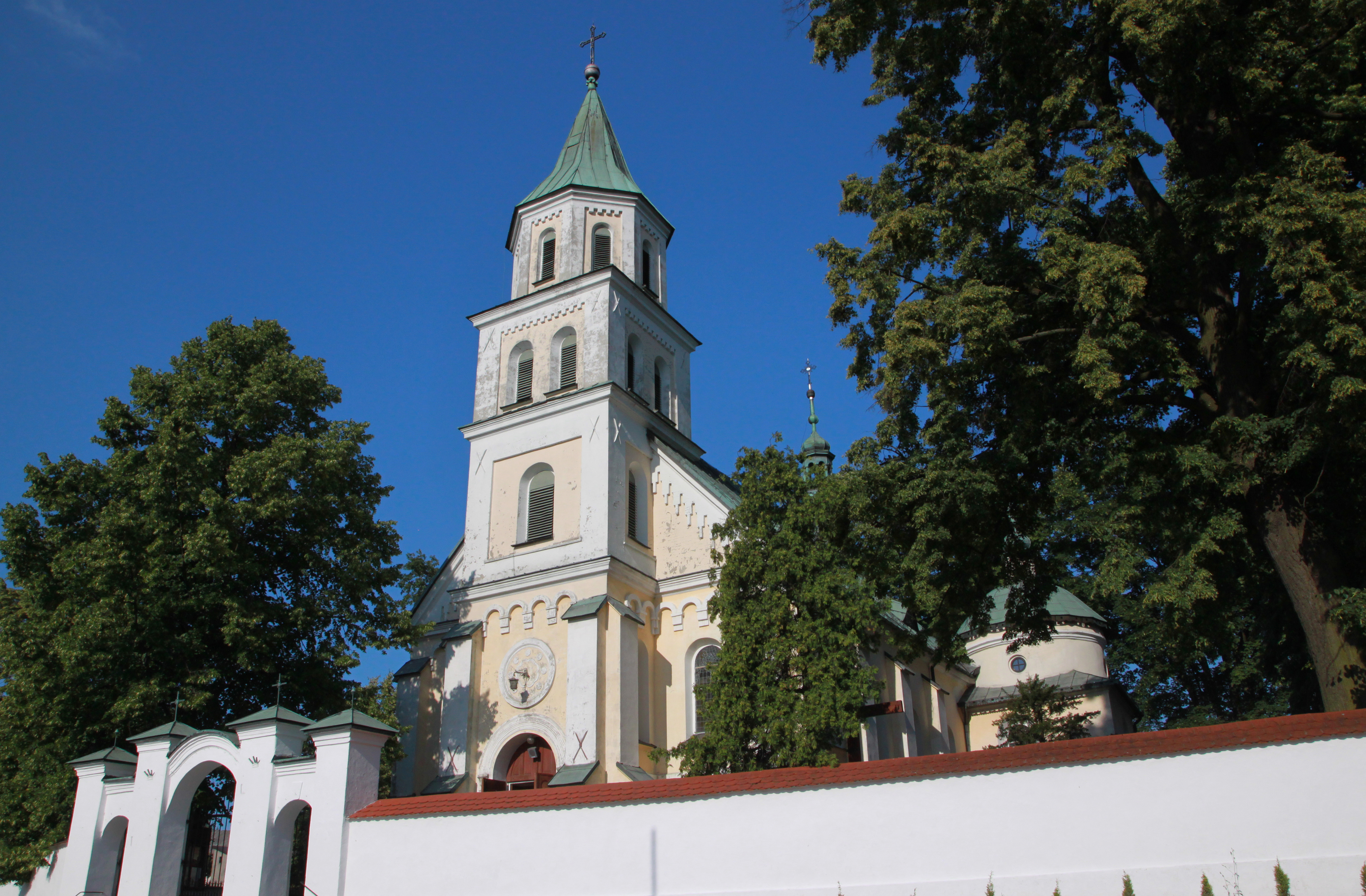
Saint John the Baptist church
