= Żuraw, Silesian Voivodeship =

Żuraw
- Village
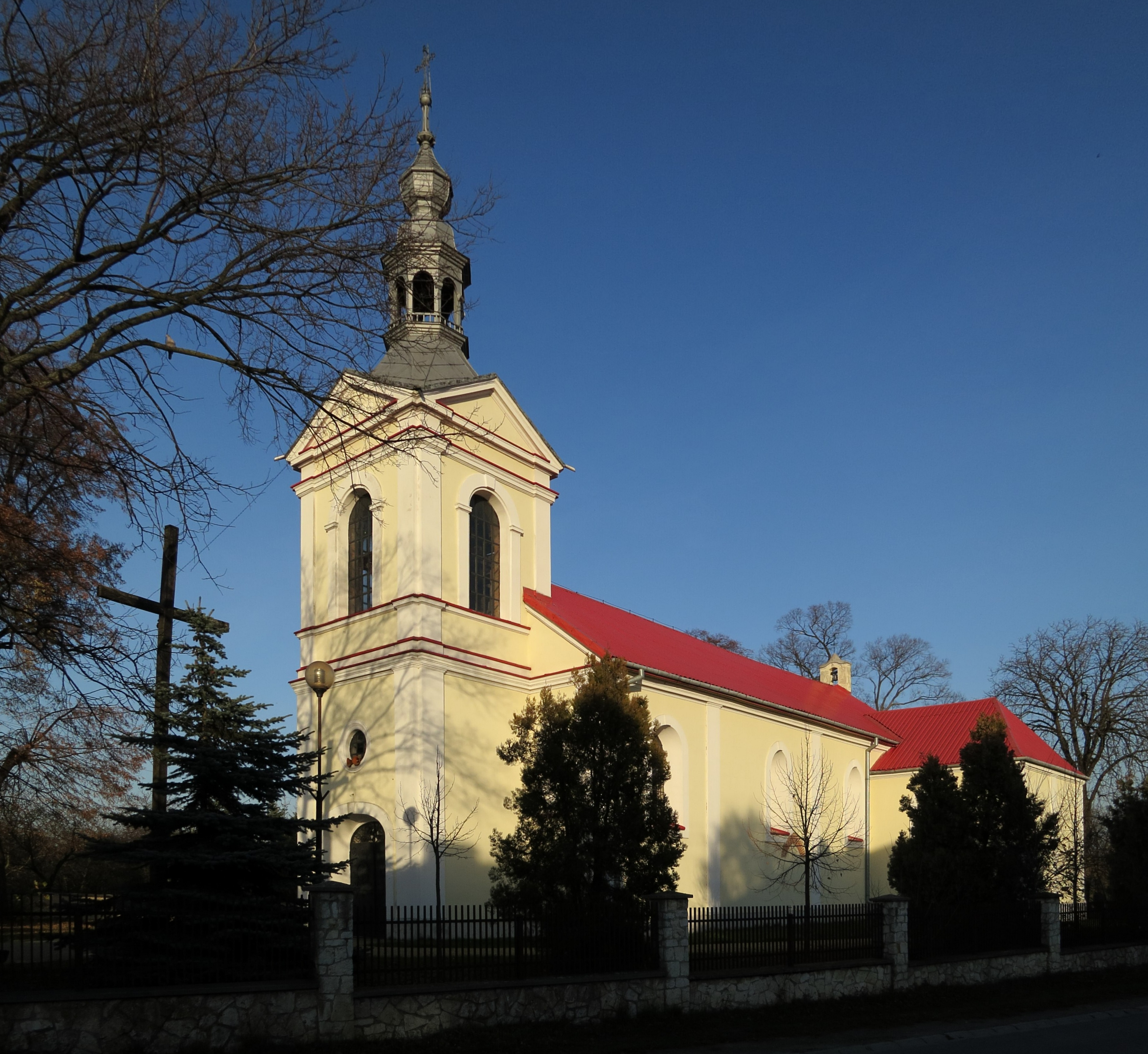
- Saint Bartholomew church

- Location within Poland
- Coordinates: 50°47′N 19°24′E
- Country: Poland
- Voivodeship: Silesian
- County: Częstochowa
- Gmina: Janów
- Population: 443
- Website: http://pwzuraw.w.interia.pl/

Żuraw [ˈʐuraf] is a village in the administrative district of Gmina Janów, within Częstochowa County, Silesian Voivodeship, in southern Poland.
