= Lgota Gawronna =

- Village
- Location within Poland
- Coordinates: 50°39′N 19°34′E
- Country: Poland
- Voivodeship: Silesian
- County: Częstochowa
- Gmina: Lelów
- Population: 135

Lgota Gawronna [ˈlɡɔta ɡaˈvrɔnna] is a village in the administrative district of Gmina Lelów, within Częstochowa County, Silesian Voivodeship, in southern Poland.
