= Śmiertny Dąb =

- Village
- Location within Poland
- Coordinates: 50°45′1″N 19°26′38″E
- Country: Poland
- Voivodeship: Silesian
- County: Częstochowa
- Gmina: Janów
- Population: 87

Śmiertny Dąb [ˈɕmjɛrtnɨ ˈdɔmp] is a village in the administrative district of Gmina Janów, within Częstochowa County, Silesian Voivodeship, in southern Poland.
