= Konstantynów, Silesian Voivodeship =

Konstantynów
- Village
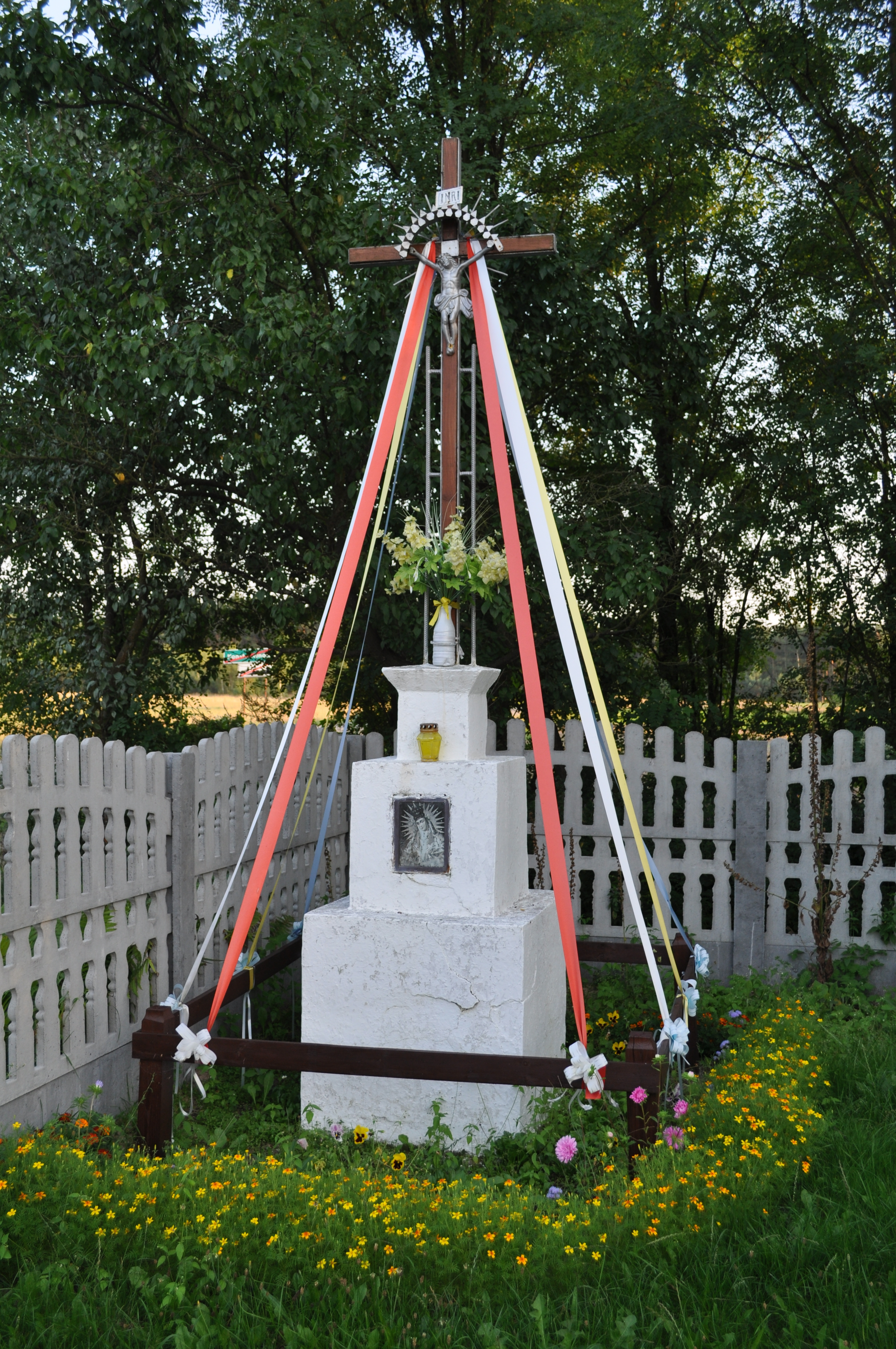
- Shrine

- Location within Poland
- Coordinates: 50°44′N 19°33′E
- Country: Poland
- Voivodeship: Silesian
- County: Częstochowa
- Gmina: Lelów
- Population: 96

Konstantynów [kɔnstanˈtɨnuf] is a village in the administrative district of Gmina Lelów, within Częstochowa County, Silesian Voivodeship, in southern Poland.
