= Tucznawa =

District of Dąbrowa Górnicza in Silesian Voivodeship, Poland

Coordinates: 50.389722°N 19.312778°E

- District of Dąbrowa Górnicza
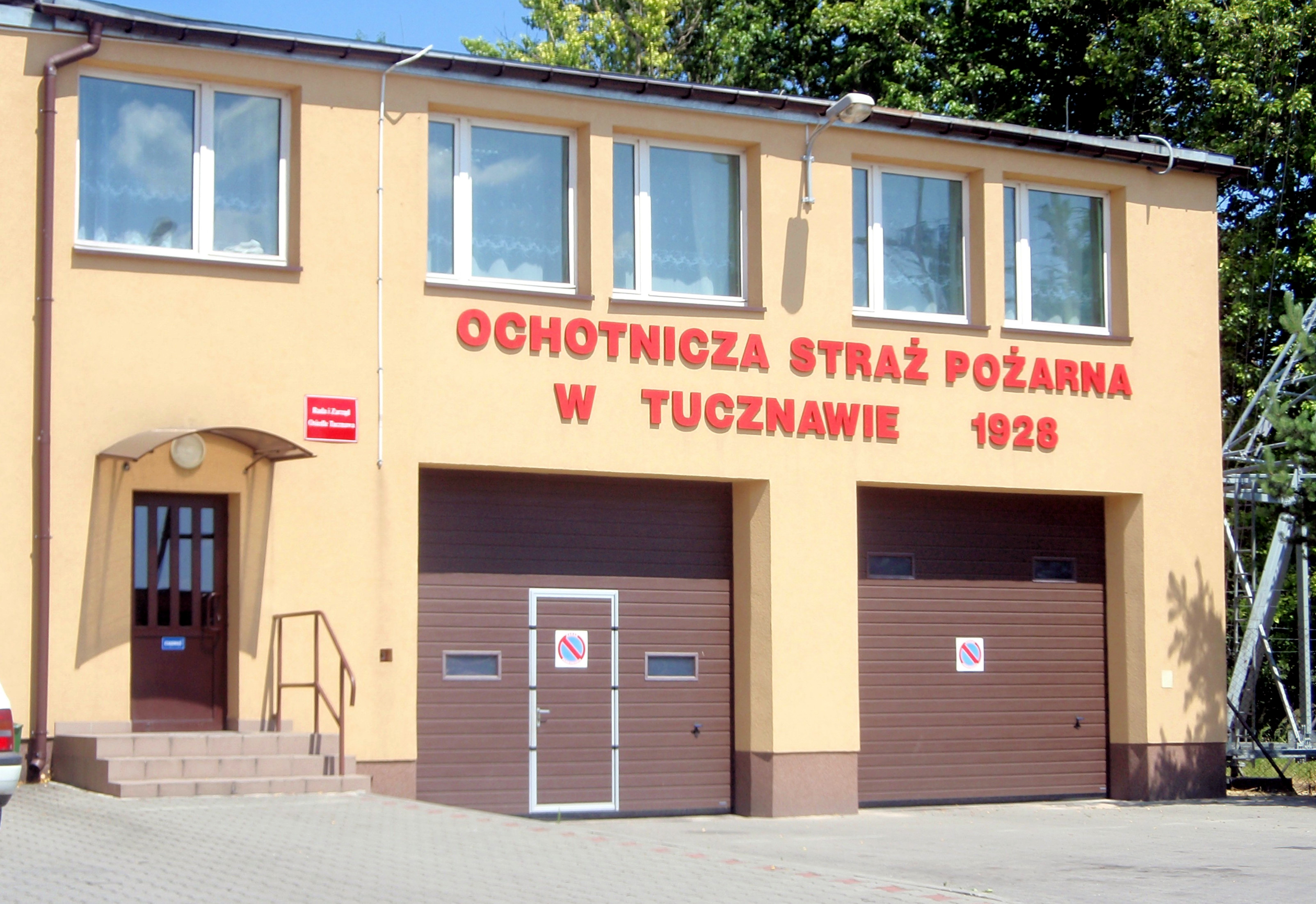
- Building of the fire station in Tucznawa (OSP Tucznawa)
- Interactive map of Tucznawa
- Country: Poland
- Voivodeship: Silesian
- County/City: Dąbrowa Górnicza
- Notable landmarks: chapel built in the 19th century

Area
  - Total: 6.14 km^{2} (2.37 sq mi)

Population (2004)
  - Total: 2,241
  - Density: 365/km^{2} (945/sq mi)
- Time zone: UTC+1 (CET)
  - Summer (DST): UTC+2 (CEST)
- Postal code: 42-522
- Area code: +48 32
- Vehicle registration: SD
- Primary airport: Katowice Airport
- Website: Tucznawa.info

Tucznawa (until 1960 called Tuczna Baba) is a district of the city of Dąbrowa Górnicza, in Silesian Voivodeship, in southern Poland. It was included within city limits in 1977. It is located 11.5 km (7.1 mi) south-east of the city centre and along the route Dąbrowa Górnicza – Zawiercie. Its neighbouring districts are: Sikorka and Bugaj. Tucznawa itself is divided into a few smaller parts: Smardz, Piaski, Rogatka, New Bugaj and Przymiarki (some sources recognize the last as a separate district). The majority of buildings in the district are single-family homes of country temper, with neighbouring gardens.

== History ==
The original name of the district (village) is Tuczno Baba (Tuczno Baba) or Tuczna Baba (which means fat woman). The first records about the village are from 1298. In the late 13th century, it was a part of the parish in Sławków. It had stayed in that parish until 1495, when it was moved to the newly arisen parish in Chruszczobród. Tucznawa was mentioned in Liber Beneficiorum Dioecesis Cracoviensis by Polish medieval chronicler, Jan Długosz. In the mid-15th century it was a property of bishops of Kraków and it was a part of clavis Slavcoviensis (bishop's estates of Sławków) until 1790. Within the Kingdom of Poland, it was administratively located in the Kraków Voivodeship in the Lesser Poland Province of the Polish Crown.

The railroad of Warsaw–Vienna railway (Kolej Warszawsko-Wiedeńska) runs through the district (the closest station is Dąbrowa Górnicza Sikorka).

Since 1912 Tucznawa had been a part of Łosień commune and after World War II it became a part of Ząbkowice common. In 1975 it had been attached to the town of Ząbkowice and later it was attached to Dąbrowa Górnicza on 1 February 1977.

The Volunteer fire department of Tucznawa was established in August 1928. On 9 September the first fire group consisting of 41 volunteer members was created. In 1953 the local fire department (OSP) received its first banner funded by inhabitants of the village (with the title Tuczna Baba). In 1978 to celebrate 50 years of activity, the OSP received a new banner.

In September 1939, during the German invasion of Poland, which started World War II, German troops committed a massacre of 14 Polish boy scouts from nearby Ogrodzieniec and Złoty Potok in the settlement (see Nazi crimes against the Polish nation). The town was afterwards occupied by Germany until 1945.

On 19 January 1985 Stanisław Nowak, the bishop of Częstochowa founded a parish of Tucznawa dedicated to the Transfiguration. The first parish priest was Stanisław Sikorski.

== Curiosities ==
There is a small chapel from the 19th century located in the centre of the district. Its construction is partially wooden and partially built of stone. In February 1863 a small detachment of insurgents had a camp near that chapel. Their task was to demount the railway track in order to break communication. The number of inhabitants helped them in the action.

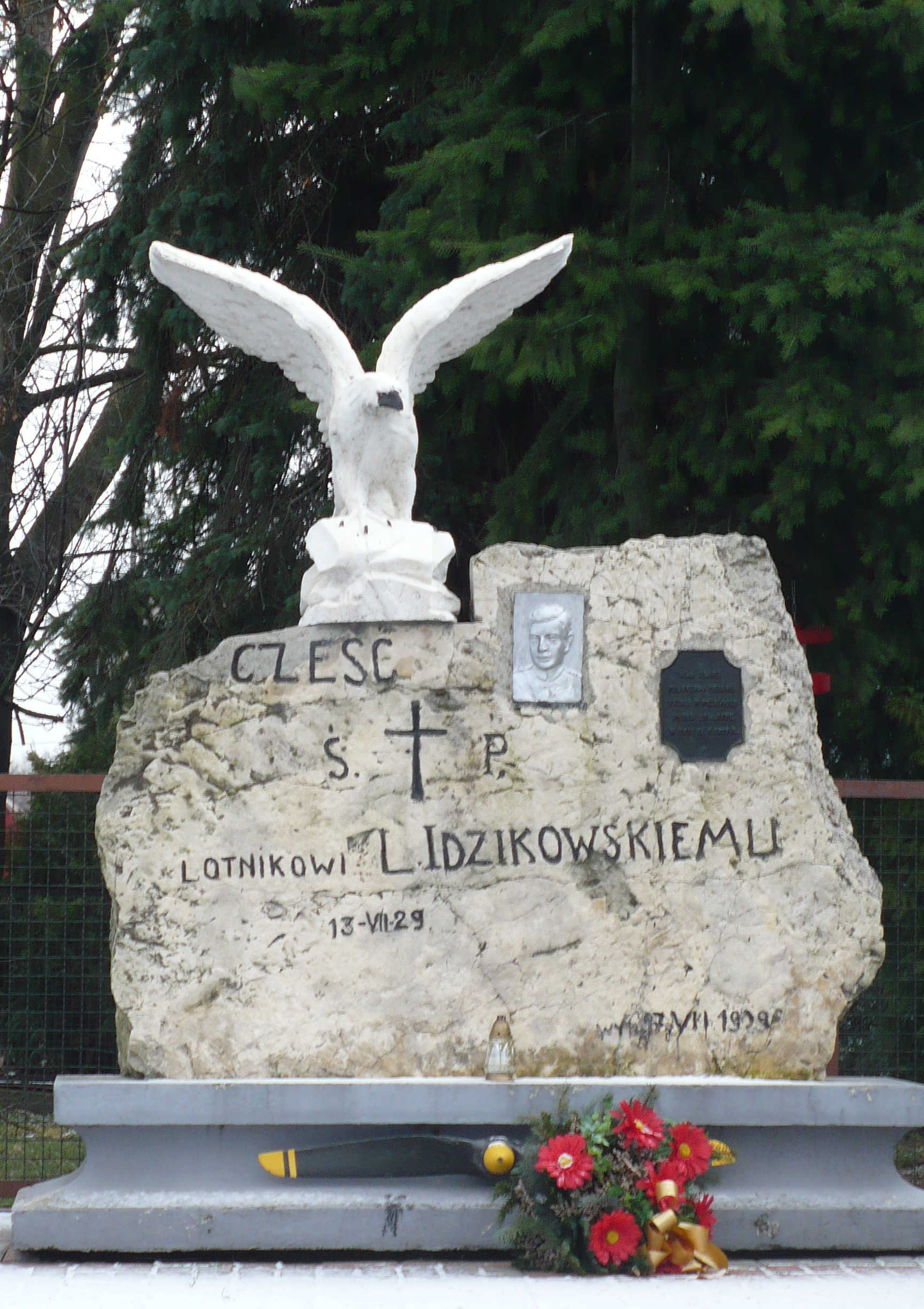
Monument commemorating Ludwik Idzikowski in Tucznawa. It was rebuilt in 2010 but the stone with plaque are parts of the original obelisk from 1929.

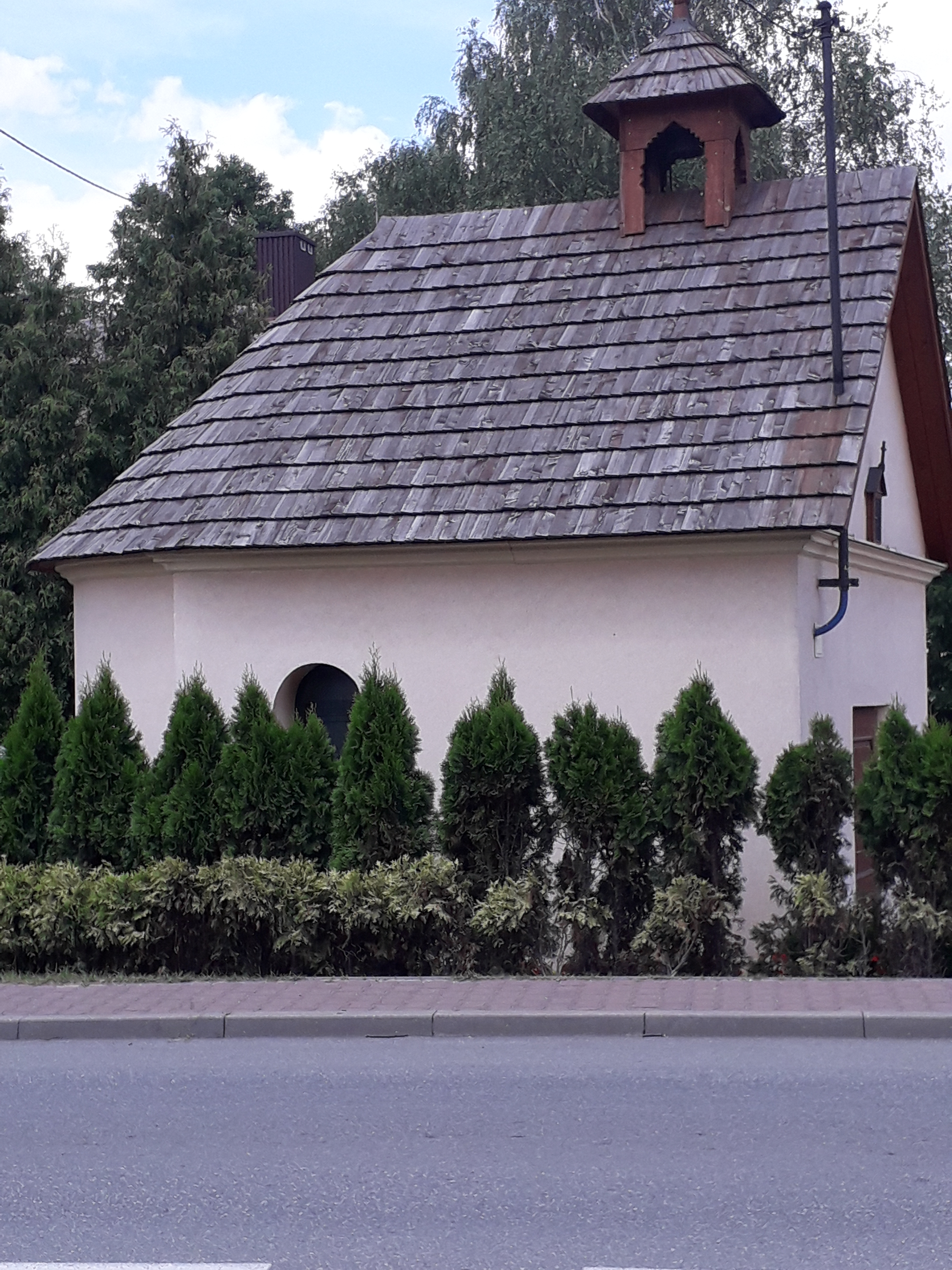
Chapel in Tucznawa

In the area of Primary School No 23 there are remains of monument commemorating aviator major Ludwik Idzikowski. The monument was uncovered on 17 July 1929. During the World War II it was destroyed by German Nazi soldiers. Only the stone and a board remained. In 2010 the monument was rebuilt.

Inscriptions on the plaque on the front side of the monument tell:

For the glory
of Poland's name
he died during his flight
over Atlantic
on 13 July 1929

The Trzebyczka river flows through Tucznawa. Water in this small stream appears only after a heavy rain and during melt in spring. However, the underground water streams cause undermining of the main street which is a significant problem of the district.

The theatrical and film actor Czesław Przybyła had been born and was buried in Tucznawa. Contemporary Królewska Street (Royal Street) was a section of old “bishop road” connecting Siewierz to Sławków and Kraków.

The relics of Saint Faustyna Kowalska are stored in the church of Tucznawa.

== Sport ==
Tucznawa has its own football club, named UKS Zagłębiak Tucznawa. Currently it plays in B-class (sub-area of Sosnowiec). The club plays its matches at the local stadium.

== See also ==
- Bataliony Chłopskie
- Dabrowski Battalion
