= Posłoda =

- Village
- Location within Poland
- Coordinates: 50°42′41″N 19°37′41″E
- Country: Poland
- Voivodeship: Silesian
- County: Częstochowa
- Gmina: Lelów

Posłoda [pɔˈswɔda] is a village in the administrative district of Gmina Lelów, within Częstochowa County, Silesian Voivodeship, in southern Poland.
