= Ludwik Idzikowski =

Polish aviator (1891–1929)

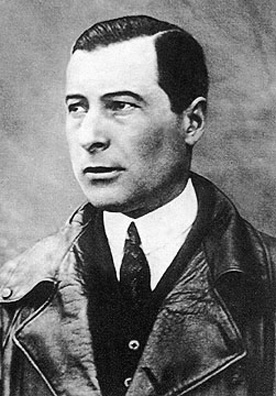
- Born: August 24, 1891; Warsaw
- Died: July 13, 1929 (aged 37); Graciosa

Ludwik Idzikowski (August 24, 1891 – July 13, 1929) was a Polish military aviator. He died during a transatlantic flight trial.

== Early life and service ==
Ludwik Idzikowski was born in Warsaw. He started mining studies in Liège, Belgium.

At the outbreak of World War I, he was conscripted into the Russian Army. He completed aviation school in Sevastopol, and from 1916 served in air combat units as an officer pilot. After the October Revolution he managed to return to Warsaw and in November 1918 Idzikowski joined the newly-born Polish Army, in the rank of podporucznik pilot (flying 2nd Lieutenant).

In 1919 he joined the Polish Air Force and during the Polish-Soviet War, initially flew with the 7th fighter escadre ("Kościuszko's Squadron"), crewed mostly by American volunteers, then the 6th reconnaissance escadre. He took part, among others, in the defence of Lwów. After the war, from 1921–1923 he was an instructor, then commander of escadre training in an advanced flying school in Grudziądz. From 1924–1926 he commanded an escadre, then a squadron, in the 1st Aviation Regiment in Warsaw.

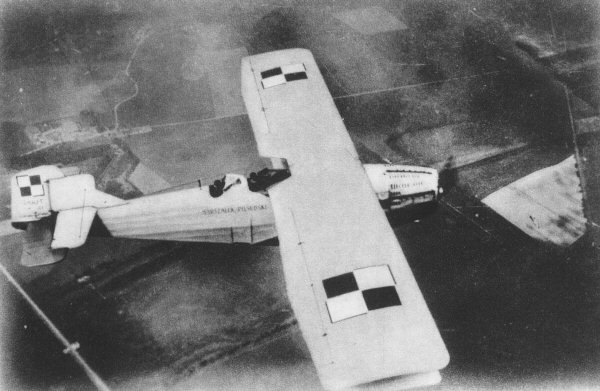
Idzikowski with Kazimierz Kubala in the Amiot 123 "Marszałek Piłsudski" airplane.

== First transatlantic flight attempt ==
In April 1926, Idzikowski was sent to France with a Polish military mission, where he tested aircraft bought by the Polish government. It was then that he planned to make his first transatlantic flight, but in the more difficult and as yet, unsuccessfully attempted East-West direction. A French attempt had been made in May 1927 aboard The White Bird (L'Oiseau Blanc), but the aircraft disappeared over the Atlantic. Two weeks later, the American Charles Lindbergh made the first successful nonstop flight from New York to Paris.

After considerable hesitation, the Polish authorities, urged on by the press, eventually succumbed and bought a special plane for a transatlantic flight from France. A long range variant of the latest bomber Amiot 123, It was named Marszałek Piłsudski (Marshal Józef Piłsudski). On January 1, 1928, Idzikowski was promoted to major.

The second pilot and navigator chosen was Major Kazimierz Kubala. They commenced their first trials for the transatlantic flight on August 3, 1928, taking off at 4:45 a.m. from Paris Le Bourget airfield. However, after flying some 3,200 km and above the ocean, they noticed engine oil levels were falling, caused by a cracked oil tank. They decided to return to Europe, since it was more than halfway to America and against the wind. After 31 hours of flight, oil depleted, Idzikowski decided to land on water by the German merchant ship Samos, about 70 km from the Spanish coast. The sailors rescued the crew and pulled the aircraft from the water.

== Second transatlantic flight attempt ==
Idzikowski and Kubala repeated a trial the next year. A second Amiot 123 was bought, since the old one was too badly damaged. It was named the White Eagle (according to some sources, it was named Marszałek Piłsudski as well). They took off on July 13, 1929, at 3:45 a.m. from Le Bourget. After flying 2140 km, over the ocean, about 5 p.m., an engine started to lose RPM and emit noise. They decided to land on Faial Island in the Azores. However, because of more irregular engine work, at 9 p.m. (7 p.m. local time), Idzikowski decided to make an emergency landing on a closer rocky island Graciosa. During a landing on a field, the plane hit a low stone wall and overturned, wheels up. In the crash, Ludwik Idzikowski was killed, while Kazimierz Kubala was saved by a farmer from a nearby village who pulled him from the wreckage. During the rescue operation, the aircraft was wrecked and Idzikowski burned.

Idzikowski's body was returned to Poland by the sailing ship ORP Iskra and buried with honours on August 17, 1929. He was awarded the Silver Cross of the Virtuti Militari, Cross of Valour (Krzyz Walecznych) (three times), Gold Cross of Merit, and (posthumously) the Officer's Cross of the Polonia Restituta. He also held the Field Pilot Badge.

Idzikowski was commemorated with a monument in Dąbrowa Górnicza-Tucznawa at the terrain of local Primary School.

== See also ==
- Orteig Prize
