= Lusławice, Silesian Voivodeship =

Lusławice
- Village
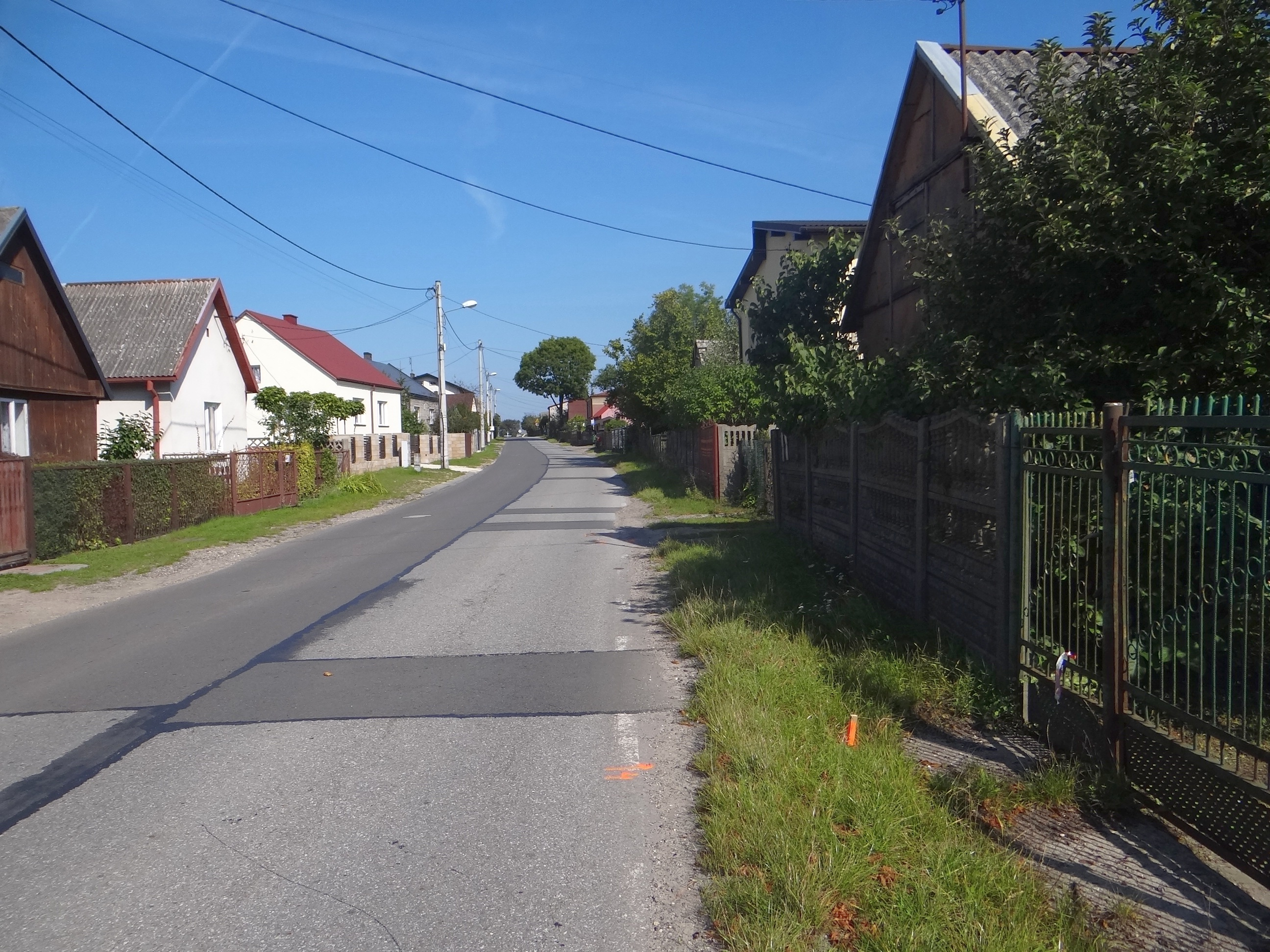

- Location within Poland
- Coordinates: 50°46′N 19°23′E
- Country: Poland
- Voivodeship: Silesian
- County: Częstochowa
- Gmina: Janów
- Population: 303

Lusławice [luswaˈvit͡sɛ] is a village in the administrative district of Gmina Janów, within Częstochowa County, Silesian Voivodeship, in southern Poland.
