= Zagórze, Częstochowa County =

Zagórze
- Village
- Location within Poland
- Coordinates: 50°46′N 19°22′E
- Country: Poland
- Voivodeship: Silesian
- County: Częstochowa
- Gmina: Janów
- Population: 221

Zagórze [zaˈɡuʐɛ] is a village in the administrative district of Gmina Janów, within Częstochowa County, Silesian Voivodeship, in southern Poland.
