= Siedlec Desert =

Desert in Poland

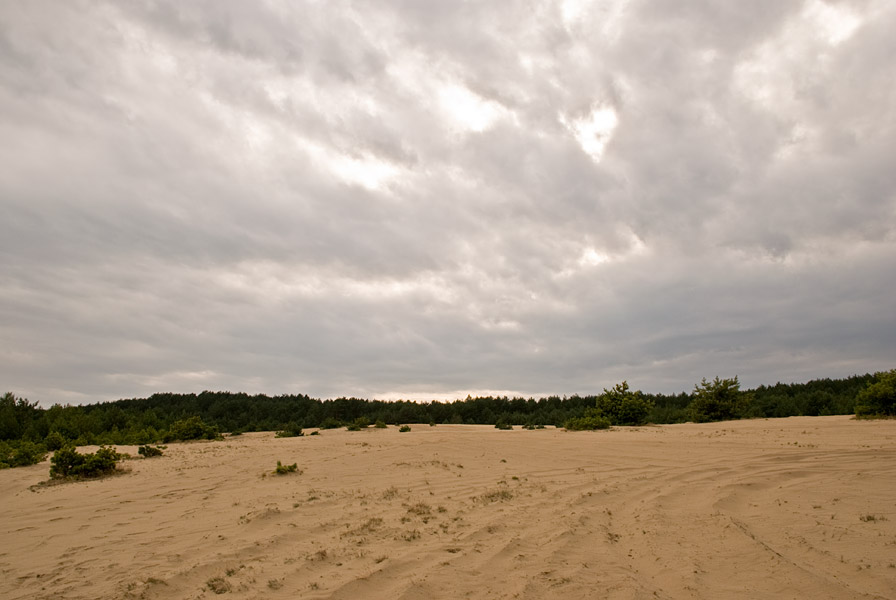

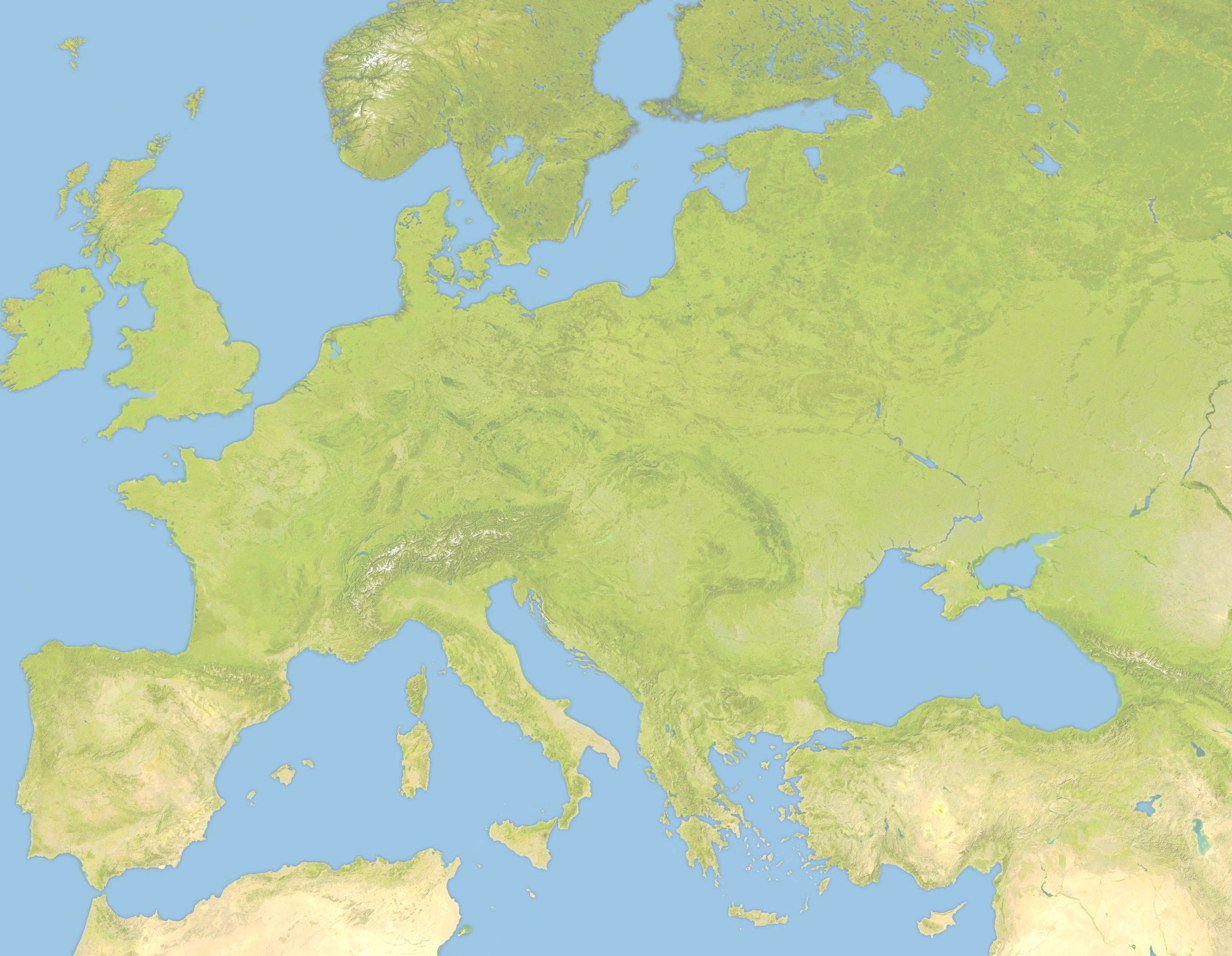
- Location within Poland Location within Europe without the extreme north
- Area: 0.3 km^{2} (0.12 mi^{2})

Naming
- Native name: Pustynia Siedlecka (Polish)

Geography
- Country: Poland
- Coordinates: 50°42′N 19°21′E
- Interactive map of Siedlec Desert

The Siedlec Desert (Polish: Pustynia Siedlecka) is an area of sand near the village of Siedlec, district of Gmina Janów, within Częstochowa County, Silesian Voivodeship, in the Kraków-Częstochowa Upland area of southern Poland. The "desert" was formed during sand-mining operations, with the sand itself coming from a buried Jurassic period seabed. The sand-mine finally closed in the 1960s. The desert covers approximately 30 hectares, of which 25 hectares is sand and the rest is made up by a pond and pine-trees planted in the area during the 1960s. The dunes at Siedlec reach up to 30 meters high and mirages are visible there in summer. Local legend has it that the desert was formed when a clever sorcerer pursued by the Devil escaped through the gates of hell, leaving the area around scorched.

The desert forms part of the Olsztyńsko-Gorzkowskie micro-region, and the dunes within it are the result of Aeolian processes.

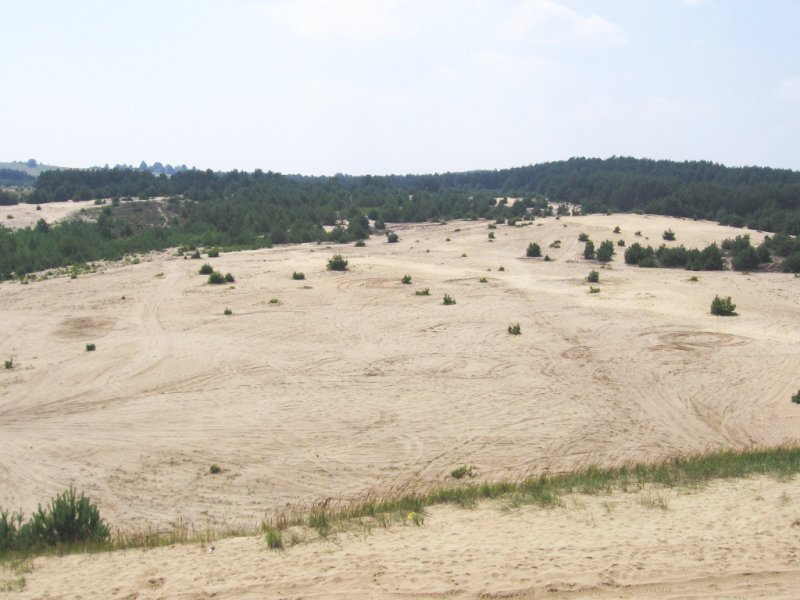
The Siedlec Desert in 2005 - the tracks from motor sports are visible in this picture

The area has been used in motor sports to allow racing in desert-style conditions. An annual festival held by local villagers involves dressing up as bedouins.
