= Gmina Janów, Silesian Voivodeship =

Gmina Janów Janów Commune
- Gmina
- Coat of arms
- Interactive map of Gmina Janów
- Coordinates (Janów): 50°43′26″N 19°26′10″E
- Country: Poland
- Voivodeship: Silesian
- County: Częstochowa
- Seat: Janów

Area
  - Total: 146.96 km^{2} (56.74 sq mi)

Population (2019-06-30)
  - Total: 5,959
  - Density: 40.55/km^{2} (105.0/sq mi)
- Website: https://www.janow.pl/

Gmina Janów is a rural gmina (administrative district) in Częstochowa County, Silesian Voivodeship, in southern Poland. Its seat is the village of Janów, which lies approximately 25 kilometres (16 mi) east of Częstochowa and 61 km (38 mi) north-east of the regional capital Katowice.

The gmina covers an area of 146.96 square kilometres (56.7 sq mi), and as of 2019 its total population is 5,959.

The gmina contains part of the protected area called Eagle Nests Landscape Park.

== Villages ==
Gmina Janów contains the villages and settlements of Apolonka, Bystrzanowice, Bystrzanowice-Dwór, Czepurka, Góry Gorzkowskie, Hucisko, Janów, Lgoczanka, Lipnik, Lusławice, Okrąglik, Pabianice, Piasek, Ponik, Siedlec, Skowronów, Śmiertny Dąb, Sokole Pole, Teodorów, Zagórze, Złoty Potok and Żuraw.

== Neighbouring gminas ==
Gmina Janów is bordered by the gminas of Lelów, Mstów, Niegowa, Olsztyn, Przyrów and Żarki.
