= Podlesie, Gmina Lelów =

Podlesie
- Village
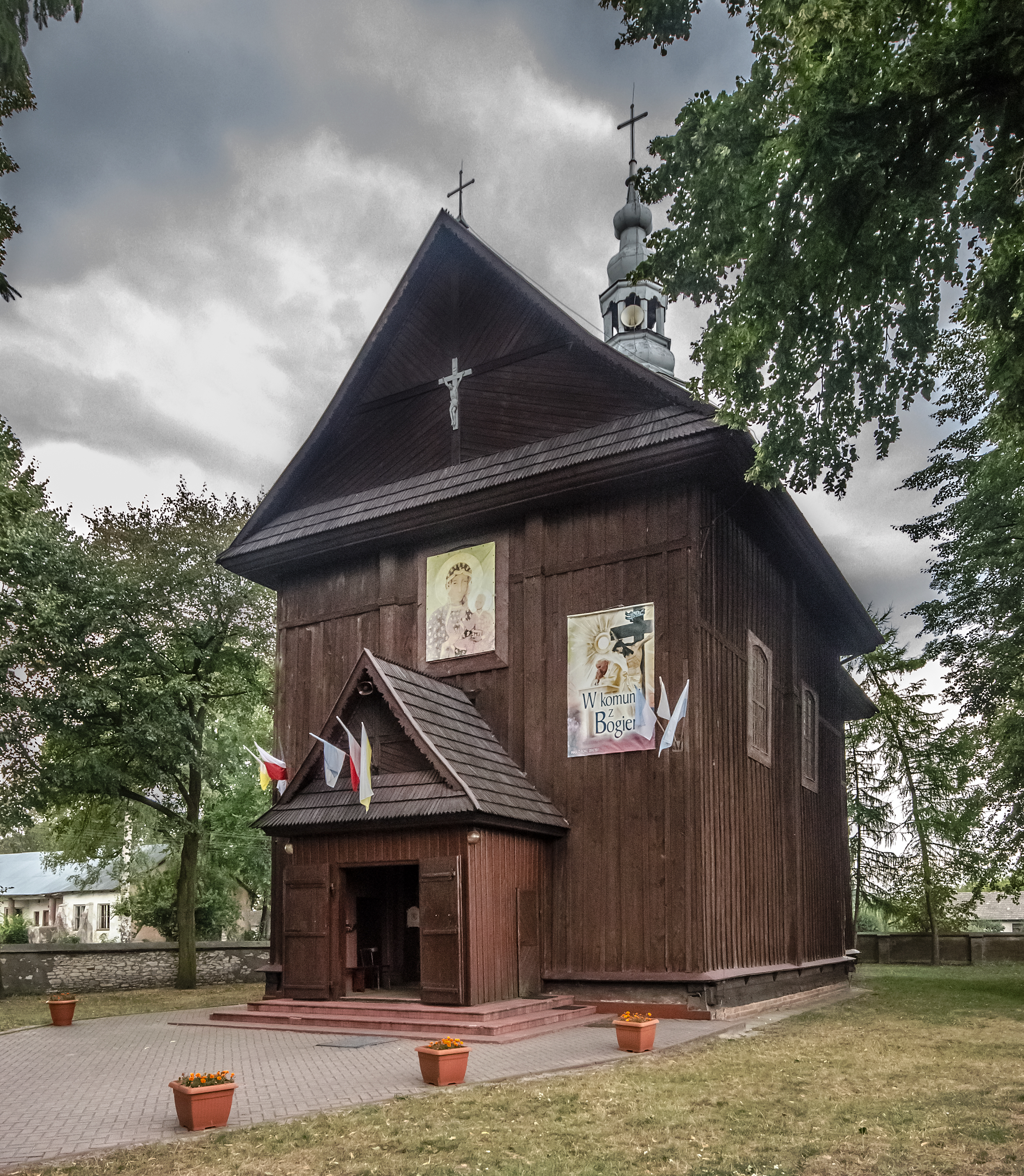
- Saint Giles church in Podlesie

- Location within Poland
- Coordinates: 50°45′N 19°36′E
- Country: Poland
- Voivodeship: Silesian
- County: Częstochowa
- Gmina: Lelów
- Population: 561
- Time zone: UTC+1 (CET)
  - Summer (DST): UTC+2 (CEST)
- Vehicle registration: SCZ

Podlesie [pɔdˈlɛɕɛ] is a village in the administrative district of Gmina Lelów, within Częstochowa County, Silesian Voivodeship, in southern Poland.

There is a train station in the village.
