= Staromieście =

- Village
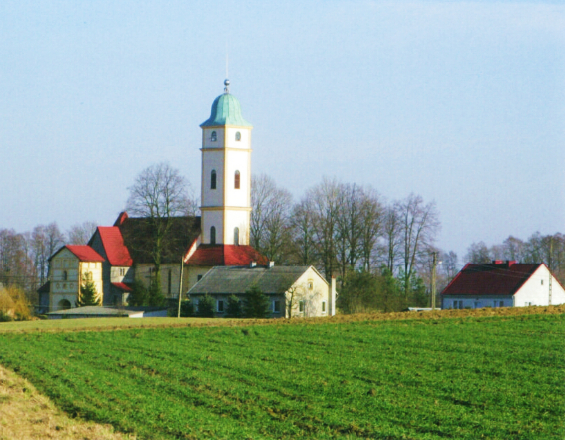

- Location within Poland
- Coordinates: 50°40′N 19°35′E
- Country: Poland
- Voivodeship: Silesian
- County: Częstochowa
- Gmina: Lelów
- Population: 276

Staromieście [starɔˈmjɛɕt͡ɕɛ] is a village in the administrative district of Gmina Lelów, within Częstochowa County, Silesian Voivodeship, in southern Poland.
