= Celiny, Częstochowa County =

Celiny
- Village
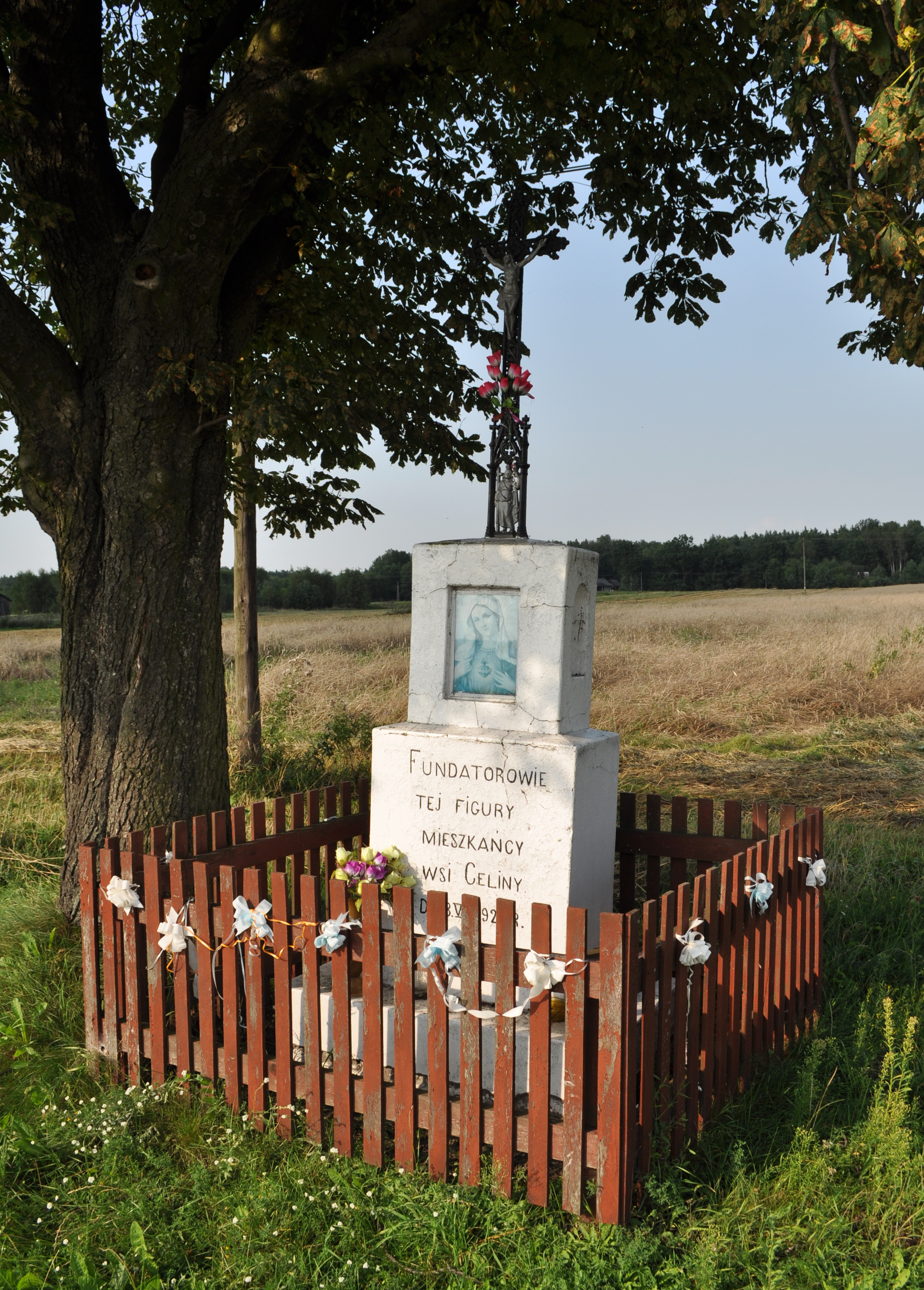
- Shrine from 1924 in Celiny

- Location within Poland
- Coordinates: 50°44′N 19°37′E
- Country: Poland
- Voivodeship: Silesian
- County: Częstochowa
- Gmina: Lelów
- Population: 73

Celiny [t͡sɛˈlinɨ] is a village in the administrative district of Gmina Lelów, within Częstochowa County, Silesian Voivodeship, in southern Poland.
