= Aleksandrów =

Aleksandrów may refer to the following places in Poland:

== Kuyavian-Pomeranian Voivodeship (north-central Poland) ==
- Aleksandrów County
- Aleksandrów Kujawski, town, the seat of Aleskandrów County

== Lublin Voivodeship (east Poland) ==
- Aleksandrów, Biłgoraj County
- Aleksandrów, Kraśnik County
- Aleksandrów, Gmina Łuków
- Aleksandrów, Gmina Stanin

== Łódź Voivodeship (central Poland) ==
- Aleksandrów Łódzki
- Aleksandrów, Bełchatów County
- Aleksandrów, Gmina Strzelce
- Aleksandrów, Gmina Żychlin
- Aleksandrów, Piotrków County
- Aleksandrów, Radomsko County
- Aleksandrów, Rawa County
- Aleksandrów, Tomaszów County

== Świętokrzyskie Voivodeship (south-central Poland) ==
- Aleksandrów, Jędrzejów County
- Aleksandrów, Pińczów County

== Masovian Voivodeship (east-central Poland) ==
- Aleksandrów, Garwolin County
- Aleksandrów, Gostynin County
- Aleksandrów, Grójec County
- Aleksandrów, Kozienice County
- Aleksandrów, Legionowo County
- Aleksandrów, Lipsko County
- Aleksandrów, Mińsk County
- Aleksandrów, Piaseczno County
- Aleksandrów, Gmina Iłów
- Aleksandrów, Gmina Rybno
- Aleksandrów, Szydłowiec County
- Aleksandrów, Żyrardów County
- Aleksandrów, Gmina Czosnów, Nowy Dwór County
- Aleksandrów, Radom County

== Greater Poland Voivodeship (west-central Poland) ==
- Aleksandrów, Kalisz County
- Aleksandrów, Koło County
- Aleksandrów, Gmina Nowe Miasto nad Wartą, Środa County
- Aleksandrów, Turek County

== Silesian Voivodeship (south Poland) ==
- Aleksandrów, Częstochowa County
- Aleksandrów (sołectwo Wąsosz)
- Aleksandrów, Kłobuck County

== Opole Voivodeship (south-west Poland) ==
- Aleksandrów, Opole Voivodeship

== See also ==
- Gmina Aleksandrów (disambiguation)
- Gmina Aleksandrów Kujawski
- Gmina Aleksandrów Łódzki
