= Jacek Jaworek =

Polish wanted fugitive (1969–2024)

- Born: Jacek Piotr Jaworek; 21 May 1969; Częstochowa, Polish People's Republic
- Died: c. July 19, 2024 (aged 55); Dąbrowa Zielona, Poland
- Known for: Murder fugitive

Jacek Piotr Jaworek (21 May 1969 – 19 July 2024) was a Polish construction worker who is suspected of killing his brother, sister in law and their 17-year-old son with a firearm on 10 July 2021 in the village of Borowce after an altercation between them had taken place. A multi-country manhunt was launched to find Jaworek, but it failed to return any results. Jaworek's body was found in 2024 and it was determined that he had killed himself.

== Biography ==
Jaworek worked as a construction worker in Germany, Switzerland, and Italy, but returned to Poland during the COVID-19 pandemic. He was jailed from March to June 2021 for not paying alimony. After he was released, Jaworek lived with his brother, who he was at constant odds with. Jaworek was described by people in the town where he lived as impetuous and aggressive towards his family. While drunk, Jaworek used to brag about having a weapon.

== Murders ==
On the night of 9–10 July 2021, the police received a call about a domestic dispute at a house in the village of Borowce. Upon arrival, officers discovered the bodies of Jaworek's brother Janusz (aged 44), Jaworek's brother's wife Justyna (aged 44), and Jaworek's brother's son Jakub (aged 17). The couple's younger son Gianni (aged 13) was awake talking to his friend on the internet at the time of the murders, and hid in the closet when he heard the sound of bullets and the screams of his family members. After he decided it was safe, he escaped through a window.

According to investigators, Jaworek shot his brother first, and then his sister-in-law and his nephew. He fired a total of 10 shots from a 7.65mm caliber Browning pistol. According to the prosecutor's office, Jaworek committed the murders because he and his brother had a dispute over their father's inheritance.

== Search ==
After the murders, a large-scale search for Jaworek began. An arrest warrant, European Arrest Warrant, and a red Interpol notice were issued for the capture of Jaworek. Over 100 witnesses were questioned, including the Jaworek family, and the village of Borowce and its surrounding were searched for Jaworek's body multiple times. In June 2022, the Katowice police published age progression pictures of Jaworek. The Katowice police suspected that Jaworek was either alive and hiding in Poland or abroad, or that he was dead and his corpse was in an unknown location. In June 2023, the investigation was suspended.

On 14 October 2023, a corpse was found about 20 kilometres (12 mi) from Borowce, where Jaworek committed his crimes. However, after DNA testing had been conducted, police refuted claims that it was Jaworek's body and concluded that it was a separate murder without any relation to his case.

On 19 July 2024, Jaworek's body was found. A few days later, he was identified through DNA comparison. The cause of his death was determined to be suicide. He was 55.

The investigation found that Jaworek hid in his aunt and godmother Teresa D's house in Dąbrowa Zielona and a search of her house by police found Jaworek's glasses and clothing. She was remanded to a pre-trial detention centre since the District Court in Częstochowa did not find that her age (she was 74) or health prevented her from being jailed. She was indicted on 31 July 2025 at the District Court in Myszków.

== In culture ==
The length of the search for Jacek Jaworek became the subject of jokes and internet memes, such as a trend to make posts on TikTok saying that Jaworek escaped to São Paulo.

== See also ==
- List of fugitives from justice who disappeared
- Stara Wieś shooting
