= Bolesławów =

Bolesławów may refer to the following places in Poland:

- Bolesławów, Lower Silesian Voivodeship (south-west Poland)
- Bolesławów, Łódź Voivodeship (central Poland)
- Bolesławów, Gostynin County in Masovian Voivodeship (east-central Poland)
- Bolesławów, Otwock County in Masovian Voivodeship (east-central Poland)
- Bolesławów, Greater Poland Voivodeship (west-central Poland)
- Bolesławów, Silesian Voivodeship (south Poland)
