= Schierokauer =

Schierokauer, Schirokauer
Origin
- Languages: German, Yiddish
- Meaning: from Schierokau (Polish: Sieraków, Silesian Voivodeship), Upper Silesia
- Region of origin: Poland, Silesia, Germany

Other names
- Variant form: Sierakowski

Schierokauer or Schirokauer is a surname. Notable people with the surname include:

- Alfred Schirokauer (1880–1934), German writer
- Auguste Pünkösdy, aka Auguste Schirokauer-Pünkösdy (1890–1967), Austrian actress
- Arno Schirokauer (1899–1954), German writer and Germanist
- Conrad Schirokauer, American historian
- Robert Schirokauer Hartman (1910–1973), German-American logician and philosopher
