= Andrzejów =

Andrzejów may refer to the following places:

- Andrzejów, Bełchatów County in Łódź Voivodeship (central Poland)
- Andrzejów, Chełm County in Lublin Voivodeship (east Poland)
- Andrzejów, Janów County in Lublin Voivodeship (east Poland)
- Andrzejów, Wieruszów County in Łódź Voivodeship (central Poland)
- Andrzejów, Zduńska Wola County in Łódź Voivodeship (central Poland)
- Andrzejów, Włodawa County in Lublin Voivodeship (east Poland)
- Andrzejów, Sochaczew County in Masovian Voivodeship (east-central Poland)
- Andrzejów, Zwoleń County in Masovian Voivodeship (east-central Poland)
