= Pawłów =

Pawłów may refer to the following places:

- Pawłów, Łódź Voivodeship (central Poland)
- Pawłów, Chełm County in Lublin Voivodeship (east Poland)
- Pawłów, Lublin County in Lublin Voivodeship (east Poland)
- Pawłów, Lesser Poland Voivodeship (south Poland)
- Pawłów, Busko County in Świętokrzyskie Voivodeship (south-central Poland)
- Pawłów, Sandomierz County in Świętokrzyskie Voivodeship (south-central Poland)
- Pawłów, Starachowice County in Świętokrzyskie Voivodeship (south-central Poland)
- Pawłów, Szydłowiec County in Masovian Voivodeship (east-central Poland)
- Pawłów, Wołomin County in Masovian Voivodeship (east-central Poland)
- Pawłów, Gmina Nowe Skalmierzyce in Greater Poland Voivodeship (west-central Poland)
- Pawłów, Gmina Sośnie in Greater Poland Voivodeship (west-central Poland)
- Pawłów, Silesian Voivodeship (south Poland)
- Pawłów, Opole Voivodeship (south-west Poland)
- Pavliv (Radekhiv Raion), in Lviv Oblast, Ukraine
