= Zagrodniki =

Zagrodniki may refer to:

- Zagrodniki, Łódź Voivodeship (central Poland)
- Zagrodniki, Lublin Voivodeship (east Poland)
- Zagrodniki, Masovian Voivodeship (east-central Poland)
