= Nowa Wola =

Nowa Wola may refer to the following places:

- Nowa Wola, Kuyavian-Pomeranian Voivodeship (north-central Poland)
- Nowa Wola, Lublin Voivodeship (east Poland)
- Nowa Wola, Podlaskie Voivodeship (north-east Poland)
- Nowa Wola, Gmina Rusiec in Łódź Voivodeship (central Poland)
- Nowa Wola, Gmina Zelów in Łódź Voivodeship (central Poland)
- Nowa Wola, Kozienice County in Masovian Voivodeship (east-central Poland)
- Nowa Wola, Piaseczno County in Masovian Voivodeship (east-central Poland)
- Nowa Wola, Radom County in Masovian Voivodeship (east-central Poland)
