= Święta Anna, Silesian Voivodeship =

Święta Anna
- Village
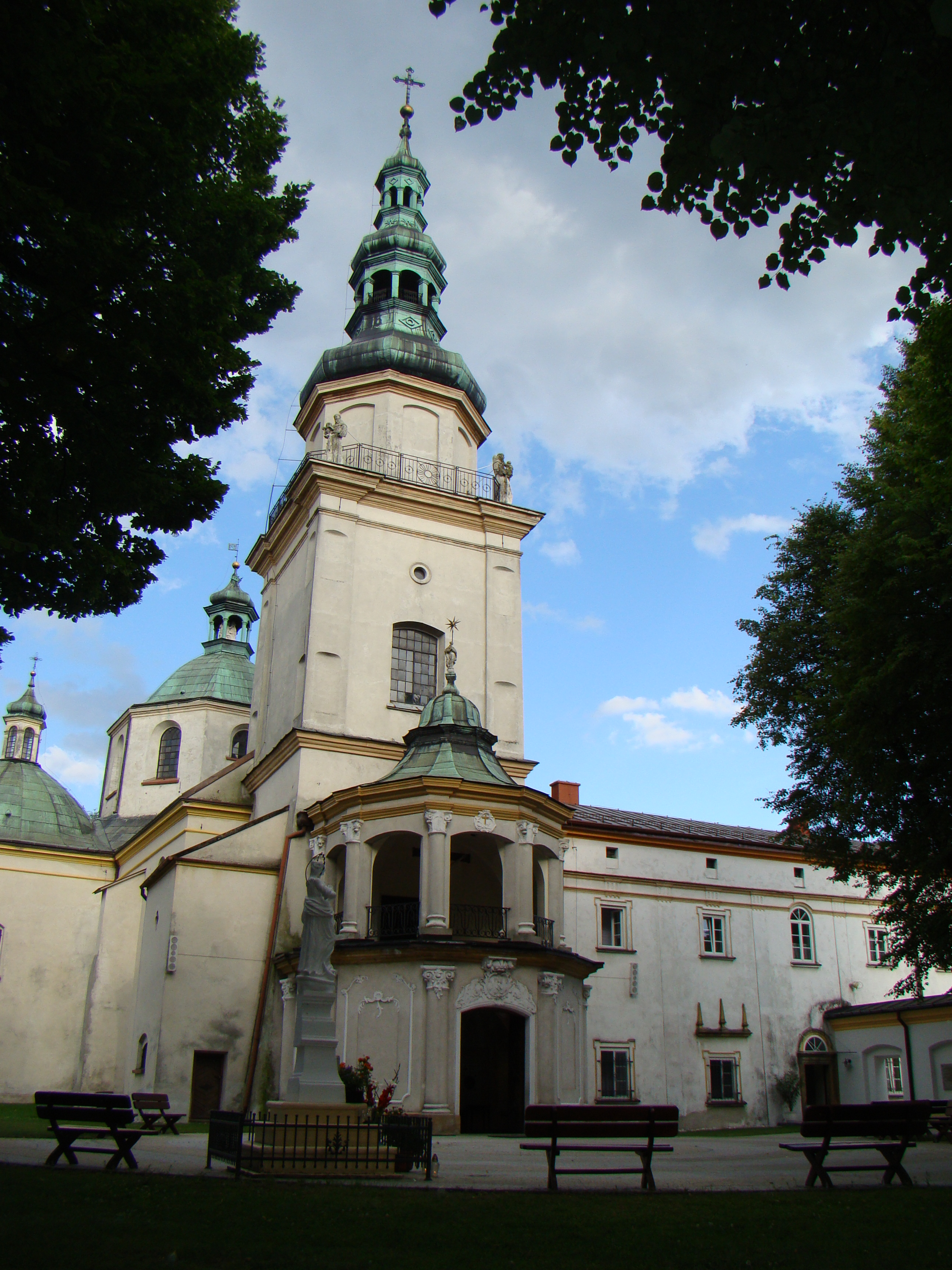
- Saint Anne Sanctuary in Święta Anna

- Location within Poland
- Coordinates: 50°49′N 19°31′E
- Country: Poland
- Voivodeship: Silesian
- County: Częstochowa
- Gmina: Dąbrowa Zielona

Population
  - Total: 175
- Time zone: UTC+1 (CET)
  - Summer (DST): UTC+2 (CEST)
- Vehicle registration: SCZ

Święta Anna (Polish pronunciation: [ˈɕfjɛnta ˈanna]) is a village in the administrative district of Gmina Dąbrowa Zielona, within Częstochowa County, Silesian Voivodeship, in southern Poland.

The landmark of Święta Anna is the Baroque Saint Anne Sanctuary.

== History ==
During the German invasion of Poland which started World War II, on September 3, 1939, German troops carried out a massacre of 29 Polish refugees at the local sanctuary (see Nazi crimes against the Polish nation).
