= Prądzew, Bełchatów County =

Prądzew
- Village
- Location within Poland
- Coordinates: 51°20′14″N 18°54′54″E
- Country: Poland
- Voivodeship: Łódź
- County: Bełchatów
- Gmina: Rusiec

Prądzew [ˈprɔnd͡zɛf] is a village in the administrative district of Gmina Rusiec, within Bełchatów County, Łódź Voivodeship, in central Poland.
