= Gmina Rusiec =

Gmina Rusiec Rusiec District
- Gmina
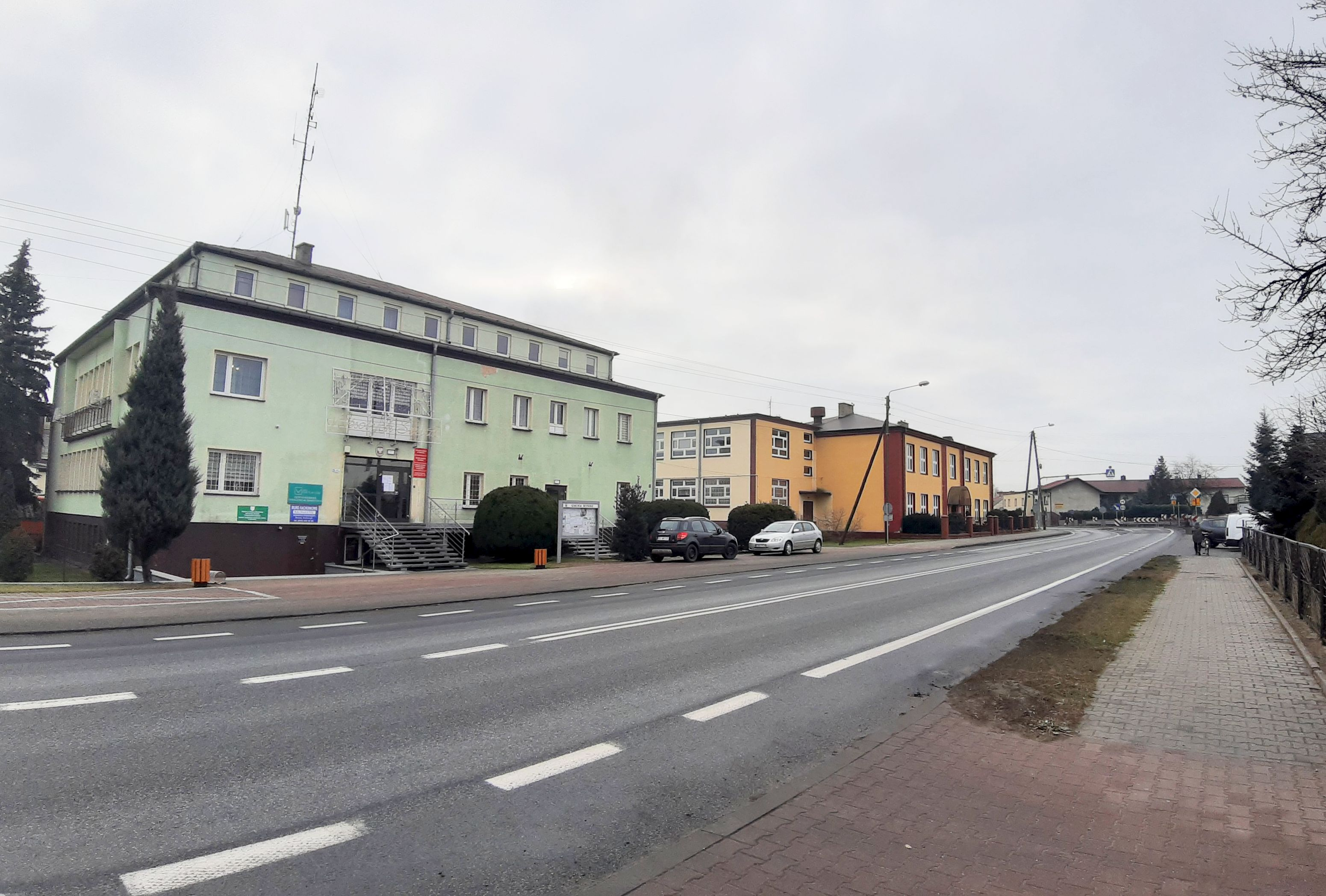

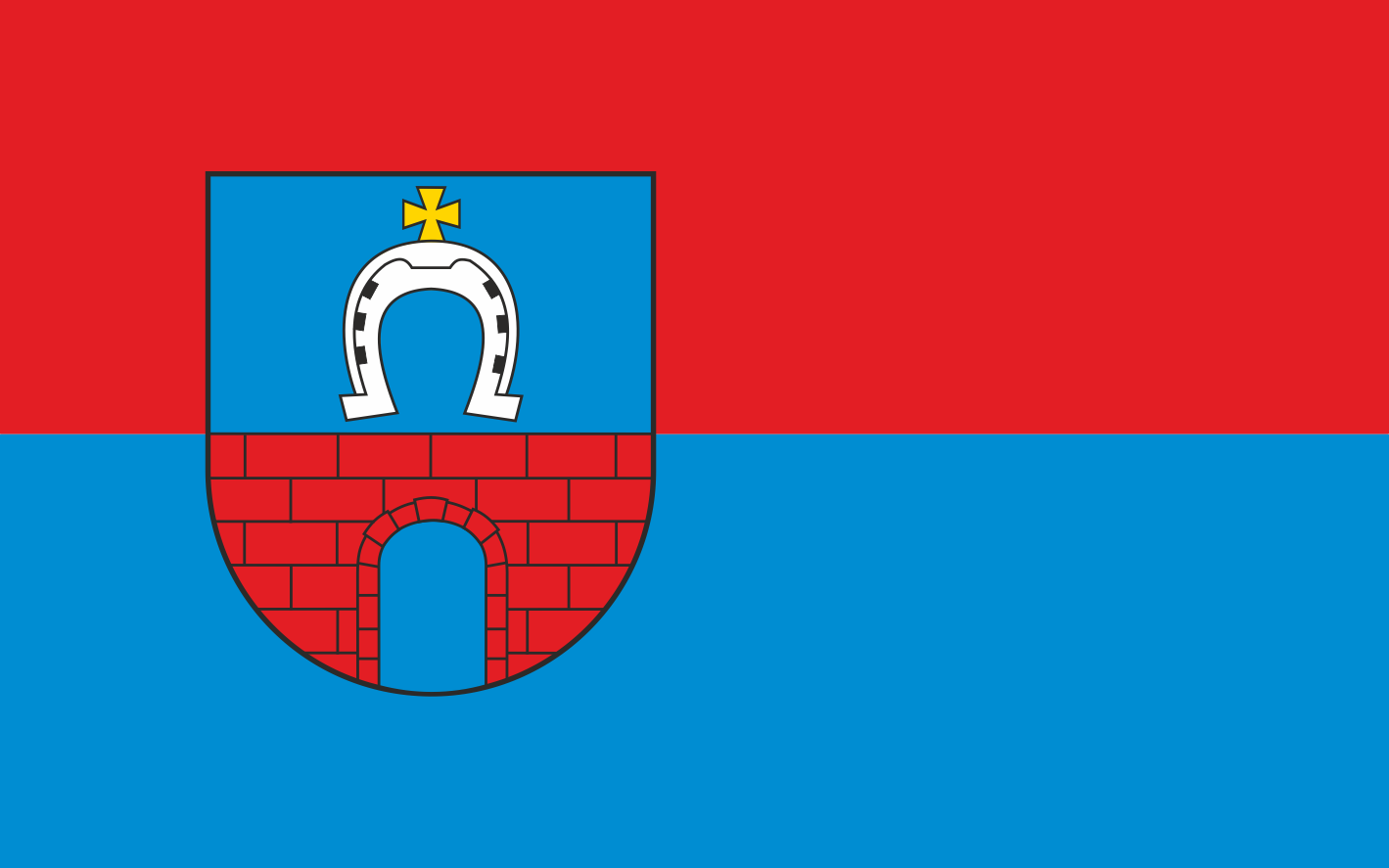
- Flag Coat of arms
- Interactive map of Gmina Rusiec
- Coordinates (Rusiec): 51°19′N 18°59′E
- Country: Poland
- Voivodeship: Łódź
- County: Bełchatów
- Seat: Rusiec

Area
  - Total: 99.73 km^{2} (38.51 sq mi)

Population (2023)
  - Total: 4,798
  - Density: 48/km^{2} (120/sq mi)
- Website: www.rusiec.pl

Gmina Rusiec is a rural gmina (administrative district) in Bełchatów County, Łódź Voivodeship, in central Poland. Its seat is the village of Rusiec, which lies approximately 28 kilometres (17 mi) west of Bełchatów and 62 km (39 mi) south-west of the regional capital Łódź.

The gmina covers an area of 99.73 square kilometres (38.5 sq mi), and as of 2023 its total population is 4,798.

== Villages ==
Gmina Rusiec contains the villages and settlements of:

- Aleksandrów
- Andrzejów
- Annolesie
- Antonina
- Bolesławów
- Dąbrowa
- Dąbrowa Rusiecka
- Dąbrówki Kobylańskie
- Dębina
- Dęby Wolskie
- Dęby Wolskie-Kolonia
- Fajnów
- Jastrzębice
- Koch
- Korablew
- Kurówek Prądzewski
- Kuźnica
- Leśniaki
- Mierzynów
- Nowa Wola
- Pawłów
- Prądzew
- Rusiec
- Wincentów
- Wola Wiązowa
- Zagrodniki
- Zakurowie
- Zalasy

== Neighbouring gminas ==
Gmina Rusiec is bordered by the gminas of Kiełczygłów, Konopnica, Osjaków, Rząśnia, Szczerców and Widawa.
