= Wola Mokrzeska =

- Village
- Location within Poland
- Coordinates: 50°49′N 19°27′E
- Country: Poland
- Voivodeship: Silesian
- County: Częstochowa
- Gmina: Przyrów
- Population: 333

Wola Mokrzeska [ˈvɔla mɔˈkʂɛska] is a village in the administrative district of Gmina Przyrów, within Częstochowa County, Silesian Voivodeship, in southern Poland.
