= Aleksandrów (sołectwo Wąsosz) =

- Village
- Location within Poland
- Coordinates: 50°43′N 19°41′E
- Country: Poland
- Voivodeship: Silesian
- County: Częstochowa
- Gmina: Koniecpol
- Population: 120

Aleksandrów [alɛkˈsandruf] is a village in the sołectwo of Wąsosz, in the administrative district of Gmina Koniecpol, within Częstochowa County, Silesian Voivodeship, in southern Poland.

There is also another Aleksandrów in the gmina, having sołectwo status.
