= Kurówek Prądzewski =

- Village
- Location within Poland
- Coordinates: 51°21′12″N 18°55′23″E
- Country: Poland
- Voivodeship: Łódź
- County: Bełchatów
- Gmina: Rusiec

Kurówek Prądzewski [kuˈruvɛk prɔnˈd͡zɛfski] is a village in the administrative district of Gmina Rusiec, within Bełchatów County, Łódź Voivodeship, in central Poland.
