= Stary Koniecpol =

- Village
- Location within Poland
- Coordinates: 50°47′N 19°38′E
- Country: Poland
- Voivodeship: Silesian
- County: Częstochowa
- Gmina: Koniecpol
- Population: 684

Stary Koniecpol [ˈstarɨ kɔˈɲɛt͡spɔl] is a village in the administrative district of Gmina Koniecpol, within Częstochowa County, Silesian Voivodeship, in southern Poland.
