= Kuźnica Wąsowska =

- Village
- Location within Poland
- Coordinates: 50°44′N 19°41′E
- Country: Poland
- Voivodeship: Silesian
- County: Częstochowa
- Gmina: Koniecpol
- Population: 84

Kuźnica Wąsowska (Polish pronunciation: [kuʑˈɲit͡sa vɔ̃ˈsɔfska]) is a village in the administrative district of Gmina Koniecpol, within Częstochowa County, Silesian Voivodeship, in southern Poland.
