= Rusiec, Łódź Voivodeship =

Rusiec
- Village
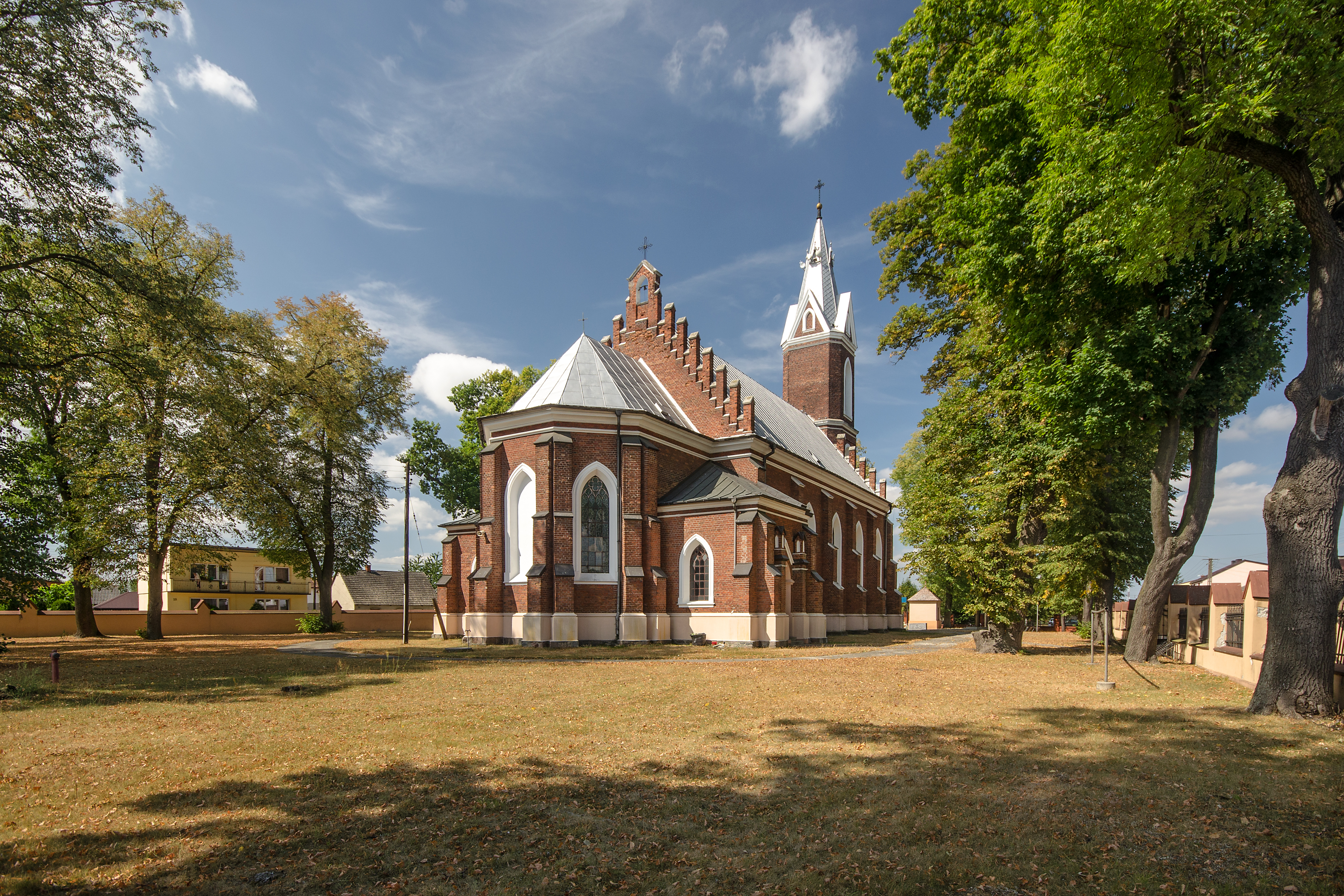
- Church of the Visitation of the Holy Virgin Mary

- Location within Poland
- Coordinates: 51°19′N 18°59′E
- Country: Poland
- Voivodeship: Łódź
- County: Bełchatów
- Gmina: Rusiec

Population
  - Total: 1,500

Rusiec [ˈruɕɛt͡s] is a village in Bełchatów County, Łódź Voivodeship, in central Poland. It is the seat of the gmina (administrative district) called Gmina Rusiec.

== Transport ==
Rusiec lies along national road 42.

It has a station on the Polish Coal Trunk Line.
