= Aleksandrów, Częstochowa County =

Aleksandrów
- Village
- Location within Poland
- Coordinates: 50°46′N 19°45′E
- Country: Poland
- Voivodeship: Silesian
- County: Częstochowa
- Gmina: Koniecpol
- Population: 165

Aleksandrów [alɛkˈsandruf] is a village in the administrative district of Gmina Koniecpol, within Częstochowa County, Silesian Voivodeship, in southern Poland.

There is also another Aleksandrów in the gmina, in the sołectwo of Wąsosz.
