= Sygontka =

- Village
- Location within Poland
- Coordinates: 50°45′N 19°29′E
- Country: Poland
- Voivodeship: Silesian
- County: Częstochowa
- Gmina: Przyrów
- Population: 318

Sygontka [sɨˈɡɔntka] is a village in the administrative district of Gmina Przyrów, within Częstochowa County, Silesian Voivodeship, in southern Poland.
