= Kuźnica Grodziska =

- Village
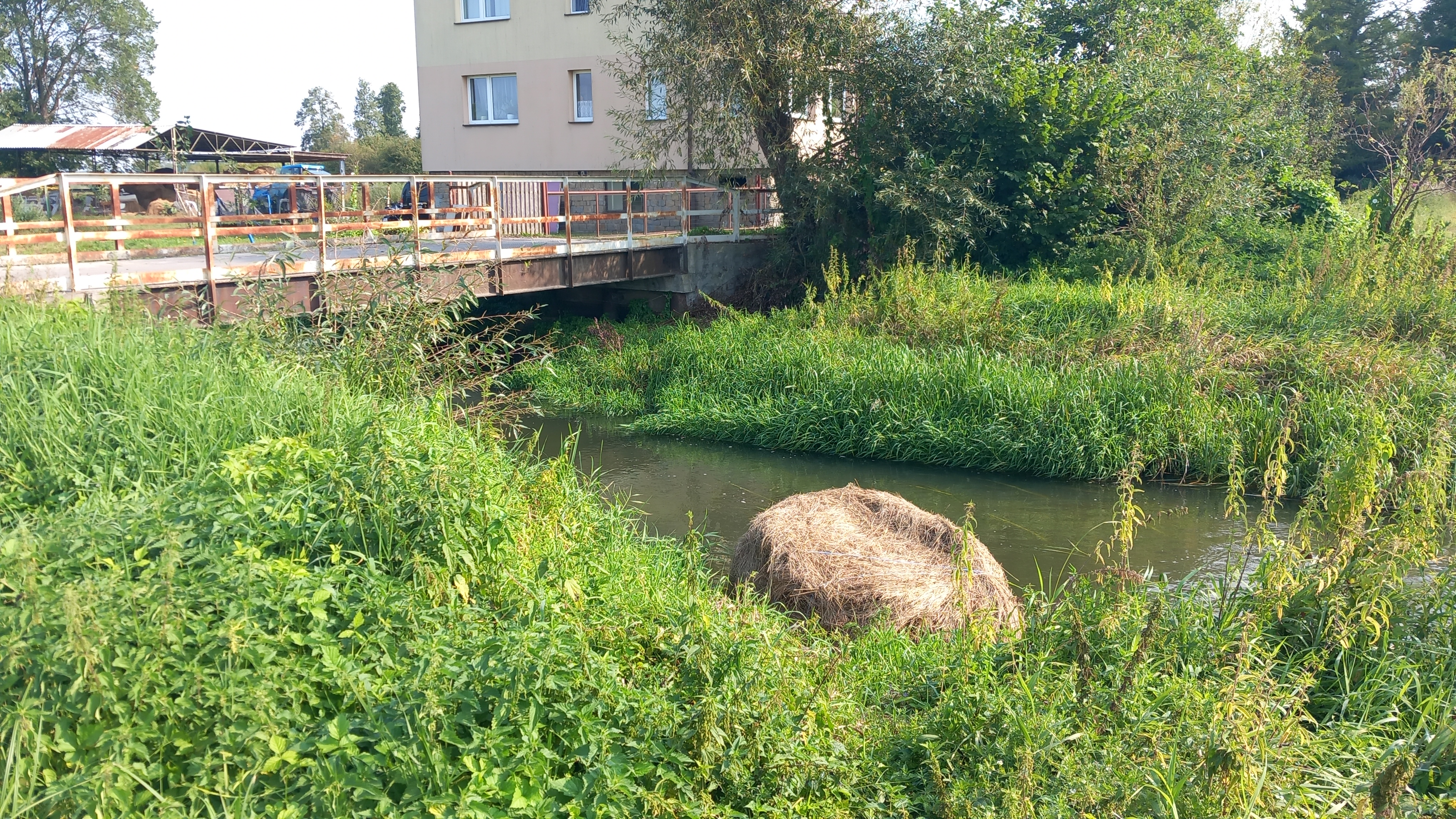

- Location within Poland
- Coordinates: 50°50′N 19°44′E
- Country: Poland
- Voivodeship: Silesian
- County: Częstochowa
- Gmina: Koniecpol
- Population: 268

Kuźnica Grodziska (Polish pronunciation: [kuʑˈɲit͡sa ɡrɔˈd͡ʑiska]) is a village in the administrative district of Gmina Koniecpol, within Częstochowa County, Silesian Voivodeship, in southern Poland.
