= Dąbrowa, Częstochowa County =

Dąbrowa
- Village
- Location within Poland
- Coordinates: 50°49′N 19°46′E
- Country: Poland
- Voivodeship: Silesian
- County: Częstochowa
- Gmina: Koniecpol
- Population: 75

Dąbrowa [dɔmˈbrɔva] is a village in the administrative district of Gmina Koniecpol, within Częstochowa County, Silesian Voivodeship, in southern Poland.
