= Stanisławów, Częstochowa County =

Stanisławów
- Village
- Location within Poland
- Coordinates: 50°47′N 19°32′E
- Country: Poland
- Voivodeship: Silesian
- County: Częstochowa
- Gmina: Przyrów
- Population: 93

Stanisławów [staniˈswavuf] is a village in the administrative district of Gmina Przyrów, in Częstochowa County, Silesian Voivodeship, in southern Poland.
