= Dęby Wolskie =

- Village
- Location within Poland
- Coordinates: 51°19′N 18°56′E
- Country: Poland
- Voivodeship: Łódź
- County: Bełchatów
- Gmina: Rusiec

Dęby Wolskie [ˈdɛmbɨ ˈvɔlskʲɛ] is a village in the administrative district of Gmina Rusiec, within Bełchatów County, Łódź Voivodeship, in central Poland.
