= Pod Jantym =

- Village
- Location within Poland
- Coordinates: 50°50′25″N 19°39′33″E
- Country: Poland
- Voivodeship: Silesian
- County: Częstochowa
- Gmina: Koniecpol

Pod Jantym [ˈpɔt ˈjantɨm] is a village in the administrative district of Gmina Koniecpol, within Częstochowa County, Silesian Voivodeship, in southern Poland.
