= Aleksandrówka, Silesian Voivodeship =

Village in Silesian Voivodeship, Poland

Aleksandrówka
- Village
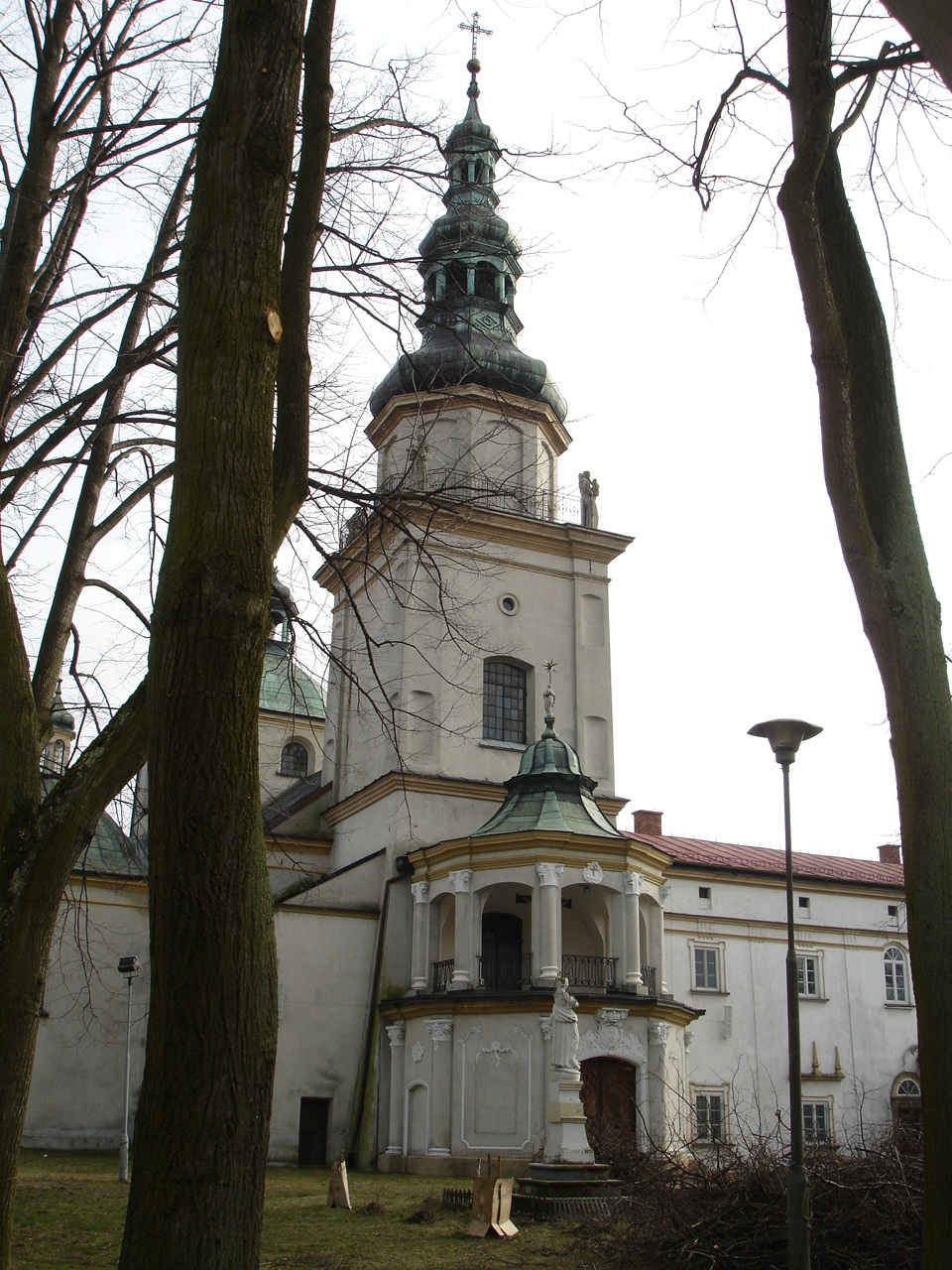

- Location within Poland
- Coordinates: 50°49′N 19°31′E
- Country: Poland
- Voivodeship: Silesian
- County: Częstochowa
- Gmina: Przyrów
- Population: 107

Aleksandrówka [alɛksanˈdrufka] is a village in the administrative district of Gmina Przyrów, within Częstochowa County, Silesian Voivodeship, in southern Poland.
