= Jastrzębice =

- Village
- Location within Poland
- Coordinates: 51°17′59″N 19°0′1″E
- Country: Poland
- Voivodeship: Łódź
- County: Bełchatów
- Gmina: Rusiec

Jastrzębice [jastʂɛmˈbit͡sɛ] is a village in the administrative district of Gmina Rusiec, within Bełchatów County, Łódź Voivodeship, in central Poland.
