= Gmina Koniecpol =

Gmina Koniecpol Koniecpol Commune
- Gmina
- Flag Coat of arms
- Interactive map of Gmina Koniecpol
- Coordinates (Koniecpol): 50°47′N 19°41′E
- Country: Poland
- Voivodeship: Silesian
- County: Częstochowa
- Seat: Koniecpol

Area
  - Total: 146.75 km^{2} (56.66 sq mi)

Population (2019-06-30)
  - Total: 9,441
  - Density: 64.33/km^{2} (166.6/sq mi)
  - Urban: 5,910
  - Rural: 3,531
- Website: https://www.koniecpol.pl/

Gmina Koniecpol is an urban-rural gmina (administrative district) in Częstochowa County, Silesian Voivodeship, in southern Poland. Its seat is the town of Koniecpol, which lies approximately 40 kilometres (25 mi) east of Częstochowa and 77 km (48 mi) north-east of the regional capital Katowice.

The gmina covers an area of 146.75 square kilometres (56.7 sq mi), and as of 2019 its total population is 9,441.

== Villages ==
Apart from the town of Koniecpol, Gmina Koniecpol contains the villages and settlements of Aleksandrów (village with sołectwo status), Aleksandrów (sołectwo Wąsosz), Borek, Dąbrowa, Kozaków, Kuźnica Grodziska, Kuźnica Wąsowska, Łabędź, Luborcza, Ludwinów, Łysaków, Łysiny, Michałów, Oblasy, Okołowice, Pękowiec, Piaski, Pod Jantym, Radoszewnica, Rudniki, Rudniki-Kolonia, Siernicze-Gajówka, Stanisławice, Stary Koniecpol, Stefanów, Teodorów, Teresów, Wąsosz, Wólka, Zagacie, Załęże and Zaróg.

== Neighbouring gminas ==
Gmina Koniecpol is bordered by the gminas of Dąbrowa Zielona, Lelów, Przyrów, Secemin, Szczekociny, Włoszczowa and Żytno.

== Twin towns – sister cities ==
Gmina Koniecpol is twinned with:

- Sniatyn, Ukraine
