= Antonina, Bełchatów County =

Antonina
- Village
- Location within Poland
- Coordinates: 51°18′N 18°57′E
- Country: Poland
- Voivodeship: Łódź
- County: Bełchatów
- Gmina: Rusiec
- Population: 150

Antonina [antɔˈnina] is a village in the administrative district of Gmina Rusiec, within Bełchatów County, Łódź Voivodeship, in central Poland.
