= Staropole, Silesian Voivodeship =

Staropole
- Village
- Location within Poland
- Coordinates: 50°46′N 19°31′E
- Country: Poland
- Voivodeship: Silesian
- County: Częstochowa
- Gmina: Przyrów
- Population: 245

Staropole [starɔˈpɔlɛ] is a village in the administrative district of Gmina Przyrów, within Częstochowa County, Silesian Voivodeship, in southern Poland.
