= Koch, Łódź Voivodeship =

Koch
- Village
- Location within Poland
- Coordinates: 51°18′N 19°2′E
- Country: Poland
- Voivodeship: Łódź
- County: Bełchatów
- Gmina: Rusiec

Koch [kɔx] is a village in the administrative district of Gmina Rusiec, within Bełchatów County, Łódź Voivodeship, in central Poland.
