= Dębina, Gmina Rusiec =

Dębina
- Village
- Location within Poland
- Coordinates: 51°21′8″N 18°58′39″E
- Country: Poland
- Voivodeship: Łódź
- County: Bełchatów
- Gmina: Rusiec

Dębina [dɛmˈbina] is a village in the administrative district of Gmina Rusiec, within Bełchatów County, Łódź Voivodeship, in central Poland.
