= Nowa Wieś, Gmina Dąbrowa Zielona =

Nowa Wieś
- Village
- Location within Poland
- Coordinates: 50°51′42″N 19°31′39″E
- Country: Poland
- Voivodeship: Silesian
- County: Częstochowa
- Gmina: Dąbrowa Zielona
- Population: 131

Nowa Wieś [ˈnɔva ˈvjɛɕ] is a village in the administrative district of Gmina Dąbrowa Zielona, within Częstochowa County, Silesian Voivodeship, in southern Poland.
