= Dąbek, Silesian Voivodeship =

Dąbek
- Village
- Location within Poland
- Coordinates: 50°50′N 19°27′E
- Country: Poland
- Voivodeship: Silesian
- County: Częstochowa
- Gmina: Dąbrowa Zielona
- Population: 151

Dąbek [ˈdɔmbɛk] is a village in the administrative district of Gmina Dąbrowa Zielona, within Częstochowa County, Silesian Voivodeship, in southern Poland.
