= Kopaniny, Częstochowa County =

Kopaniny
- Village
- Location within Poland
- Coordinates: 50°48′N 19°29′E
- Country: Poland
- Voivodeship: Silesian
- County: Częstochowa
- Gmina: Przyrów
- Population: 38

Kopaniny [kɔpaˈninɨ] is a village in the administrative district of Gmina Przyrów, within Częstochowa County, Silesian Voivodeship, in southern Poland.
