= Siernicze-Gajówka =

- Village
- Location within Poland
- Coordinates: 50°43′00″N 19°44′14″E
- Country: Poland
- Voivodeship: Silesian
- County: Częstochowa
- Gmina: Koniecpol

Siernicze-Gajówka [ɕɛrˈnit͡ʂɛ ɡaˈjufka] is a village in the administrative district of Gmina Koniecpol, within Częstochowa County, Silesian Voivodeship, in southern Poland.

Between the years of 1975 and 1998 the town administratively belonged to the Częstochowa Voivodeship.
