= Olbrachcice, Silesian Voivodeship =

Olbrachcice
- Village
- Location within Poland
- Coordinates: 50°49′N 19°33′E
- Country: Poland
- Voivodeship: Silesian
- County: Częstochowa
- Gmina: Dąbrowa Zielona
- Population: 457

Olbrachcice [ɔlbraxˈt͡ɕit͡sɛ] is a village in the administrative district of Gmina Dąbrowa Zielona, within Częstochowa County, Silesian Voivodeship, in southern Poland.
