= Zakurowie =

- Village
- Location within Poland
- Coordinates: 51°21′N 18°54′E
- Country: Poland
- Voivodeship: Łódź
- County: Bełchatów
- Gmina: Rusiec

Zakurowie [zakuˈrɔvjɛ] is a village in the administrative district of Gmina Rusiec, within Bełchatów County, Łódź Voivodeship, in central Poland.
