= Radoszewnica =

- Village
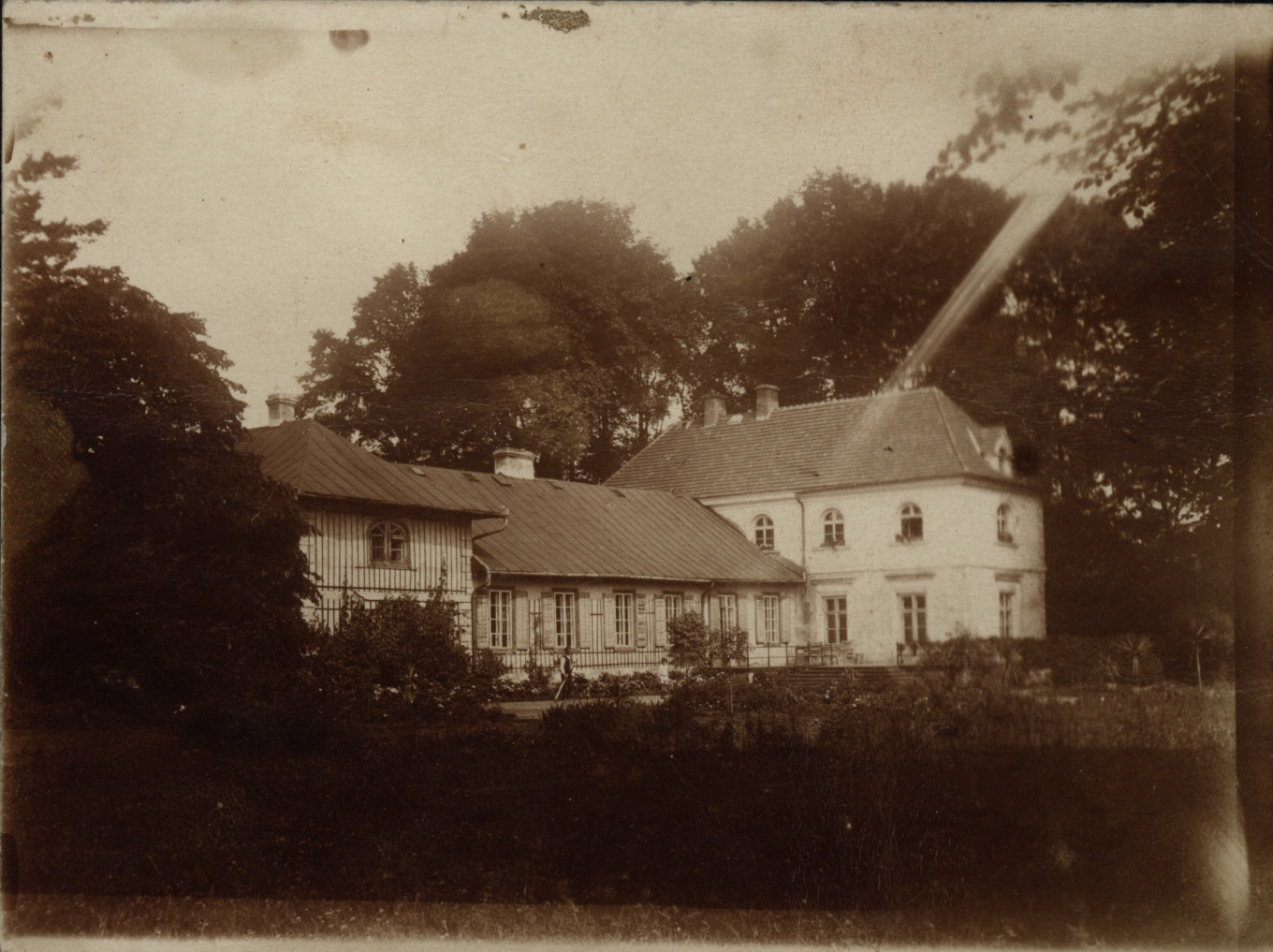
- Manor house

- Location within Poland
- Coordinates: 50°48′N 19°40′E
- Country: Poland
- Voivodeship: Silesian
- County: Częstochowa
- Gmina: Koniecpol
- Population: 467

Radoszewnica [radɔʂɛvˈnit͡sa] is a village in the administrative district of Gmina Koniecpol, within Częstochowa County, Silesian Voivodeship, in southern Poland.
