= Wiercica =

- Village
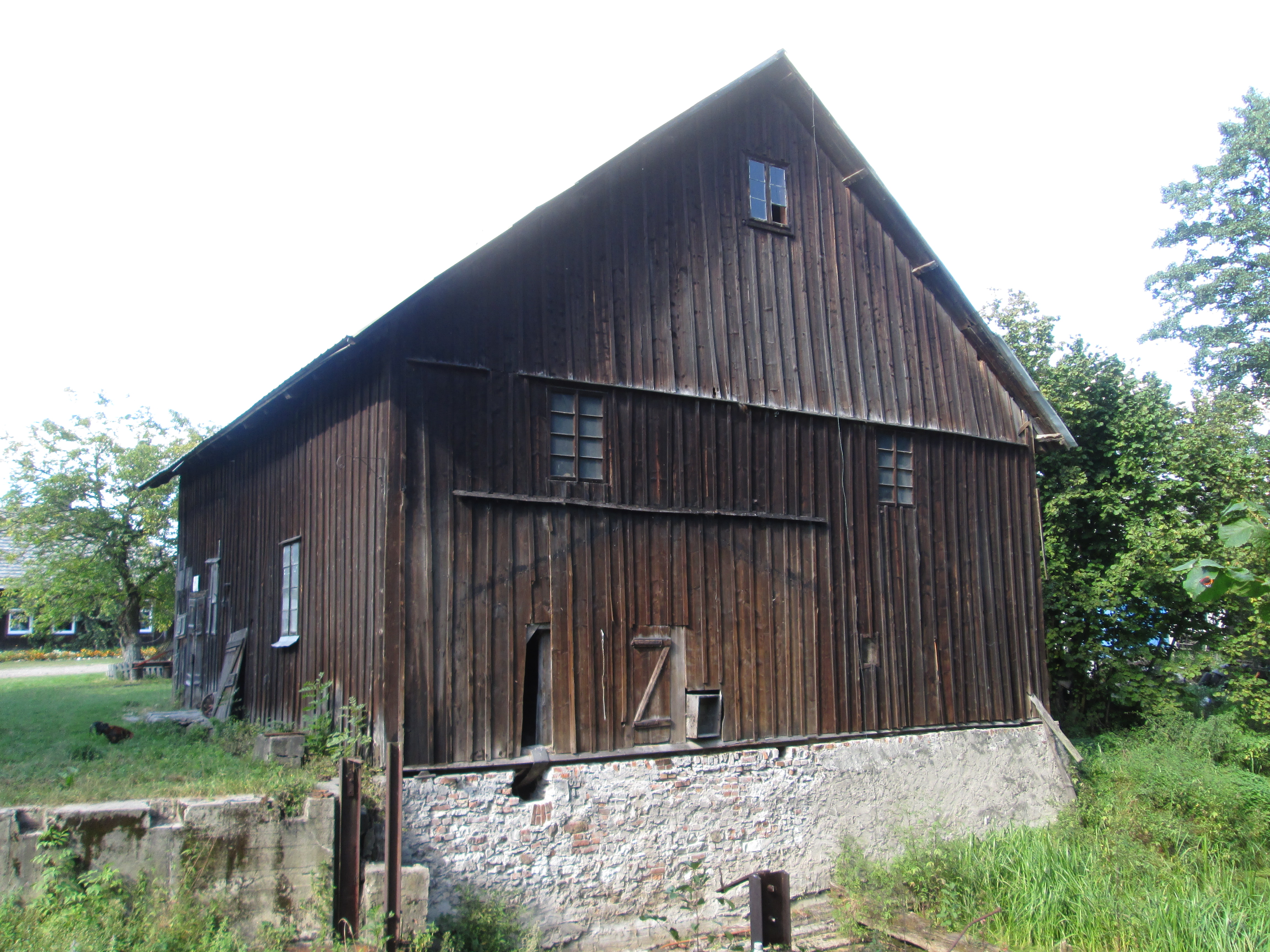

- Location within Poland
- Coordinates: 50°46′N 19°30′E
- Country: Poland
- Voivodeship: Silesian
- County: Częstochowa
- Gmina: Przyrów
- Population: 231

Wiercica [vjɛrˈt͡ɕit͡sa] is a village in the administrative district of Gmina Przyrów, within Częstochowa County, Silesian Voivodeship, in southern Poland.
