= Wincentów, Bełchatów County =

Wincentów
- Village
- Location within Poland
- Coordinates: 51°19′9″N 18°55′51″E
- Country: Poland
- Voivodeship: Łódź
- County: Bełchatów
- Gmina: Rusiec

Wincentów [vinˈt͡sɛntuf] is a village in the administrative district of Gmina Rusiec, within Bełchatów County, Łódź Voivodeship, in central Poland.
