= Leśniaki, Gmina Rusiec =

Leśniaki
- Village
- Location within Poland
- Coordinates: 51°17′N 19°4′E
- Country: Poland
- Voivodeship: Łódź
- County: Bełchatów
- Gmina: Rusiec

Leśniaki [lɛɕˈɲaki] is a village in the administrative district of Gmina Rusiec, within Bełchatów County, Łódź Voivodeship, in central Poland.
