= Dąbrówki Kobylańskie =

- Village
- Location within Poland
- Coordinates: 51°17′N 18°51′E
- Country: Poland
- Voivodeship: Łódź
- County: Bełchatów
- Gmina: Rusiec

Dąbrówki Kobylańskie (Polish pronunciation: [dɔmˈbrufkʲi kɔbɨˈlaj̃skʲɛ]) is a village in the administrative district of Gmina Rusiec, within Bełchatów County, Łódź Voivodeship, in central Poland.
