= Kuźnica, Gmina Rusiec =

Kuźnica
- Village
- Location within Poland
- Coordinates: 51°19′1″N 19°1′21″E
- Country: Poland
- Voivodeship: Łódź
- County: Bełchatów
- Gmina: Rusiec

Kuźnica (Polish pronunciation: [kuʑˈɲit͡sa]) is a village in the administrative district of Gmina Rusiec, within Bełchatów County, Łódź Voivodeship, in central Poland.
