= Niebyła, Silesian Voivodeship =

Niebyła
- Village
- Location within Poland
- Coordinates: 50°52′N 19°39′E
- Country: Poland
- Voivodeship: Silesian
- County: Częstochowa
- Gmina: Dąbrowa Zielona
- Population: 32

Niebyła [ɲɛˈbɨwa] is a village in the administrative district of Gmina Dąbrowa Zielona, within Częstochowa County, Silesian Voivodeship, in southern Poland.

The village had a population of 32 at the last count.
