= Gmina Przyrów =

Gmina Przyrów Przyrów Commune
- Gmina
- Coat of arms
- Interactive map of Gmina Przyrów
- Coordinates (Przyrów): 50°48′N 19°31′E
- Country: Poland
- Voivodeship: Silesian
- County: Częstochowa
- Seat: Przyrów

Area
  - Total: 80.44 km^{2} (31.06 sq mi)

Population (2019-06-30)
  - Total: 3,757
  - Density: 46.71/km^{2} (121.0/sq mi)
- Website: http://www.przyrow.pl

Gmina Przyrów is a rural gmina (administrative district) in Częstochowa County, Silesian Voivodeship, in southern Poland. Its seat is the village of Przyrów, which lies approximately 29 kilometres (18 mi) east of Częstochowa and 72 km (45 mi) north-east of the regional capital Katowice.

The gmina covers an area of 80.44 square kilometres (31.1 sq mi), and as of 2019 its total population is 3,757.

== Villages ==
Gmina Przyrów contains the villages and settlements of Aleksandrówka, Bolesławów, Julianka, Knieja, Kopaniny, Przyrów, Sieraków, Smyków, Stanisławów, Staropole, Sygontka, Wiercica, Wola Mokrzeska, Zalesice and Zarębice.

== Neighbouring gminas ==
Gmina Przyrów is bordered by the gminas of Dąbrowa Zielona, Janów, Koniecpol, Lelów and Mstów.
