= Ludwinów, Częstochowa County =

Ludwinów
- Settlement
- Location within Poland
- Coordinates: 50°48′N 19°38′E
- Country: Poland
- Voivodeship: Silesian
- County: Częstochowa
- Gmina: Koniecpol

Ludwinów [ludˈvinuf] is a settlement in the administrative district of Gmina Koniecpol, within Częstochowa County, Silesian Voivodeship, in southern Poland.
