= Gmina Dąbrowa Zielona =

Gmina Dąbrowa Zielona Dąbrowa Zielona Commune
- Gmina
- Flag Coat of arms
- Motto: Zielona Przestrzeń (Green Space)
- Interactive map of Gmina Dąbrowa Zielona
- Coordinates (Dąbrowa Zielona): 50°51′N 19°34′E
- Country: Poland
- Voivodeship: Silesian
- County: Częstochowa
- Seat: Dąbrowa Zielona

Government
  - Wójt: Joanna Sokolińska

Area
  - Total: 100.33 km^{2} (38.74 sq mi)

Population (2019-06-30)
  - Total: 3,867
  - Density: 38.54/km^{2} (99.83/sq mi)
- Postal code: 42-265
- Website: http://www.dabrowazielona.pl

Gmina Dąbrowa Zielona is a rural gmina (administrative district) in Częstochowa County, Silesian Voivodeship, in southern Poland. Its seat is the village of Dąbrowa Zielona, which lies approximately 33 kilometres (21 mi) east of Częstochowa and 78 km (48 mi) north-east of the regional capital Katowice.

The gmina covers an area of 100.33 square kilometres (38.7 sq mi), and as of 2019 its total population is 3,867.

== Villages ==
Gmina Dąbrowa Zielona contains the villages and settlements of Borowce, Cielętniki, Cudków, Dąbek, Dąbrowa Zielona, Lipie, Milionów, Niebyła, Nowa Wieś, Olbrachcice, Raczkowice, Raczkowice-Kolonia, Rogaczew, Soborzyce, Święta Anna and Ulesie.

== Neighbouring gminas ==
Gmina Dąbrowa Zielona is bordered by the gminas of Gidle, Kłomnice, Koniecpol, Mstów, Przyrów and Żytno.
