= Dęby Wolskie-Kolonia =

- Village
- Location within Poland
- Coordinates: 51°17′N 18°55′E
- Country: Poland
- Voivodeship: Łódź
- County: Bełchatów
- Gmina: Rusiec

Dęby Wolskie-Kolonia [ˈdɛmbɨ ˈvɔlskʲɛ kɔˈlɔɲa] is a village in the administrative district of Gmina Rusiec, within Bełchatów County, Łódź Voivodeship, in central Poland.
