= Borek, Częstochowa County =

Borek
- Village
- Location within Poland
- Coordinates: 50°48′45″N 19°40′34″E
- Country: Poland
- Voivodeship: Silesian
- County: Częstochowa
- Gmina: Koniecpol

Borek [ˈbɔrɛk] is a village in the administrative district of Gmina Koniecpol, within Częstochowa County, Silesian Voivodeship, in southern Poland.
