= Michałów, Gmina Koniecpol =

Michałów
- Village
- Location within Poland
- Coordinates: 50°46′32″N 19°44′40″E
- Country: Poland
- Voivodeship: Silesian
- County: Częstochowa
- Gmina: Koniecpol
- Population: 52

Michałów [miˈxawuf] is a village in the administrative district of Gmina Koniecpol, within Częstochowa County, Silesian Voivodeship, in southern Poland.
