= Przyrów =

- Town
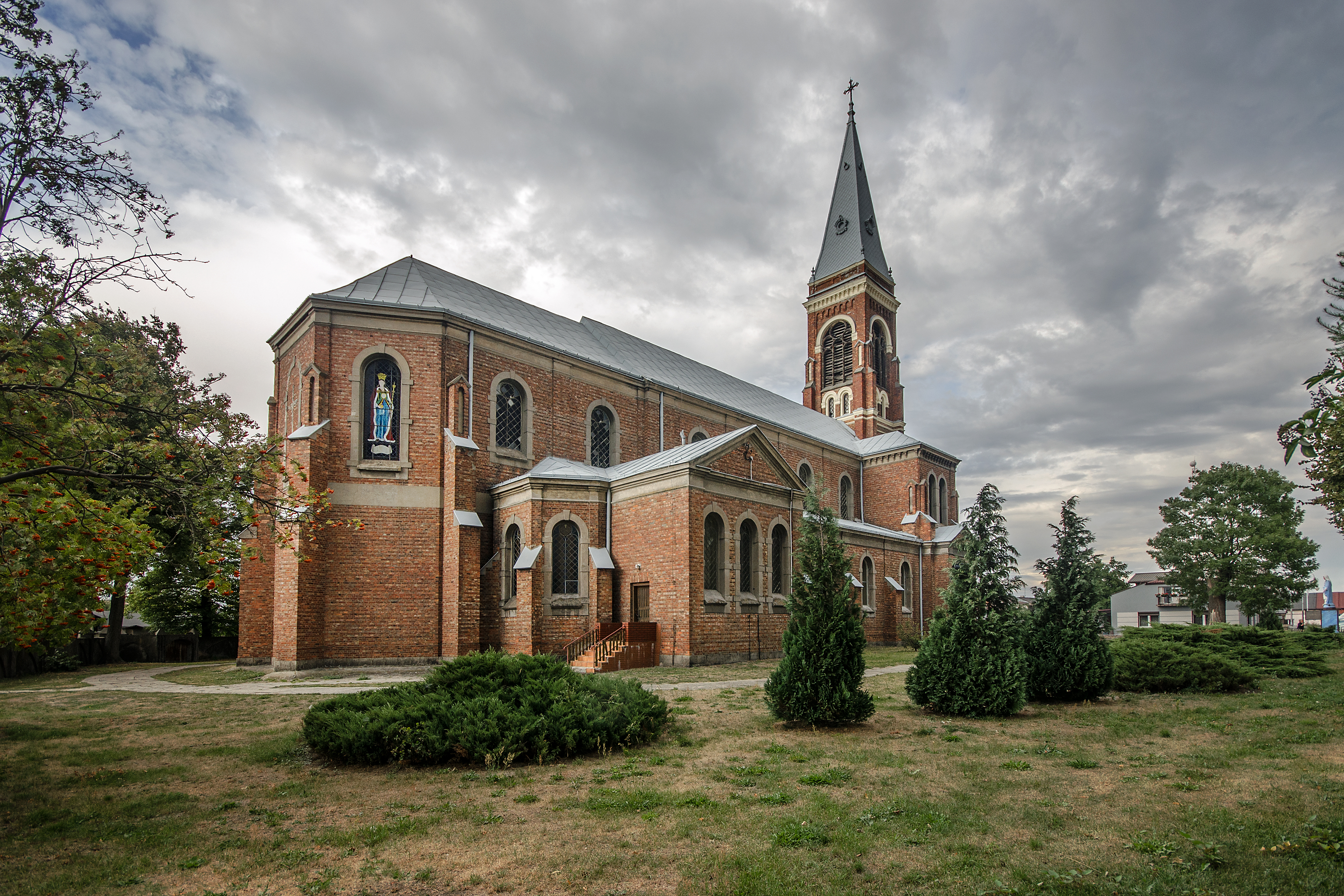
- Blessed Virgin Mary of the Scapular and Saint Dorothy church

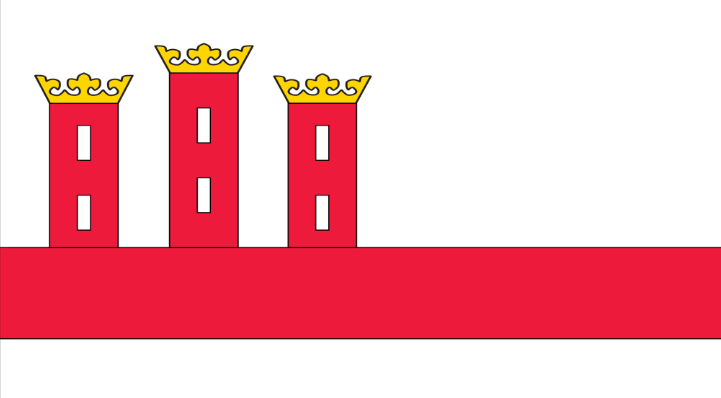
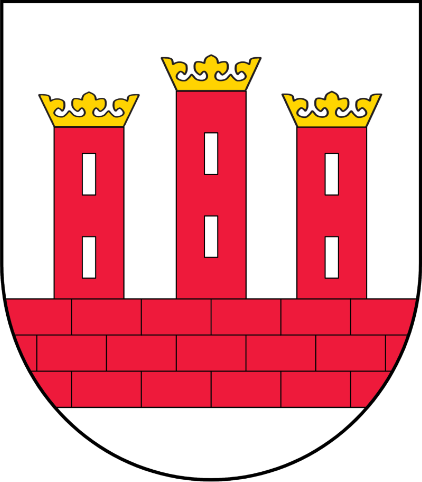
- Flag Coat of arms

- Location within Poland
- Coordinates: 50°48′N 19°31′E
- Country: Poland
- Voivodeship: Silesian
- County: Częstochowa
- Gmina: Przyrów
- Founded: 1369

Population
  - Total: 1,222
- Time zone: UTC+1 (CET)
  - Summer (DST): UTC+2 (CEST)
- Vehicle registration: SCZ

Przyrów [ˈpʂɨruf] is a town in Częstochowa County, Silesian Voivodeship, in southern Poland. It is the seat of the gmina (administrative district) called Gmina Przyrów. Przyrów is part of historic province of Lesser Poland.

== History ==
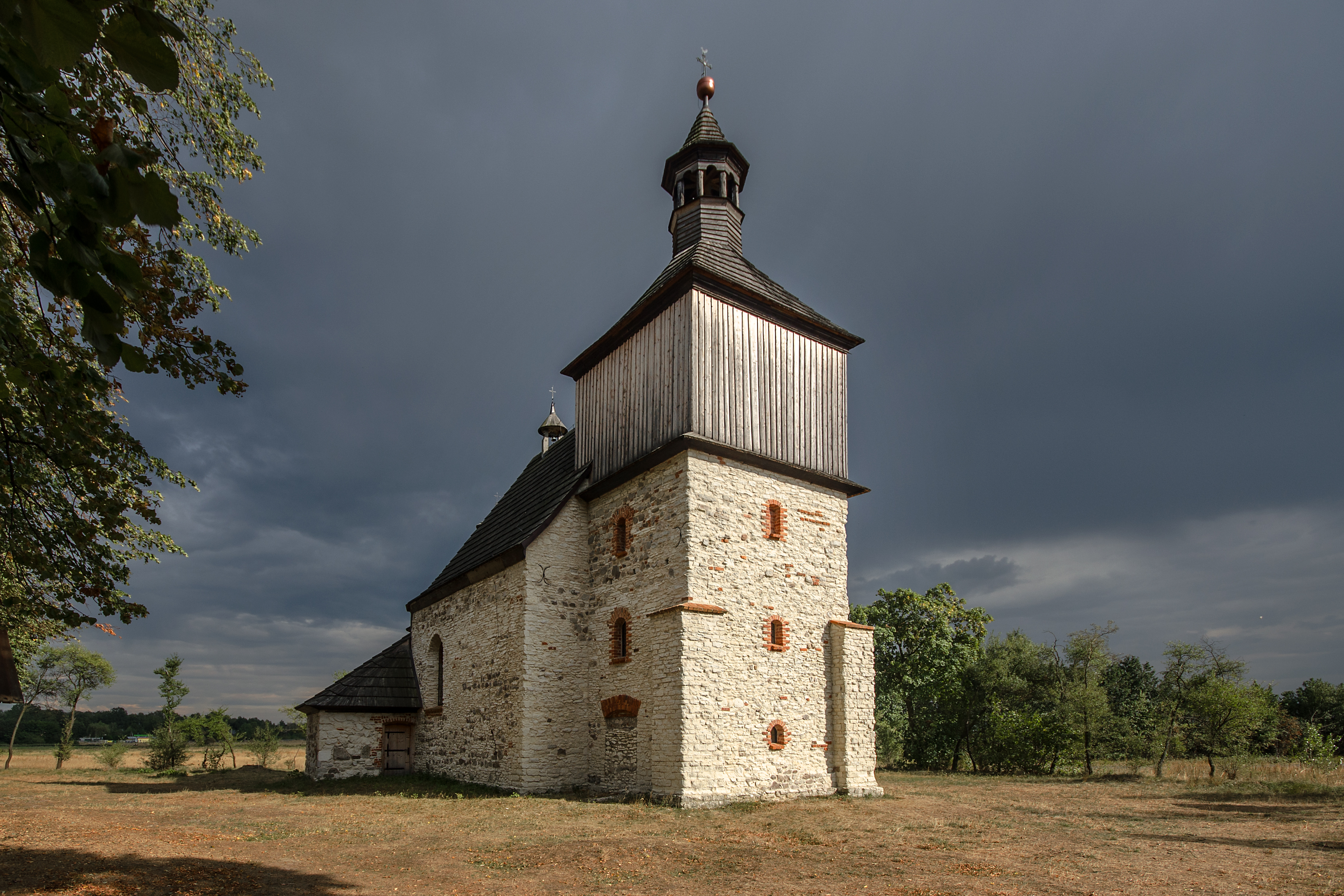
Baroque Saint Nicholas church

Przyrów was founded in 1369, when King Casimir III the Great granted Środa town rights modeled after Środa Śląska, in a location near the village of Komorów. Following other medieval towns of Europe, Przyrów had a market square, and several streets. Its first wójt was Jakub Rechicki of Nagłowice, and town's privileges were confirmed by several other Polish kings. In the 14th century Przyrów emerged as an important center of beer production. By the 15th century, the village Komorów was included within the town limits of Przyrów. It was a royal town, with a wójt and a council, administratively located in the Lelów County, Kraków Voivodeship, Lesser Poland Province. In 1554, King Sigismund II Augustus confirmed the municipal privileges and established three annual fairs. In 1620, it had 136 houses, and prospered together with whole Lesser Poland (see Polish Golden Age). In 1669, King Michał Korybut Wiśniowiecki founded three more annual fairs.

On November 8, 1655, Przyrów was completely destroyed in the Swedish invasion of Poland, and the town never recovered from the destruction. After the invasion, the number of still existing houses was reduced to 55, and the population shrank to 330. In early November 1655, Swedish troops under General Burchard Müller von der Luhnen (who also commanded the Siege of Jasna Góra) demanded large amounts of bread, oats, meats, beer, butter and hay. Since residents of Przyrów did not have enough goods, von der Luhnen ordered the destruction of the town.

In 1793 Przyrów was annexed in the Second Partition of Poland by the Kingdom of Prussia, and made part of New Silesia. From 1807 it belonged to the Duchy of Warsaw, and after its dissolution in 1815 it became part of Russian-controlled Congress Poland. In the early 19th century Przyrów had 222 houses and the population of app. 1,200. After January Uprising, Russian government deprived Przyrów of its town rights. By 1880, the population grew to almost 2,500, with a 40% Jewish minority. In the Second Polish Republic and in 1945–1950, Przyrów belonged to Kielce Voivodeship. Since 1950, it has been administratively tied with either Katowice, or Częstochowa.

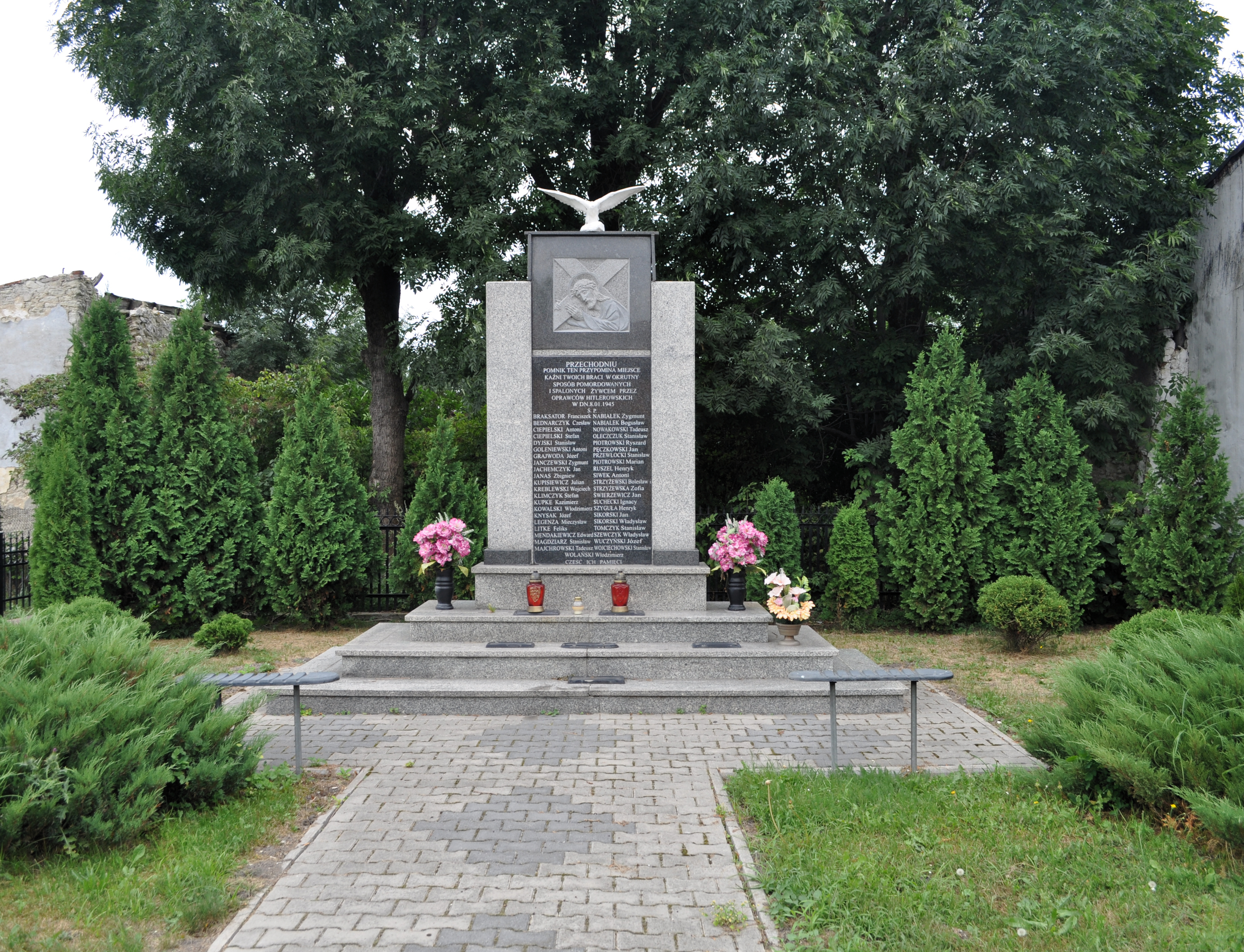
Memorial to the victims of the massacre from 1945

Following the joint German-Soviet invasion of Poland, which started World War II in 1939, it was occupied by Germany until 1945. The occupiers operated a forced labour camp for Jews, and committed a massacre of 43 Poles on 8 January 1945 (see also Nazi crimes against the Polish nation).
