= Dąbrowa, Gmina Rusiec =

Dąbrowa
- Village
- Location within Poland
- Coordinates: 51°20′11″N 18°56′32″E
- Country: Poland
- Voivodeship: Łódź
- County: Bełchatów
- Gmina: Rusiec

Dąbrowa [dɔmˈbrɔva] is a village in the administrative district of Gmina Rusiec, within Bełchatów County, Łódź Voivodeship, in central Poland.
