= Julianka, Silesian Voivodeship =

Julianka
- Village
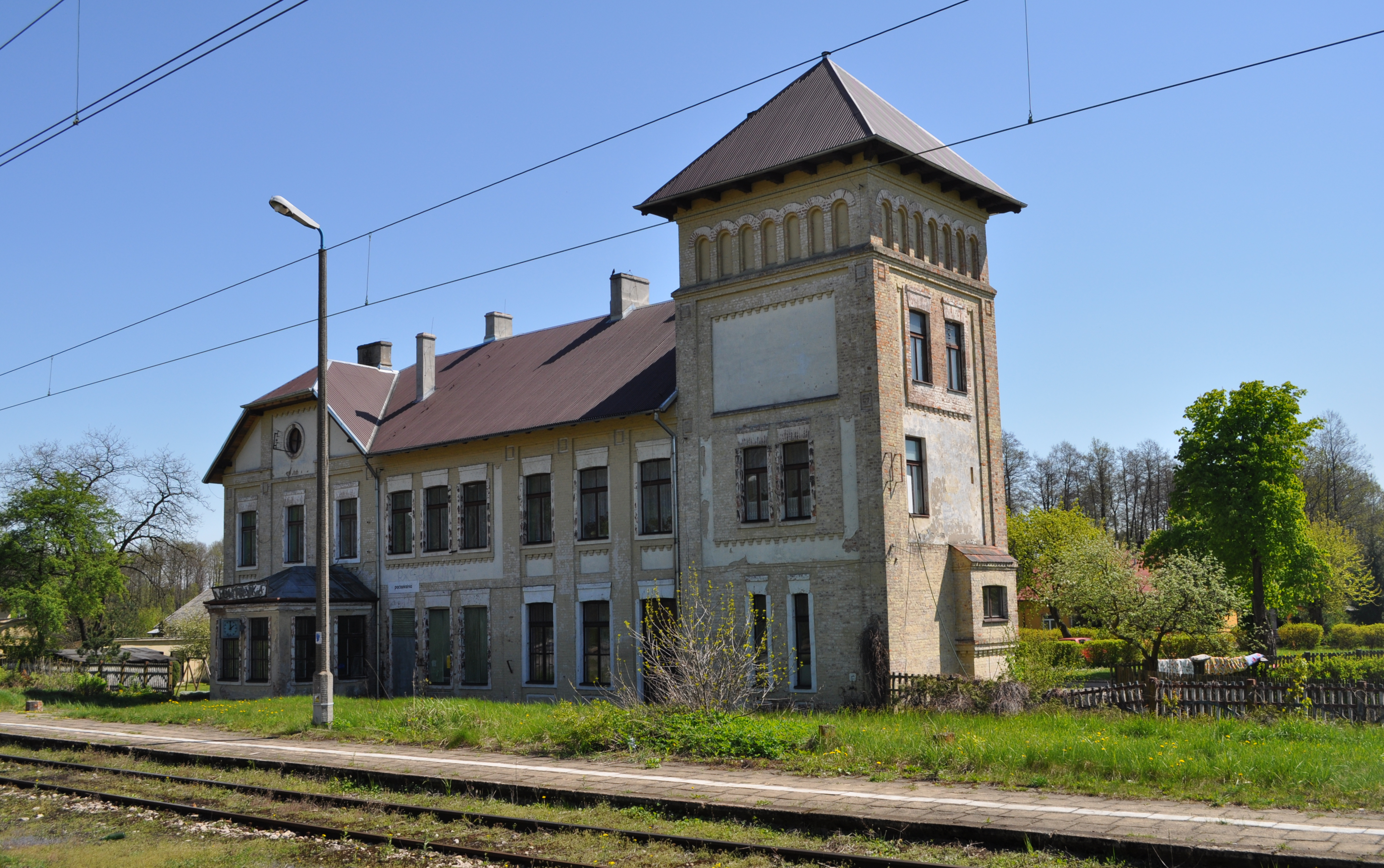
- Train station in Julianka

- Location within Poland
- Coordinates: 50°45′N 19°28′E
- Country: Poland
- Voivodeship: Silesian
- County: Częstochowa
- Gmina: Przyrów
- Population: 139
- Time zone: UTC+1 (CET)
  - Summer (DST): UTC+2 (CEST)
- Vehicle registration: SCZ

Julianka [juˈljanka] is a village in the administrative district of Gmina Przyrów, within Częstochowa County, Silesian Voivodeship, in southern Poland.

During World War II the village was occupied by Germany. In September 1944, during the Warsaw Uprising, the Germans carried out deportations of Varsovians from the Dulag 121 camp in Pruszków, where they were initially imprisoned, to Julianka. Those Poles were mainly old people, ill people and women with children.
