= Piaski, Częstochowa County =

Piaski
- Village
- Location within Poland
- Coordinates: 50°49′54″N 19°49′18″E
- Country: Poland
- Voivodeship: Silesian
- County: Częstochowa
- Gmina: Koniecpol
- Time zone: UTC+1 (CET)
  - Summer (DST): UTC+2 (CEST)
- Postal code: 42-230
- Vehicle registration: SCZ

Piaski (Polish pronunciation: [ˈpjaskʲi]) is a village in the administrative district of Gmina Koniecpol, within Częstochowa County, Silesian Voivodeship, in southern Poland.
