= Mierzynów =

- Village
- Location within Poland
- Coordinates: 51°18′46″N 18°54′27″E
- Country: Poland
- Voivodeship: Łódź
- County: Bełchatów
- Gmina: Rusiec

Mierzynów [mjɛˈʐɨnuf] is a village in the administrative district of Gmina Rusiec, within Bełchatów County, Łódź Voivodeship, in central Poland.
