= Bolesławów, Łódź Voivodeship =

Bolesławów
- Village
- Location within Poland
- Coordinates: 51°19′N 18°55′E
- Country: Poland
- Voivodeship: Łódź
- County: Bełchatów
- Gmina: Rusiec

Bolesławów [bɔlɛˈswavuf] is a village in the administrative district of Gmina Rusiec, within Bełchatów County, Łódź Voivodeship, in central Poland.
