= Dąbrowa Zielona =

- Village
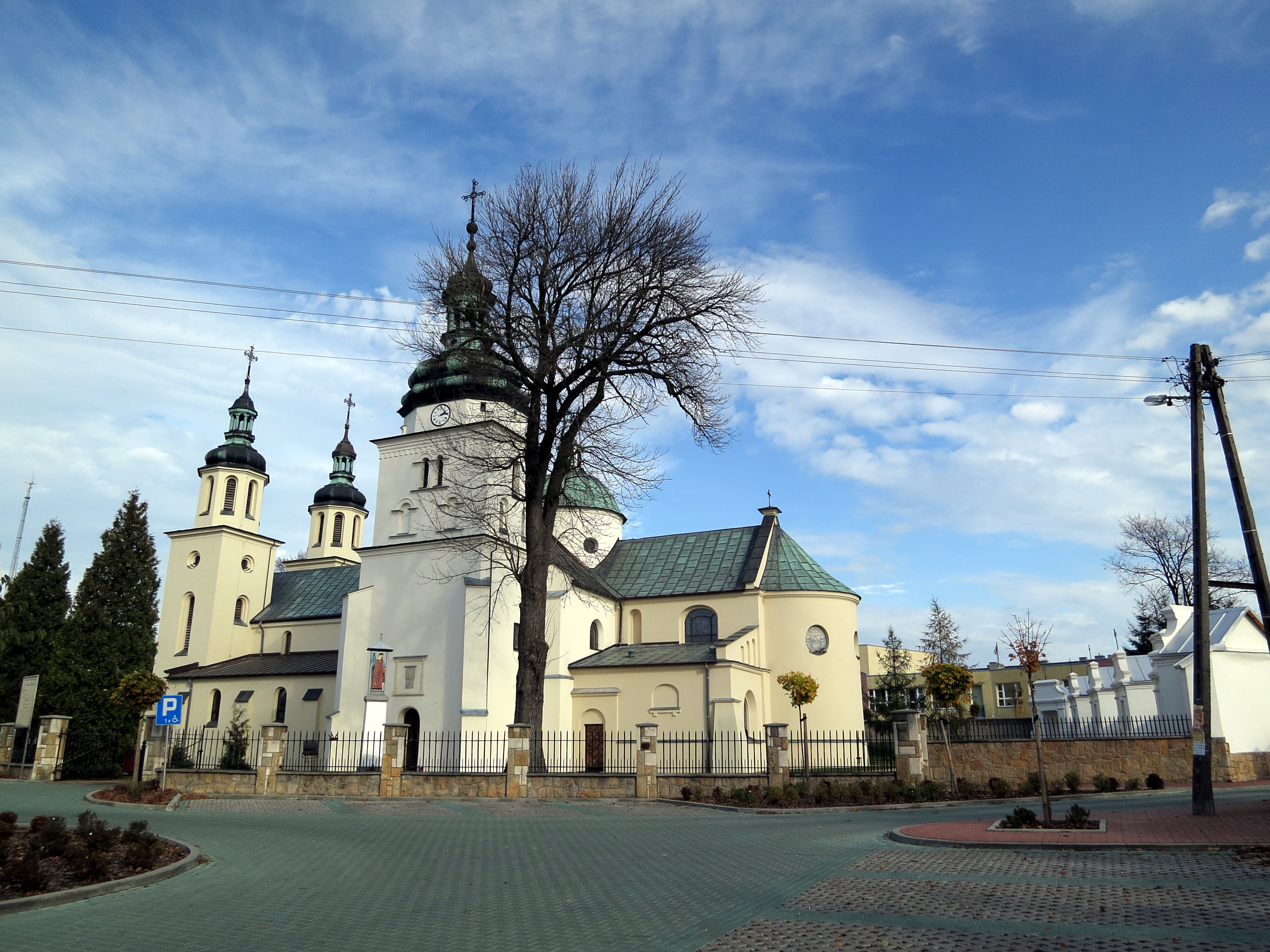
- Catholic church

- Location within Poland
- Coordinates: 50°50′N 19°33′E
- Country: Poland
- Voivodeship: Silesian
- County: Częstochowa
- Gmina: Dąbrowa Zielona
- Population: 881

Dąbrowa Zielona (Polish pronunciation: [dɔmˈbrɔva ʑɛˈlɔna]) is a village in Częstochowa County, Silesian Voivodeship, in southern Poland. It is the seat of the gmina (administrative district) called Gmina Dąbrowa Zielona.
