= Conrad Schirokauer =

German-American historian and writer (1929–2018)

Conrad Schirokauer (April 29, 1929 – September 19, 2018) was a German-American historian and writer. His father, Arno Schirokauer, was a German-Jewish literary scholar and philologist.

Schirokauer's family left Germany when he was six years old, in flight from the Nazi regime, and, after three years in Italy, eventually migrated to the United States where they settled in Tennessee in 1938, and eventually moved to Baltimore, Maryland. He graduated high school from Williston Academy in 1946 as the valedictorian.

He completed his Bachelor of Arts in history at Yale College in 1950 and his PhD in history at Stanford University in 1960 with a dissertation on 12th century Chinese political thought. From 1962 to 1991, he taught history, first as an assistant professor, then as an associate and from 1977 as full professor, at the City College of New York. He specialized in East Asian historiography, particularly Chinese and Japanese history.

Conrad Schirokauer married Lore Strich in November 1956. They had met as children in Italy in the mid-thirties.

Schirokauer died on September 19, 2018, at the age of 89.

== Bibliography ==
Schirokauer is the author of books including:

- A Brief History of Chinese and Japanese Civilizations (1978), also published separately as A Brief History of Chinese Civilization and A Brief History of Japanese Civilization
- Chu Hsi's political career: A study in ambivalence

With Robert P. Hymes, he is the co-editor of:

- Ordering the World: Approaches to State and Society in Sung Dynasty China (1993)

He is also the translator of a book by Ichisada Miyazaki:

- China's Examination Hell: The Civil Service Examinations of Imperial China

== Criticism ==
Laurence Grambow Wolf and Roger Mark Selya wrote that Schirokaue's "the treatment of Japan's current standard of living is not balanced. Against the positives one needs also to treat the negatives: environmental pollution, lack of recreational space, hectic commuting, high housing costs, etc."
