= Gmina Aleksandrów =

Gmina Aleksandrów may refer to either of the following administrative districts in Poland:

- Gmina Aleksandrów, Łódź Voivodeship (central Poland)
- Gmina Aleksandrów, Lublin Voivodeship (east Poland)

== See also ==
- Gmina Aleksandrów Kujawski
- Gmina Aleksandrów Łódzki
