= Pawłów, Łódź Voivodeship =

Village in Gmina Rusiec, Poland

Pawłów
- Village
- Location within Poland
- Coordinates: 51°17′49″N 19°03′01″E
- Country: Poland
- Voivodeship: Łódź
- County: Bełchatów
- Gmina: Rusiec

Pawłów [ˈpavwuf] is a village in the administrative district of Gmina Rusiec, within Bełchatów County, Łódź Voivodeship, in central Poland.
