= Sieraków, Silesian Voivodeship =

Sieraków
- Village
- Location within Poland
- Coordinates: 50°44′55″N 19°30′5″E
- Country: Poland
- Voivodeship: Silesian
- County: Częstochowa
- Gmina: Przyrów
- Population: 242

Sieraków (Polish pronunciation: [ɕɛˈrakuf]) is a village in the administrative district of Gmina Przyrów, within Częstochowa County, Silesian Voivodeship, in southern Poland.

== People ==
- Klaus Richter (MdB)
