= Zagrodniki, Łódź Voivodeship =

Zagrodniki
- Village
- Location within Poland
- Coordinates: 51°20′N 19°3′E
- Country: Poland
- Voivodeship: Łódź
- County: Bełchatów
- Gmina: Rusiec
- Population: 50

Zagrodniki [zaɡrɔdˈniki] is a village in the administrative district of Gmina Rusiec, within Bełchatów County, Łódź Voivodeship, in central Poland.
