= Aleksandrów, Bełchatów County =

Aleksandrów
- Village
- Location within Poland
- Coordinates: 51°17′23″N 18°53′36″E
- Country: Poland
- Voivodeship: Łódź
- County: Bełchatów
- Gmina: Rusiec

Aleksandrów [alɛkˈsandruf] is a village in the administrative district of Gmina Rusiec, within Bełchatów County, Łódź Voivodeship, in central Poland.
