= Bolesławów, Silesian Voivodeship =

Bolesławów
- Village
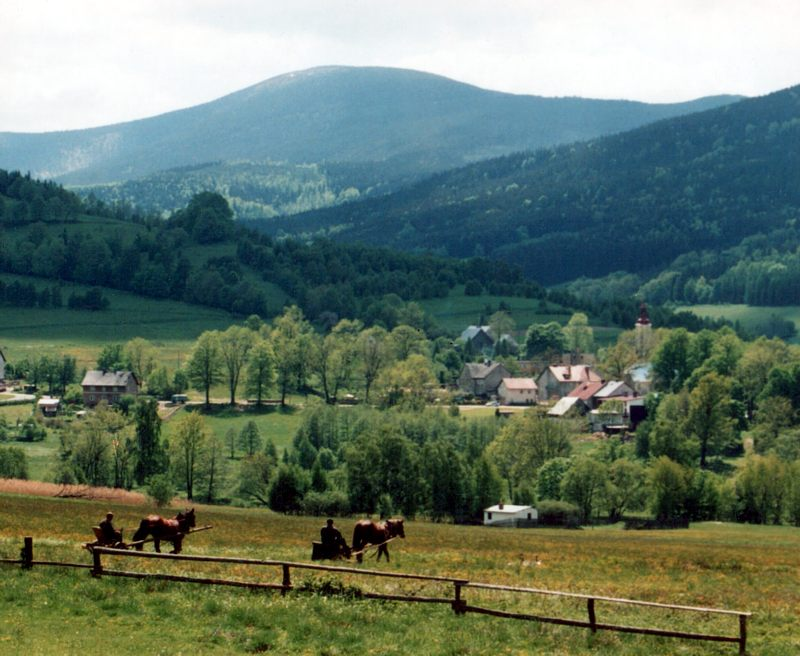

- Location within Poland
- Coordinates: 50°15′22″N 16°53′38″E
- Country: Poland
- Voivodeship: Silesian
- County: Częstochowa
- Gmina: Przyrów
- Population: 169

Bolesławów [bɔlɛˈswavuf] is a village in the administrative district of Gmina Przyrów, within Częstochowa County, Silesian Voivodeship, in southern Poland.

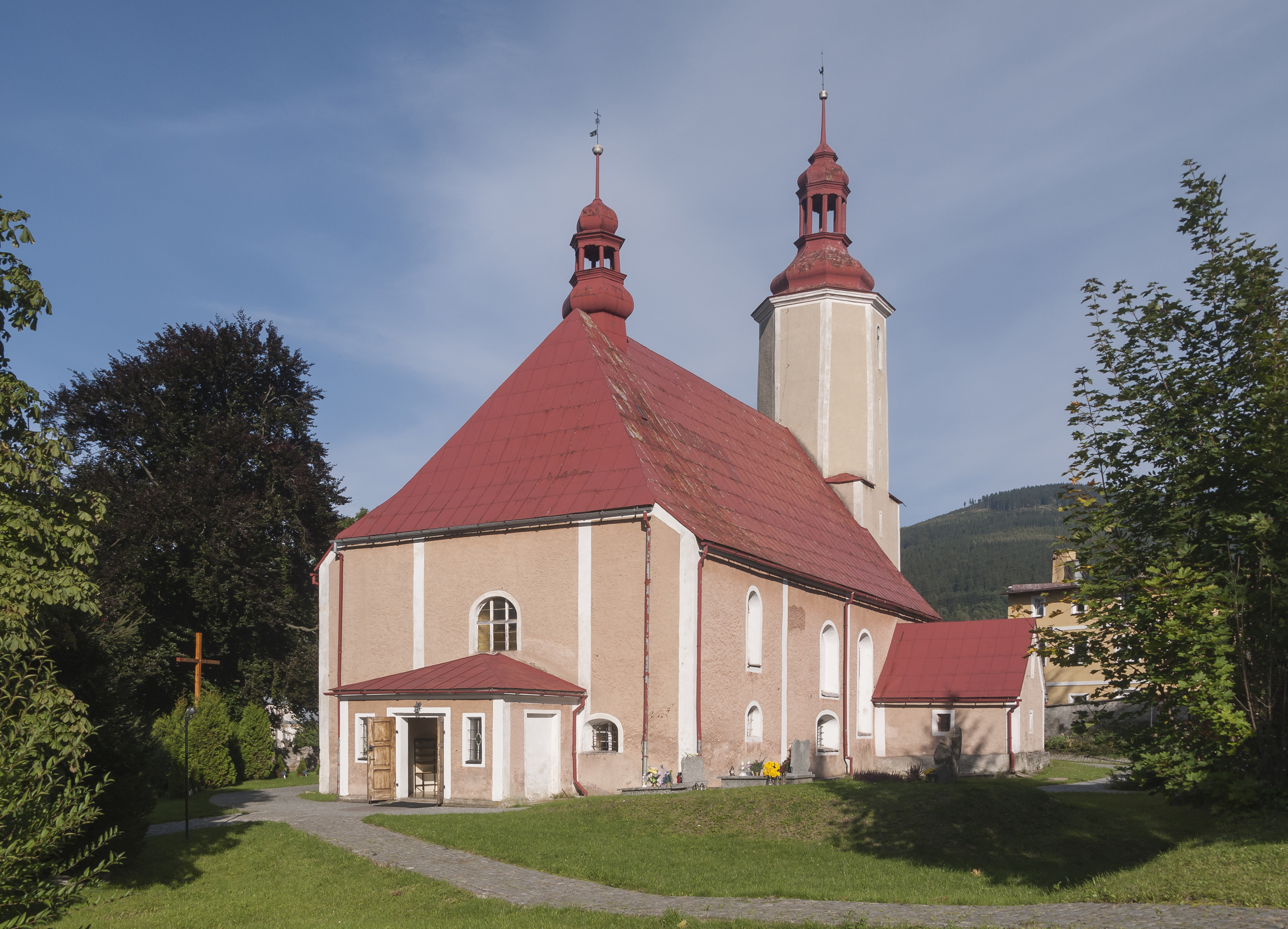
Saint Joseph church
