= Andrzejów, Bełchatów County =

Andrzejów
- Village
- Location within Poland
- Coordinates: 51°17′45″N 19°2′58″E
- Country: Poland
- Voivodeship: Łódź
- County: Bełchatów
- Gmina: Rusiec
- Population: 82

Andrzejów [anˈdʐɛjuf] is a village in the administrative district of Gmina Rusiec, within Bełchatów County, Łódź Voivodeship, in central Poland.
