= Nowa Wola, Gmina Rusiec =

Nowa Wola
- Village
- Location within Poland
- Coordinates: 51°19′31″N 18°53′5″E
- Country: Poland
- Voivodeship: Łódź
- County: Bełchatów
- Gmina: Rusiec

Nowa Wola [ˈnɔva ˈvɔla] is a village in the administrative district of Gmina Rusiec, within Bełchatów County, Łódź Voivodeship, in central Poland.
