= Wąsosz, Gmina Koniecpol =

Wąsosz
- Village
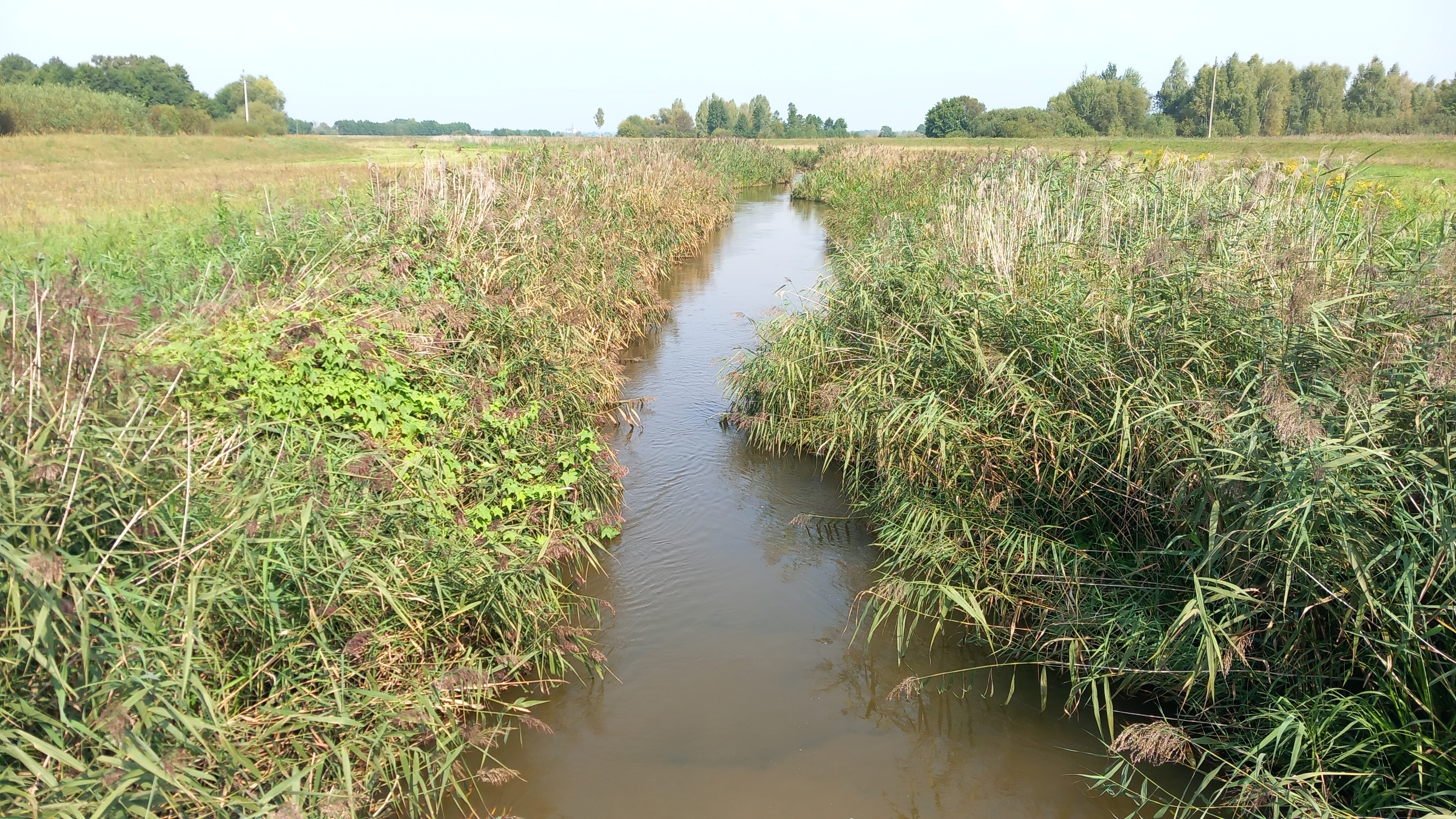

- Location within Poland
- Coordinates: 50°44′N 19°41′E
- Country: Poland
- Voivodeship: Silesian
- County: Częstochowa
- Gmina: Koniecpol

Population
  - Total: 81
- Time zone: UTC+1 (CET)
  - Summer (DST): UTC+2 (CEST)
- Postal code: 42-230

Wąsosz [ˈvɔ̃sɔʂ] is a village in the administrative district of Gmina Koniecpol, within Częstochowa County, Silesian Voivodeship, in southern Poland.
