= Nagorski family with Ostoja coat of arms =

Herb szlachecki Nagórski

Polish medieval CoA Ostoja

The Nagorski family - Polish noble family with the coat of arms of Ostoja, belonging to the heraldic Clan Ostoja (Moscics), originating from Nagorzyce (Nagórzyce) in the former province Sandomierz.

== The oldest source certificates concerning the family ==
Listed below are selected source certificates concerning the Nagórski family of Ostoja CoA and the village of Nagorzyce from the 15th century.

- Władysław Jagiełło, in 1419, transferred the villages of Milejowice and Nagorzyce to the Środa law, which at that time belonged to Michał Oglandowski and Michał Gładki from Milejowice. In 1449, Janowice and Wierzbątowice, belonging to the Łysogóra abbey, were separated from Nagorzyce, Milejowice and Roztylice.
- Jan Długosz mentioned the Nagórski coat of arms Ostoja, who inherited in the second half of the 15th century in Roztylice and Nagórzyce (Nagórzyce) and in Modrzew, located near Bostów, in the former province Sandomierz.
- In the years 1470–1480, the sources mention Jan of Nagorzyce, who, apart from the landed estates in Nagorzyce, also had 1 knightly Ian in Jeżów, which was most likely given to him by the abbot of the Łysogóra Benedictines, and from whom he paid the abbey a tithe.
- According to prof. Mark Derwich Nagórscy coat of arms Ostoja of Nagorzyce, Roztylice and Modrzewia were related in the 15th century to the Krępski coat of arms Ostoja of Krępa and Mydłowiec.

== The estates belonging to the family ==
Listed below are the most important lands belonging to the Nagorski family with Ostoja coat of arms.

Nagorzyce (Nagórzyce), Roztylice, Modrzewie, Jeżów, Grabownica.

== Family representatives ==
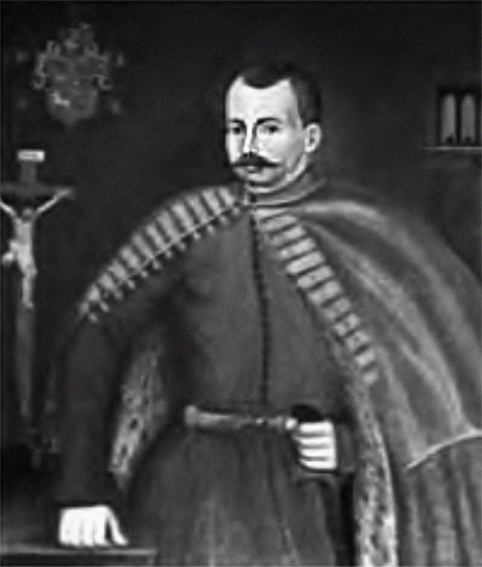
Portrait of Hieronim Nagórski, Ostoja coat of arms, founder of the Church of St. Nicholas in Grabownica

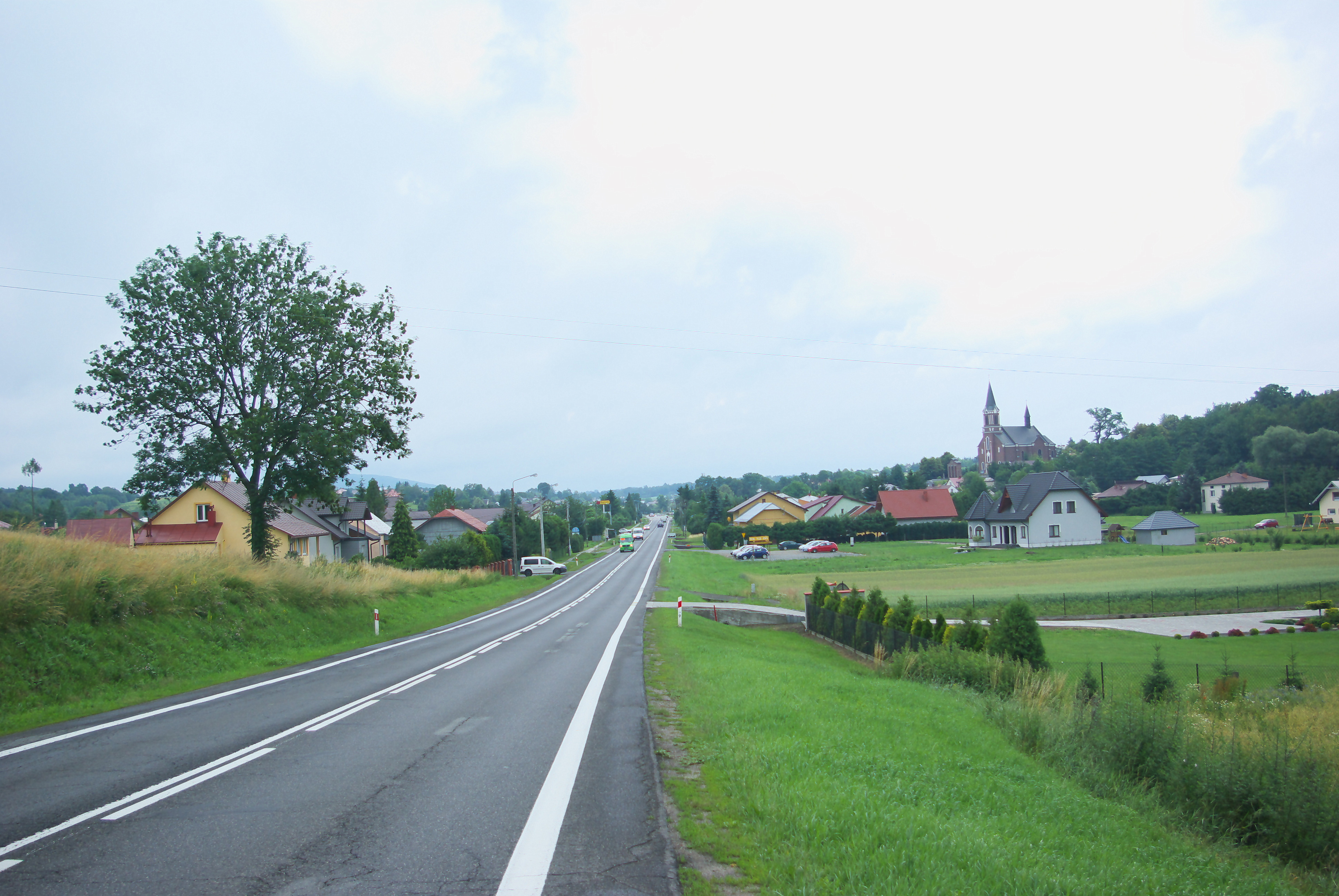
Grabownica, view from 2018.

- Jan of Nagorzyce Nagorski (died after 1480) - apart from the estate in Nagorzyce, he also owned one knightly Ian in Jeżów, which was most likely given to him by the abbot of the Łysogóra Benedictines, and from which he paid a tithe to the abbey. His son Stanisław appears in 1463 in the company of people from the vicinity of Abbot Michael of Kleparz, incl. Jakub Witosławski and Dawid from Wawrzeńczyce, Master of Liberal Arts at the University of Krakow. In 1531 only a quarter of a Jan from the Nagórski part remained in Jeżów. As a result of family divisions, the remaining fields could be incorporated into the surrounding villages, especially in Nagorzyce or Roztylice. Jan of Nagorzyce Nagórski was mentioned by Jan Długosz in Liber beneficiorum dioecesis Cracoviensis and is the first recorded in Nagórski sources that can be associated with the Ostoje family. Nagórski was also mentioned in Count Seweryn's herbarium Uruski.
- Filip Nagórski of Roztylice (died after 1480) - heir of landed estates in Roztylice.
- Stanisław Nagórski of Nagorzyce (Nagórzyce) (died after 1463) - a courtier of the abbot of Łysogóra, son of Jan of Nagorzyce, heir of land estates in Nagórzyce and Jeżów.
- Hieronim Nagórski (died in 1636) - heir of Grabownica, founder of the church of St. Nicholas in Grabownica, participant in the Battle of Chocim in 1621.
- Salomea Nagórska (died after 1655) - heiress of the lands in Grabownica, daughter of Hieronim Nagórski and Jadwiga née Pełków. There is a romantic and at the same time tragic story related to her person, described by Władysław Łoziński. According to this description, Salomea was engaged to Stanisław Przedwojowski, a hussar companion. However, despite this, her brother-in-law, Jacek Krasowski, kidnapped her to marry Gabriel Boratyński. Just before the wedding, the beloved of Salomea Nagórska, Stanisław Przedwojowski, rescued the kidnapped woman from his banner with the help of several comrades. The Salomea and Stanisław Przedwojowski family soon enjoyed their happiness. In 1645, a neighbor, Stanisław Kozłowski, a cupbearer of Sanok, attacked their manor in Grabownica. As a result of this inn, Salomea's husband died at the hands of Kozłowski's henchmen. After a period of mourning, Salomea née Nagórskie 1v. Przedwojowska remarried with Jan Fredro, with whom she had nine children.
- Wojciech Nagórski (died around 1661) - Catholic priest, pastor of the parish in Grabownica (1637-1661). Son of Hieronim Nagórski and Jadwiga née Pełki. In 1621 he took part in the Battle of Khotyn against the Turkish army, where his older brother died. Then, his father, Hieronim Nagórski, made an oath to God that if they both returned alive from the war expedition, he would devote him to priestly service. The promise was fulfilled because Wojciech became a priest and on August 31, 1637, he took over the rectory of Grabownica. In 1640 his mother Jadwiga died. In her will, she bequeathed in favor of the church of St. Nicholas in Grabownica 8 cows, 5 morga of meadow and 10,000 florins for the maintenance of two priests, an organist and a cantor. However, the will was never fulfilled because Grabownica was taken over by Jacek Krasowski, husband of Father Nagórski's sister - Katarzyna. Wojciech Nagórski was the parish priest of Grabownica until 1661. He was immortalized in the painting of St. Nicholas, as one of the people who adore the saint (including in the company of his father, mother and sisters). This painting, funded in 1633 by Jadwiga Pełków Nagórska, is located in the main altar of the church in Grabownica Starzeniaska.
- Andrzej Nagórski (died after 1671) - cavalry companion, captain of the infantry banner of the choir of the province of Lublin and Bełz, member of the election Sejm (1669).
- Stanisław Nagórski (died in 1706) - a lieutenant of cavalry, a Bełz coach in 1698, the sub-seat of Nowogrod Siewierski in the years 1697–1698, a member of parliament.
- Andrzej Nagórski (1643-1710) - prof. rhetoric and moral theology, prefect of Jesuit schools, missionary, rector of colleges in Kalisz and Lublin, secretary of the Polish provincial (1703-1705).

== See also ==
- Ostoja CoA
- Clan of Ostoja

== Bibliography ==
- Teki Dworzaczka. Materiały historyczno-genealogiczne do dziejów szlachty wielkopolskiej XV-XX w., Biblioteka Kórnicka PAN, Kórnik-Poznań 1995-2019 - Teki Dworzaczka.
- K. Niesiecki, Herbarz polski, wyd. J.N. Bobrowicz, Lipsk 1839–1845, t. VI, s. 510.
- S. Uruski, Rodzina. Herbarz szlachty polskiej, Warszawa 1915, t. XII, s. 10–12.
- T. Jurek (red.), Słownik historyczno-geograficzny ziem polskich w średniowieczu, Instytut Historii Polskiej Akademii Nauk, 2010–2019, Benedyktyni, s. 90–93, 119.
- M. Derwich, Klasztor Św. Krzyża na Łysej Górze a rycerstwo sandomierskie, [w:] "Genealogia. Studia nad wspólnotami krewniaczymi i terytorialnymi w Polsce średniowiecznej na tle porównawczym. (Materiały sympozjum odbytego w dniach 21–23 IX 1983 r. w Golubiu-Dobrzyniu)", red. J. Hertel, J. Wroniszewski, Toruń 1987, s. 149–171.
- M. Derwich, Benedyktyński klasztor św. Krzyża na Łysej Górze w średniowieczu, Warsuwa-Wrocław 1992.
- A. Przeździecki (oprac.), Jana Długosza kanonika krakowskiego dzieła wszystkie. T. 9, Liber beneficiorum dioecesis cracoviensis nunc primum e codice autographo editus, Kraków 1864, t. II, s. 474.
- A. Przeździecki (oprac.), Jana Długosza kanonika krakowskiego dzieła wszystkie. T. 9, Liber beneficiorum dioecesis cracoviensis nunc primum e codice autographo editus, Kraków 1864, t. III, s. 237.
- S. Uruski, Rodzina. Herbarz szlachty polskiej, Warszawa 1915, t. XII, s. 10.
- T. Jurek (red.), Słownik historyczno-geograficzny ziem polskich w średniowieczu, Instytut Historii Polskiej Akademii Nauk, 2010–2019, Benedyktyni, s. 90–93.
- M. Derwich, Klasztor Św. Krzyża na Łysej Górze a rycerstwo sandomierskie, [w:] "Genealogia. Studia nad wspólnotami krewniaczymi i terytorialnymi w Polsce średniowiecznej na tle porównawczym. (Materiały sympozjum odbytego w dniach 21–23 IX 1983 r. w Golubiu-Dobrzyniu)", red. J. Hertel, J. Wroniszewski, Toruń 1987, s. 149–171.
- M. Derwich, Benedyktyński klasztor św. Krzyża na Łysej Górze w średniowieczu, [Warsuwa-Wrocław 1992.
- K. Niesiecki, Herbarz polski, wyd. J.N. Bobrowicz, Lipsk 1839–1845, t. VI, s. 510.
- A. Przeździecki (oprac.), Jana Długosza kanonika krakowskiego dzieła wszystkie. T. 9, Liber beneficiorum dioecesis cracoviensis nunc primum e codice autographo editus, Kraków 1864, t. III, s. 237.
