= Jeżów =

Jeżów may refer to:

- Jeżów, Jawor County in Lower Silesian Voivodeship (south-west Poland)
- Jeżów, Brzeziny County in Łódź Voivodeship (central Poland)
- Jeżów, Piotrków County in Łódź Voivodeship (central Poland)
- Jeżów, Lublin Voivodeship (east Poland)
- Jeżów, Jędrzejów County in Świętokrzyskie Voivodeship (south-central Poland)
- Jeżów, Końskie County in Świętokrzyskie Voivodeship (south-central Poland)
- Jeżów, Ostrowiec County in Świętokrzyskie Voivodeship (south-central Poland)
