= Sosnowiec, Świętokrzyskie Voivodeship =

Sosnowiec
- Village
- Location within Poland
- Coordinates: 50°35′22″N 20°3′32″E
- Country: Poland
- Voivodeship: Świętokrzyskie
- County: Jędrzejów
- Gmina: Sędziszów
- Population: 274

Sosnowiec (pronounced [sɔsˈnɔvjɛts]) is a village in the administrative district of Gmina Sędziszów, within Jędrzejów County, Świętokrzyskie Voivodeship, in south-central Poland. It lies approximately 1 km (1 mi) north-west of Sędziszów, 18 km (11 mi) west of Jędrzejów, and 52 km (32 mi) south-west of the regional capital Kielce.
