= Marianów, Jędrzejów County =

Marianów
- Village
- Location within Poland
- Coordinates: 50°34′55″N 20°1′23″E
- Country: Poland
- Voivodeship: Świętokrzyskie
- County: Jędrzejów
- Gmina: Sędziszów
- Population: 98

Marianów [maˈrjanuf] is a village in the administrative district of Gmina Sędziszów, within Jędrzejów County, Świętokrzyskie Voivodeship, in south-central Poland. It lies approximately 4 km (2 mi) west of Sędziszów, 21 km (13 mi) west of Jędrzejów, and 54 km (34 mi) south-west of the regional capital Kielce.
