= Piła, Jędrzejów County =

Piła
- Village
- Location within Poland
- Coordinates: 50°32′57″N 20°2′52″E
- Country: Poland
- Voivodeship: Świętokrzyskie
- County: Jędrzejów
- Gmina: Sędziszów
- Population: 146

Piła [ˈpiwa] is a village in the administrative district of Gmina Sędziszów, within Jędrzejów County, Świętokrzyskie Voivodeship, in south-central Poland. It lies approximately 5 km (3 mi) south of Sędziszów, 21 km (13 mi) south-west of Jędrzejów, and 55 km (34 mi) south-west of the regional capital Kielce.
