= Gniewięcin =

- Village
- Location within Poland
- Coordinates: 50°32′9″N 20°3′47″E
- Country: Poland
- Voivodeship: Świętokrzyskie
- County: Jędrzejów
- Gmina: Sędziszów
- Population: 513

Gniewięcin [ɡɲɛˈvjɛnt͡ɕin] is a village in the administrative district of Gmina Sędziszów, within Jędrzejów County, Świętokrzyskie Voivodeship, in south-central Poland. It lies approximately 6 km (4 mi) south of Sędziszów, 20 km (12 mi) south-west of Jędrzejów, and 55 km (34 mi) south-west of the regional capital Kielce.
