= Aleksandrów, Jędrzejów County =

Aleksandrów
- Village
- Location within Poland
- Coordinates: 50°34′34″N 20°9′21″E
- Country: Poland
- Voivodeship: Świętokrzyskie
- County: Jędrzejów
- Gmina: Sędziszów
- Population: 77

Aleksandrów [alɛkˈsandruf] is a village in the administrative district of Gmina Sędziszów, within Jędrzejów County, Świętokrzyskie Voivodeship, in south-central Poland. It lies approximately 7 km (4 mi) east of Sędziszów, 13 km (8 mi) south-west of Jędrzejów, and 48 km (30 mi) south-west of the regional capital Kielce.
