= Mstyczów =

- Village
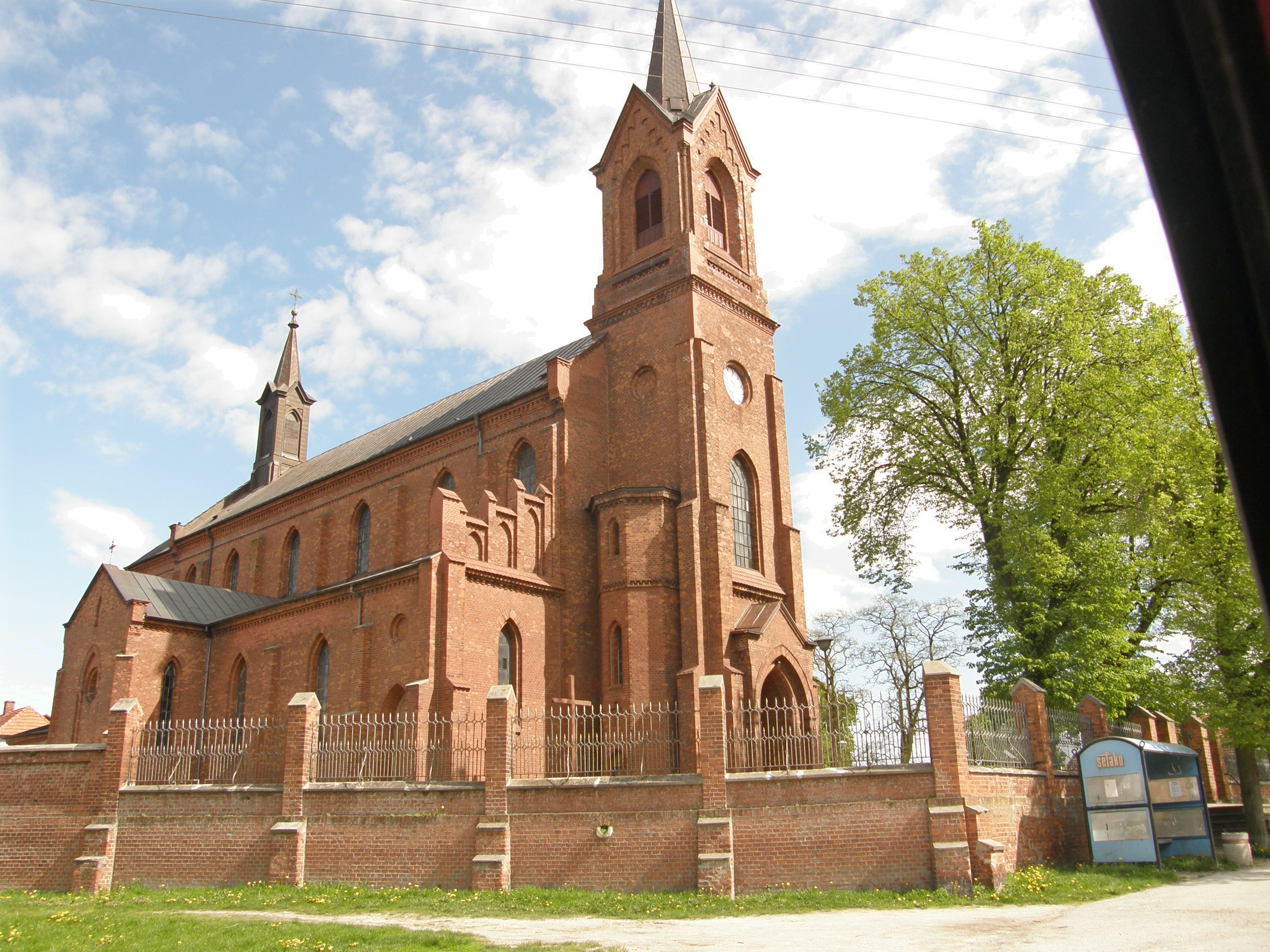
- Catholic church

- Location within Poland
- Coordinates: 50°31′30″N 19°58′31″E
- Country: Poland
- Voivodeship: Świętokrzyskie
- County: Jędrzejów
- Gmina: Sędziszów
- Population: 308

Mstyczów [ˈmstɨt͡ʂuf] is a village in the administrative district of Gmina Sędziszów, within Jędrzejów County, Świętokrzyskie Voivodeship, in south-central Poland. It lies approximately 10 km (6 mi) south-west of Sędziszów, 26 km (16 mi) south-west of Jędrzejów, and 61 km (38 mi) south-west of the regional capital Kielce.
