= Bugaj, Jędrzejów County =

Bugaj
- Village
- Location within Poland
- Coordinates: 50°34′10″N 19°58′10″E
- Country: Poland
- Voivodeship: Świętokrzyskie
- County: Jędrzejów
- Gmina: Sędziszów
- Population: 77

Bugaj [ˈbuɡai̯] is a village in the administrative district of Gmina Sędziszów, within Jędrzejów County, Świętokrzyskie Voivodeship, in south-central Poland. It lies approximately 8 km (5 mi) west of Sędziszów, 25 km (16 mi) west of Jędrzejów, and 58 km (36 mi) south-west of the regional capital Kielce.
