= Białowieża (disambiguation) =

Białowieża is a village in Podlaskie Voivodeship (eastern Poland).

Białowieża may also refer to:

- Białowieża Forest
- Białowieża Palace, tsars hunting lodge that was located in Tsarist Russia (currently the territory of north-central Poland)
- Białowieża, Nakło County in Kuyavian-Pomeranian Voivodeship (north-central Poland)
- Białowieża, Tuchola County in Kuyavian-Pomeranian Voivodeship (north-central Poland)
- Białowieża, Świętokrzyskie Voivodeship (south-central Poland)
- Białowieża, Masovian Voivodeship (east-central Poland)
- Białowieża, Opole Voivodeship (south-west Poland)
