= Klimontów, Jędrzejów County =

Klimontów
- Village
- Location within Poland
- Coordinates: 50°30′50″N 20°2′35″E
- Country: Poland
- Voivodeship: Świętokrzyskie
- County: Jędrzejów
- Gmina: Sędziszów
- Population: 374

Klimontów [kliˈmɔntuf] is a village in the administrative district of Gmina Sędziszów, within Jędrzejów County, Świętokrzyskie Voivodeship, in south-central Poland. It lies approximately 8 km (5 mi) south of Sędziszów, 23 km (14 mi) south-west of Jędrzejów, and 58 km (36 mi) south-west of the regional capital Kielce.
