= Mirosław Pawlak =

Polish politician

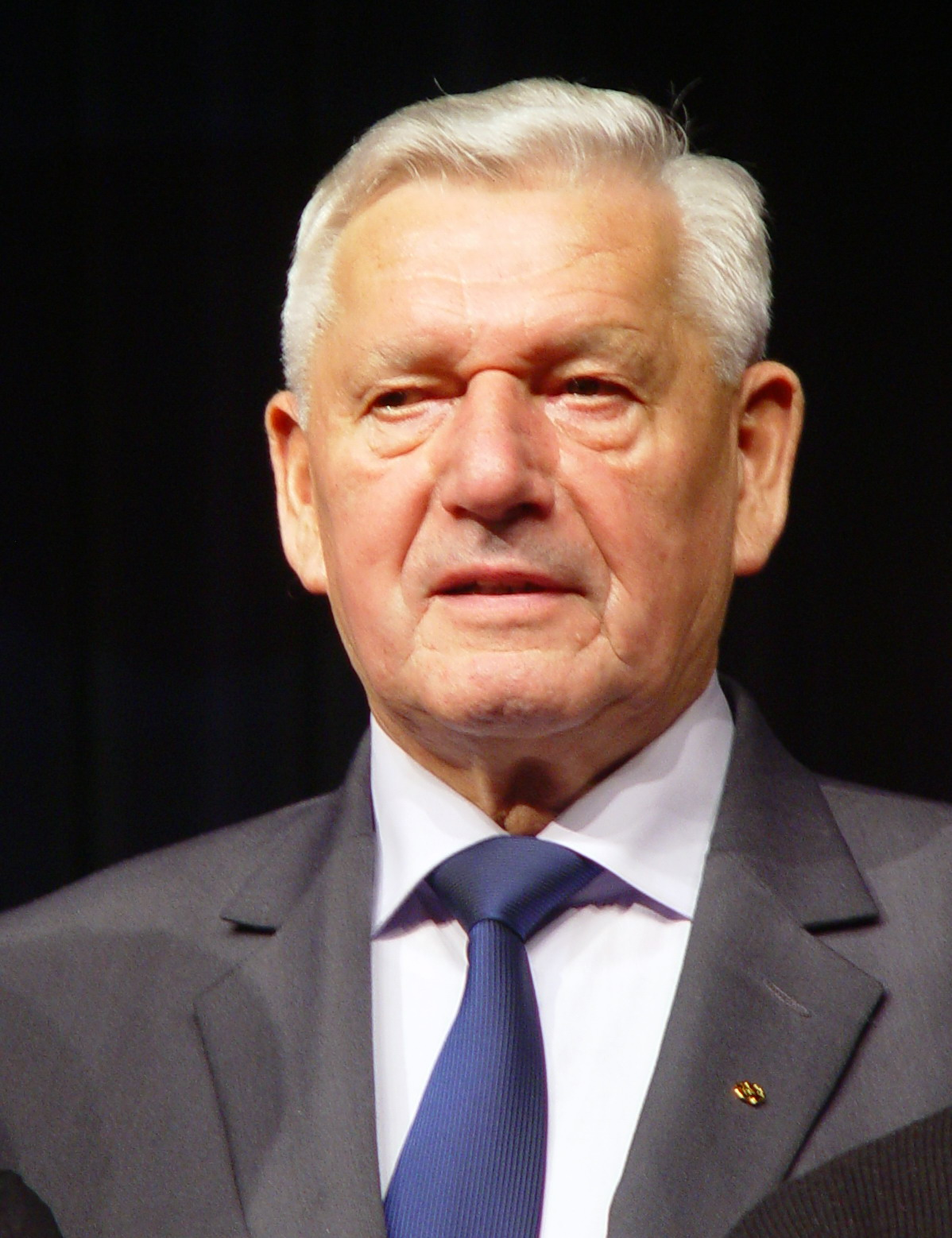
- =Mirosław Pawlak

Member of the Sejm
- Incumbent
- Assumed office 25 September 2005
- Constituency: 33 – Kielce

Personal details
- Born: 2 April 1942 (age 84)
- Party: Polish People's Party

Mirosław Antoni Pawlak (born 2 April 1942 in Zielonki, Jędrzejów County) is a Polish politician. He was elected to the Sejm on 25 September 2005, getting 6684 votes in 33 Kielce district as a candidate from the Polish People's Party list.

He was also a member of Sejm 1993-1997, Sejm 1997-2001, and Sejm 2001-2005.

== See also ==
- Members of Polish Sejm 2005-2007
