= Zagaje (Pawłowice) =

- Village
- Location within Poland
- Coordinates: 50°34′37″N 20°06′04″E
- Country: Poland
- Voivodeship: Świętokrzyskie
- County: Jędrzejów
- Gmina: Sędziszów
- Population: 65

Zagaje [zaˈɡajɛ] is a part of village Pawłowice in the administrative district of Gmina Sędziszów, within Jędrzejów County, Świętokrzyskie Voivodeship, in south-central Poland.
