= Podsadek =

- Village
- Location within Poland
- Coordinates: 50°31′19″N 20°0′9″E
- Country: Poland
- Voivodeship: Świętokrzyskie
- County: Jędrzejów
- Gmina: Sędziszów
- Population: 205

Podsadek [pɔtˈsadɛk] is a village in the administrative district of Gmina Sędziszów, within Jędrzejów County, Świętokrzyskie Voivodeship, in south-central Poland. It lies approximately 9 km (6 mi) south-west of Sędziszów, 25 km (16 mi) south-west of Jędrzejów, and 60 km (37 mi) south-west of the regional capital Kielce.
