= Czekaj =

Czekaj may refer to the following places:

- Czekaj, Łódź Voivodeship (central Poland)
- Czekaj, Subcarpathian Voivodeship (south-east Poland)
- Czekaj, Świętokrzyskie Voivodeship (south-central Poland)
- Czekaj, Żyrardów County in Masovian Voivodeship (east-central Poland)
