= Słaboszowice =

- Village
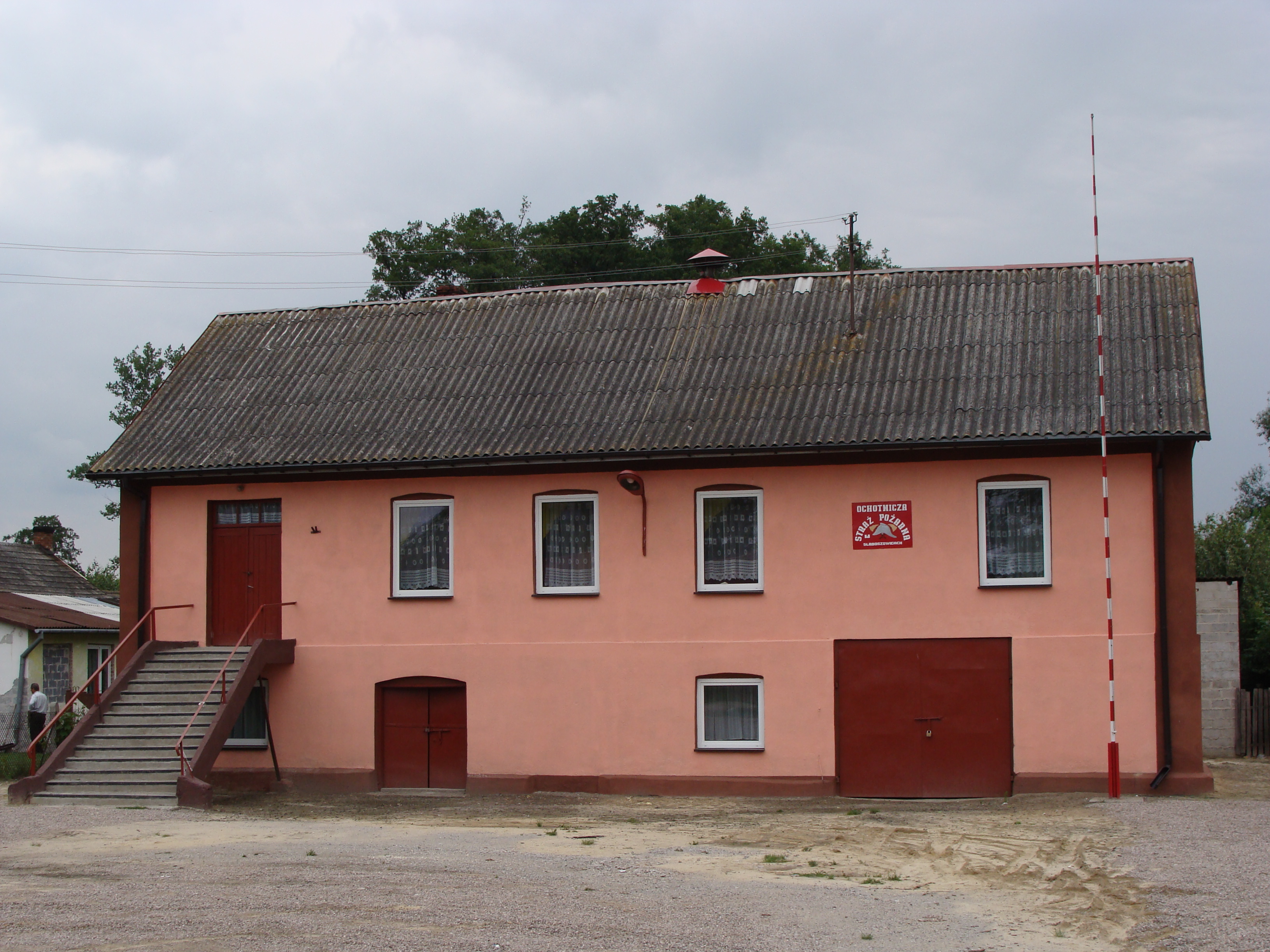

- Location within Poland
- Coordinates: 50°35′2″N 20°11′34″E
- Country: Poland
- Voivodeship: Świętokrzyskie
- County: Jędrzejów
- Gmina: Sędziszów
- Population: 150

Słaboszowice [swabɔʂɔˈvit͡sɛ] is a village in the administrative district of Gmina Sędziszów, within Jędrzejów County, Świętokrzyskie Voivodeship, in south-central Poland. It lies approximately 9 km (6 mi) east of Sędziszów, 10 km (6 mi) south-west of Jędrzejów, and 45 km (28 mi) south-west of the regional capital Kielce.
