= Tarnawa, Świętokrzyskie Voivodeship =

Tarnawa
- Village
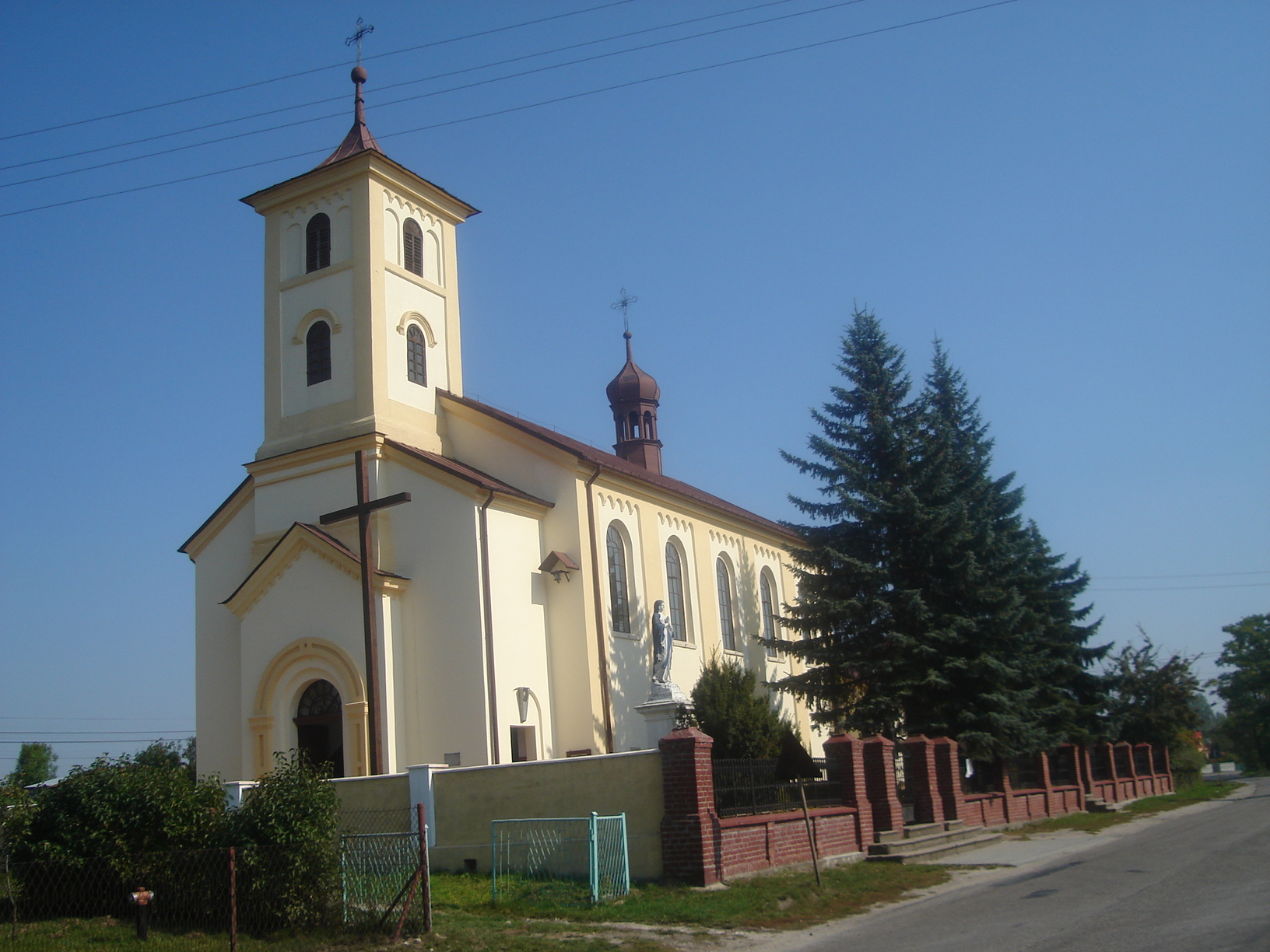
- Catholic church

- Location within Poland
- Coordinates: 50°34′13″N 20°0′49″E
- Country: Poland
- Voivodeship: Świętokrzyskie
- County: Jędrzejów
- Gmina: Sędziszów
- Population: 411

Tarnawa [tarˈnava] is a village in the administrative district of Gmina Sędziszów, within Jędrzejów County, Świętokrzyskie Voivodeship, in south-central Poland. It lies approximately 5 km (3 mi) west of Sędziszów, 22 km (14 mi) west of Jędrzejów, and 55 km (34 mi) south-west of the regional capital Kielce.

Tarnawa is in the Central European Time Zone which is GMT+1.
