= Przełaj Czepiecki =

- Village
- Location within Poland
- Coordinates: 50°32′25″N 19°54′58″E
- Country: Poland
- Voivodeship: Świętokrzyskie
- County: Jędrzejów
- Gmina: Sędziszów
- Population: 120

Przełaj Czepiecki [ˈpʂɛwai̯ t͡ʂɛˈpjɛt͡ski] is a village in the administrative district of Gmina Sędziszów, within Jędrzejów County, Świętokrzyskie Voivodeship, in south-central Poland. It lies approximately 12 km (7 mi) south-west of Sędziszów, 30 km (19 mi) west of Jędrzejów, and 63 km (39 mi) south-west of the regional capital Kielce.
