= Boleścice =

- Village
- Location within Poland
- Coordinates: 50°35′16″N 20°6′39″E
- Country: Poland
- Voivodeship: Świętokrzyskie
- County: Jędrzejów
- Gmina: Sędziszów
- Population: 370

Boleścice [bɔlɛɕˈt͡ɕit͡sɛ] is a village in the administrative district of Gmina Sędziszów, within Jędrzejów County, Świętokrzyskie Voivodeship, in south-central Poland. It lies approximately 4 km (2 mi) east of Sędziszów, 15 km (9 mi) west of Jędrzejów, and 49 km (30 mi) south-west of the regional capital Kielce.
