= Szałas, Jędrzejów County =

Szałas
- Village
- Location within Poland
- Coordinates: 50°34′26″N 19°59′22″E
- Country: Poland
- Voivodeship: Świętokrzyskie
- County: Jędrzejów
- Gmina: Sędziszów
- Population: 119

Szałas [ˈʂawas] is a village in the administrative district of Gmina Sędziszów, within Jędrzejów County, Świętokrzyskie Voivodeship, in south-central Poland. It lies approximately 6 km (4 mi) west of Sędziszów, 23 km (14 mi) west of Jędrzejów, and 56 km (35 mi) south-west of the regional capital Kielce.
