= Swaryszów =

- Village
- Location within Poland
- Coordinates: 50°33′33″N 20°0′54″E
- Country: Poland
- Voivodeship: Świętokrzyskie
- County: Jędrzejów
- Gmina: Sędziszów
- Population: 210

Swaryszów [sfaˈrɨʂuf] is a village in the administrative district of Gmina Sędziszów, within Jędrzejów County, Świętokrzyskie Voivodeship, in south-central Poland. It lies approximately 5 km (3 mi) south-west of Sędziszów, 22 km (14 mi) west of Jędrzejów, and 56 km (35 mi) south-west of the regional capital Kielce.
