= Przełaj =

- Village
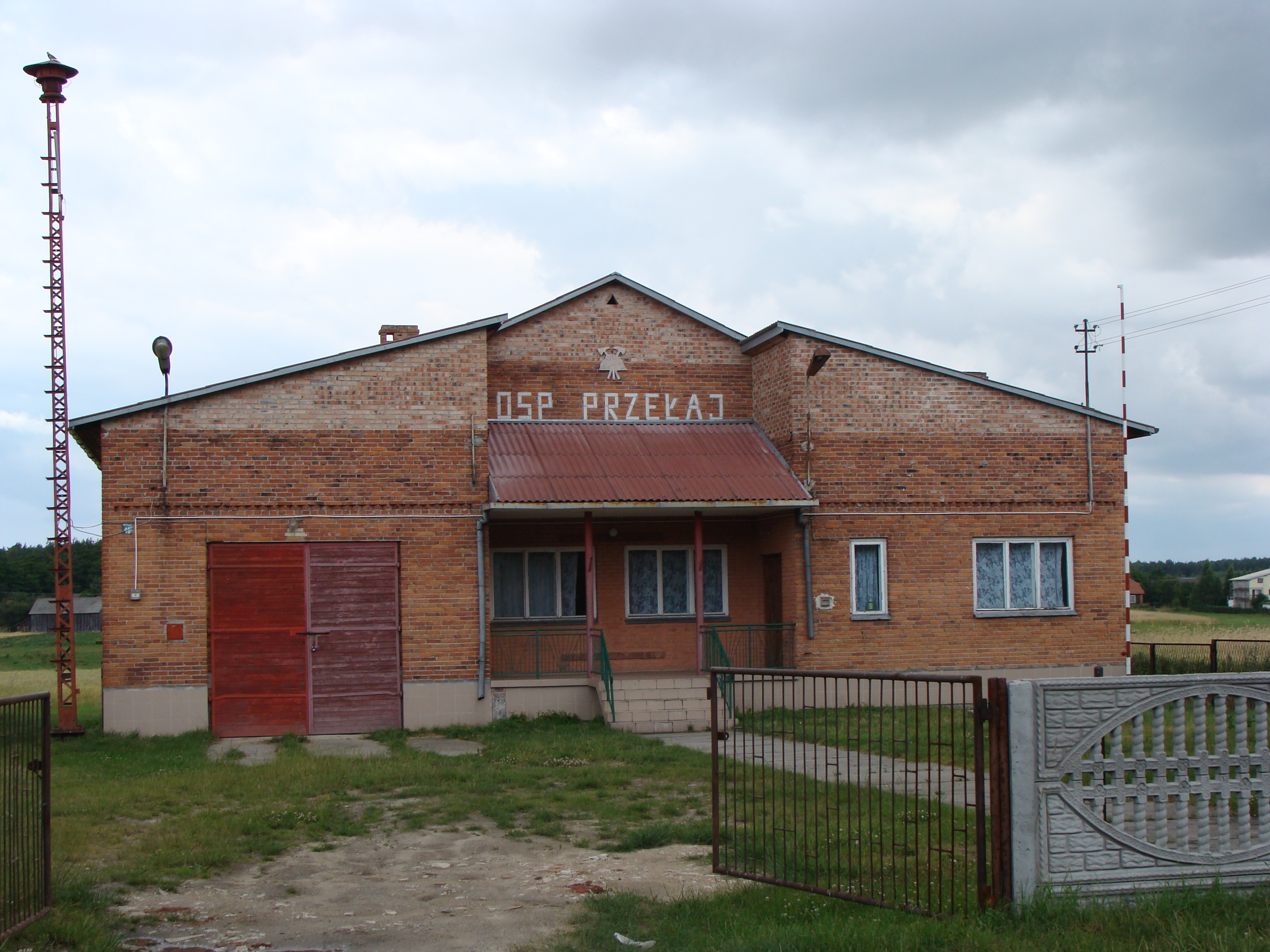
- Fire station

- Location within Poland
- Coordinates: 50°31′25″N 19°56′17″E
- Country: Poland
- Voivodeship: Świętokrzyskie
- County: Jędrzejów
- Gmina: Sędziszów
- Population: 290

Przełaj [ˈpʂɛwai̯] is a village in the administrative district of Gmina Sędziszów, within Jędrzejów County, Świętokrzyskie Voivodeship, in south-central Poland. It lies approximately 12 km (7 mi) south-west of Sędziszów, 29 km (18 mi) south-west of Jędrzejów, and 63 km (39 mi) south-west of the regional capital Kielce.
