= Klimontówek =

- Village
- Location within Poland
- Coordinates: 50°30′53″N 20°3′18″E
- Country: Poland
- Voivodeship: Świętokrzyskie
- County: Jędrzejów
- Gmina: Sędziszów
- Population: 117

Klimontówek [klimɔnˈtuvɛk] is a village in the administrative district of Gmina Sędziszów, within Jędrzejów County, Świętokrzyskie Voivodeship, in south-central Poland. It lies approximately 8 km (5 mi) south of Sędziszów, 22 km (14 mi) south-west of Jędrzejów, and 57 km (35 mi) south-west of the regional capital Kielce.
