= Mierzyn =

Mierzyn may refer to the following places:

- Mierzyn, Greater Poland Voivodeship (west-central Poland)
- Mierzyn, Łódź Voivodeship (central Poland)
- Mierzyn, Świętokrzyskie Voivodeship (south-central Poland)
- Mierzyn, Warmian-Masurian Voivodeship (north Poland)
- Mierzyn, Białogard County in West Pomeranian Voivodeship (north-west Poland)
- Mierzyn, Gryfice County in West Pomeranian Voivodeship (north-west Poland)
- Mierzyn, Police County in West Pomeranian Voivodeship (north-west Poland)
