= Wojciechowice =

Wojciechowice may refer to the following places in Poland:

- Wojciechowice, Lower Silesian Voivodeship (south-west Poland)
- Wojciechowice, Jędrzejów County in Świętokrzyskie Voivodeship (south-central Poland)
- Wojciechowice, Opatów County in Świętokrzyskie Voivodeship (south-central Poland)
- Wojciechowice, Ostrowiec County in Świętokrzyskie Voivodeship (south-central Poland)
- Wojciechowice, Masovian Voivodeship (east-central Poland)
