= Grązów =

- Village
- Location within Poland
- Coordinates: 50°33′23″N 20°6′10″E
- Country: Poland
- Voivodeship: Świętokrzyskie
- County: Jędrzejów
- Gmina: Sędziszów
- Population: 58

Grązów [ˈɡrɔ̃zuf] is a village in the administrative district of Gmina Sędziszów, within Jędrzejów County, Świętokrzyskie Voivodeship, in south-central Poland. It lies approximately 4 km (2 mi) south-east of Sędziszów, 17 km (11 mi) south-west of Jędrzejów, and 52 km (32 mi) south-west of the regional capital Kielce.
