= Krzelów =

Krzelów may refer to the following places in Poland:

- Krzelów, Lower Silesian Voivodeship (south-west Poland)
- Krzelów, Świętokrzyskie Voivodeship (south-central Poland)
