= Czepiec =

Czepiec may refer to:

- Czepiec, West Pomeranian Voivodeship, village in the administrative district of Gmina Wałcz, Wałcz County
- Czepiec, Świętokrzyskie Voivodeship, village in the administrative district of Gmina Sędziszów, Jędrzejów County
