= Borszowice, Gmina Sędziszów =

Borszowice
- Village
- Location within Poland
- Coordinates: 50°34′30″N 20°5′1″E
- Country: Poland
- Voivodeship: Świętokrzyskie
- County: Jędrzejów
- Gmina: Sędziszów
- Population: 238

Borszowice [bɔrʂɔˈvit͡sɛ] is a village in the administrative district of Gmina Sędziszów, within Jędrzejów County, Świętokrzyskie Voivodeship, in south-central Poland. It lies approximately 2 km (1 mi) south-east of Sędziszów, 17 km (11 mi) south-west of Jędrzejów, and 51 km (32 mi) south-west of the regional capital Kielce.
