= Krzcięcice =

- Village
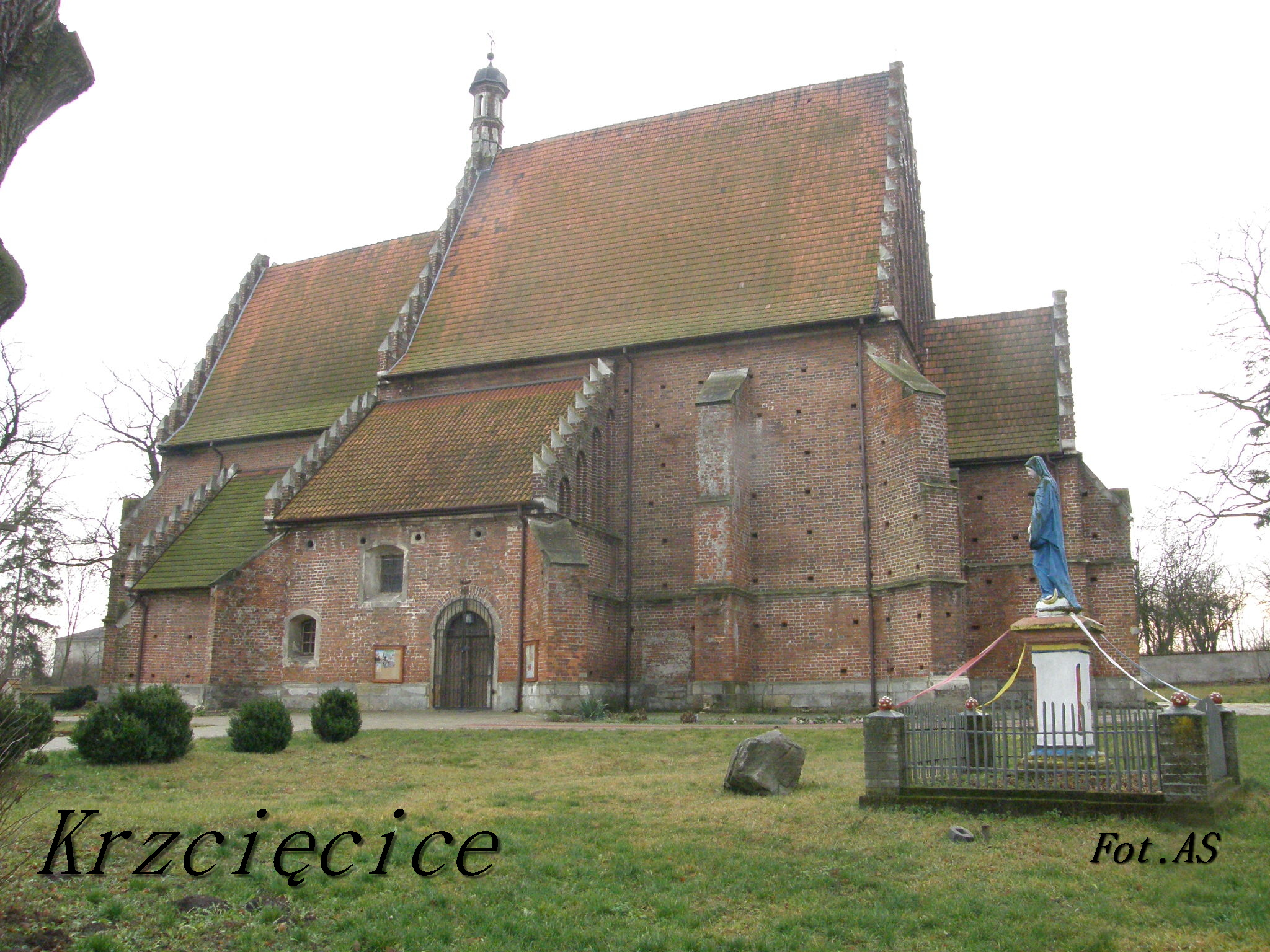
- Catholic church

- Location within Poland
- Coordinates: 50°35′7″N 20°10′42″E
- Country: Poland
- Voivodeship: Świętokrzyskie
- County: Jędrzejów
- Gmina: Sędziszów

Population
  - Total: 210

Krzcięcice [kʂt͡ɕɛnˈt͡ɕit͡sɛ] is a village in the administrative district of Gmina Sędziszów, within Jędrzejów County, Świętokrzyskie Voivodeship, in south-central Poland. It lies approximately 8 km (5 mi) east of Sędziszów, 11 km (7 mi) south-west of Jędrzejów, and 46 km (29 mi) south-west of the regional capital Kielce.

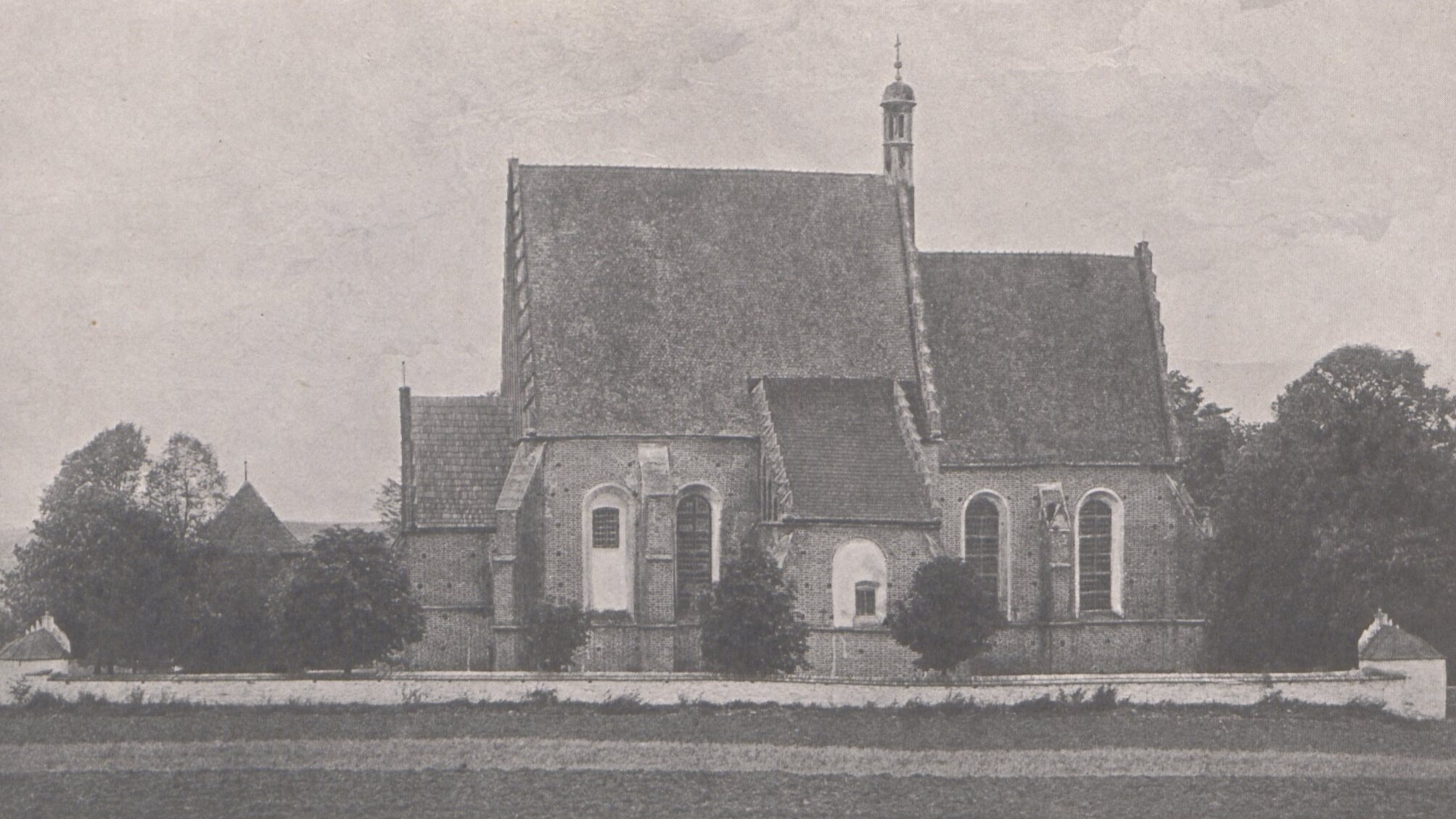
Saint Procopius church, ca 1913
