= Czekaj, Świętokrzyskie Voivodeship =

Czekaj
- Village
- Location within Poland
- Coordinates: 50°33′26″N 19°58′31″E
- Country: Poland
- Voivodeship: Świętokrzyskie
- County: Jędrzejów
- Gmina: Sędziszów

Czekaj [ˈt͡ʂɛkai̯] is a village in the administrative district of Gmina Sędziszów, within Jędrzejów County, Świętokrzyskie Voivodeship, in south-central Poland. It lies approximately 8 km (5 mi) south-west of Sędziszów, 25 km (16 mi) west of Jędrzejów, and 58 km (36 mi) south-west of the regional capital Kielce.
