= Pawłowice, Jędrzejów County =

Pawłowice
- Village
- Location within Poland
- Coordinates: 50°34′57″N 20°5′32″E
- Country: Poland
- Voivodeship: Świętokrzyskie
- County: Jędrzejów
- Gmina: Sędziszów
- Population: 370

Pawłowice [pavwɔˈvit͡sɛ] is a village in the administrative district of Gmina Sędziszów, within Jędrzejów County, Świętokrzyskie Voivodeship, in south-central Poland. It lies approximately 2 km (1 mi) east of Sędziszów, 16 km (10 mi) west of Jędrzejów, and 50 km (31 mi) south-west of the regional capital Kielce.
