= Wojciechowice, Jędrzejów County =

Wojciechowice
- Village
- Location within Poland
- Coordinates: 50°35′38″N 20°8′24″E
- Country: Poland
- Voivodeship: Świętokrzyskie
- County: Jędrzejów
- Gmina: Sędziszów
- Population: 110

Wojciechowice (Polish pronunciation: [vɔjt͡ɕɛxɔˈvit͡sɛ]) is a village in the administrative district of Gmina Sędziszów, within Jędrzejów County, Świętokrzyskie Voivodeship, in south-central Poland. It lies approximately 6 km (4 mi) east of Sędziszów, 13 km (8 mi) west of Jędrzejów, and 47 km (29 mi) south-west of the regional capital Kielce.
