= Mierzyn, Świętokrzyskie Voivodeship =

Mierzyn
- Village
- Location within Poland
- Coordinates: 50°35′6″N 20°8′58″E
- Country: Poland
- Voivodeship: Świętokrzyskie
- County: Jędrzejów
- Gmina: Sędziszów
- Population: 286

Mierzyn [ˈmjɛʐɨn] is a village in the administrative district of Gmina Sędziszów, within Jędrzejów County, Świętokrzyskie Voivodeship, in south-central Poland. It lies approximately 6 km (4 mi) east of Sędziszów, 12 km (7 mi) south-west of Jędrzejów, and 47 km (29 mi) south-west of the regional capital Kielce.
