= Gmina Sędziszów =

Gmina Sędziszów Sędziszów Commune
- Gmina
- Coat of arms

- Location within Poland
- Coordinates (Sędziszów): 50°35′N 20°4′E
- Country: Poland
- Voivodeship: Świętokrzyskie
- County: Jędrzejów
- Seat: Sędziszów

Area
  - Total: 145.71 km^{2} (56.26 sq mi)

Population (2006)
  - Total: 13,116
  - Density: 90.014/km^{2} (233.14/sq mi)
  - Urban: 6,813
  - Rural: 6,303
- Postal code: 28-340
- Car plates: TJE
- Website: http://www.sedziszow.pl

Gmina Sędziszów is an urban-rural gmina (administrative district) in Jędrzejów County, Świętokrzyskie Voivodeship, in south-central Poland. Its seat is the town of Sędziszów, which lies approximately 18 kilometres (11 mi) west of Jędrzejów and 52 km (32 mi) south-west of the regional capital Kielce.

The gmina covers an area of 145.71 square kilometres (56.3 sq mi), and as of 2006 its total population is 13,116 (out of which the population of Sędziszów amounts to 6,813, and the population of the rural part of the gmina is 6,303).

== Villages ==
Apart from the town of Sędziszów, Gmina Sędziszów contains the villages and settlements of Aleksandrów, Białowieża, Boleścice, Borszowice, Bugaj, Czekaj, Czepiec, Gniewięcin, Grązów, Jeżów, Klimontów, Klimontówek, Krzcięcice, Krzelów, Łowinia, Marianów, Mierzyn, Mstyczów, Pawłowice, Pawłowice-Zagaje, Piła, Piołunka, Podsadek, Przełaj, Przełaj Czepiecki, Słaboszowice, Sosnowiec, Swaryszów, Szałas, Tarnawa, Wojciechowice, Wydanka and Zielonki.

== Neighbouring gminas ==
Gmina Sędziszów is bordered by the gminas of Jędrzejów, Kozłów, Nagłowice, Słupia, Wodzisław and Żarnowiec.
