= Zielonki, Jędrzejów County =

Zielonki
- Village
- Location within Poland
- Coordinates: 50°32′50″N 20°7′40″E
- Country: Poland
- Voivodeship: Świętokrzyskie
- County: Jędrzejów
- Gmina: Sędziszów
- Population: 339

Zielonki [ʑɛˈlɔŋki] is a village in the administrative district of Gmina Sędziszów, within Jędrzejów County, Świętokrzyskie Voivodeship, in south-central Poland. It lies approximately 6 km (4 mi) south-east of Sędziszów, 16 km (10 mi) south-west of Jędrzejów, and 51 km (32 mi) south-west of the regional capital Kielce.
