= Wydanka =

- Village
- Location within Poland
- Coordinates: 50°33′56″N 19°59′54″E
- Country: Poland
- Voivodeship: Świętokrzyskie
- County: Jędrzejów
- Gmina: Sędziszów

Wydanka [vɨˈdaŋka] is a village in the administrative district of Gmina Sędziszów, within Jędrzejów County, Świętokrzyskie Voivodeship, in south-central Poland.
