= Krzelów, Świętokrzyskie Voivodeship =

Krzelów
- Village
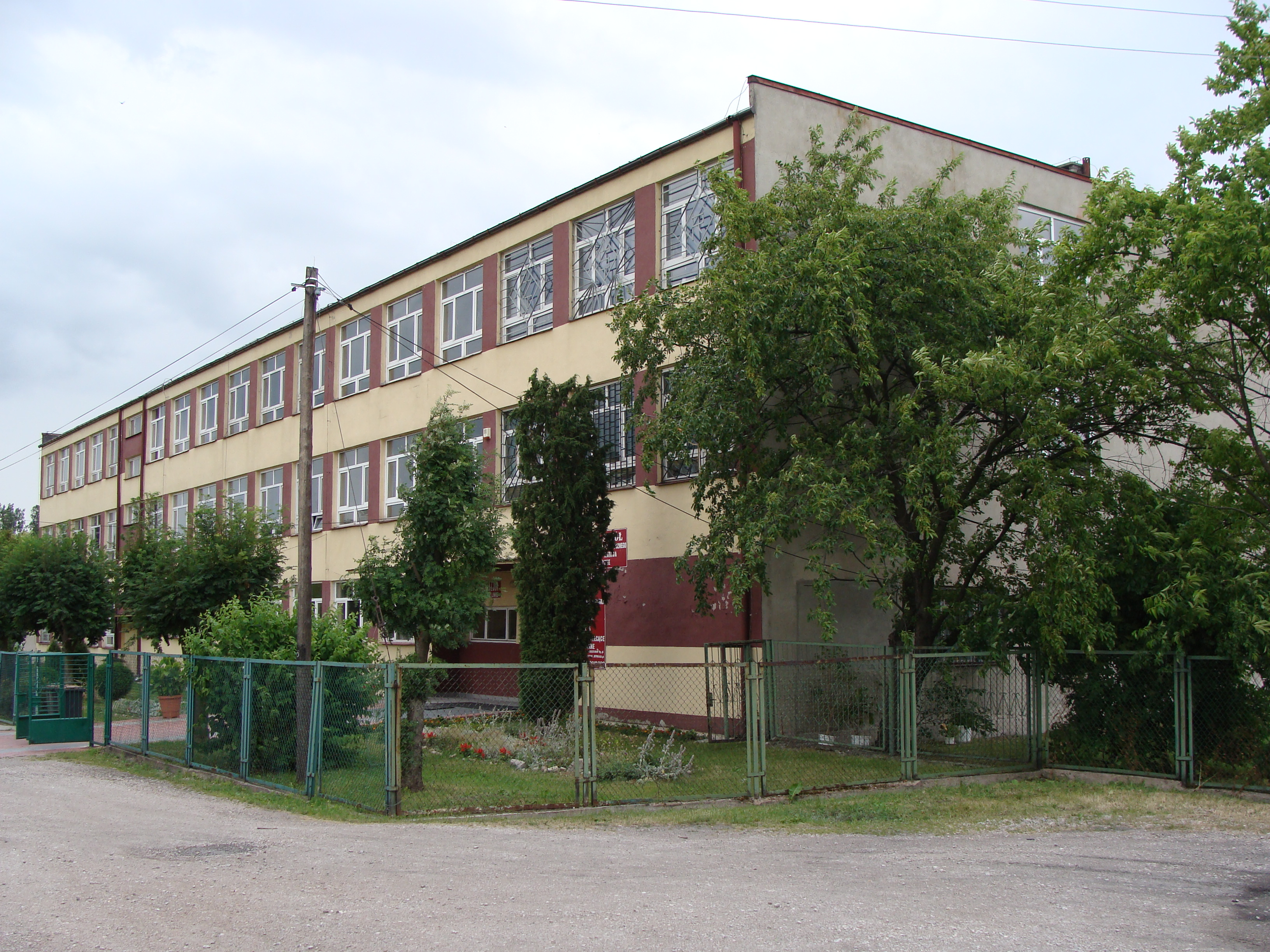
- School

- Location within Poland
- Coordinates: 50°33′21″N 19°59′26″E
- Country: Poland
- Voivodeship: Świętokrzyskie
- County: Jędrzejów
- Gmina: Sędziszów

Krzelów [ˈkʂɛluf] is a village in the administrative district of Gmina Sędziszów, within Jędrzejów County, Świętokrzyskie Voivodeship, in south-central Poland. It lies approximately 7 km (4 mi) south-west of Sędziszów, 24 km (15 mi) west of Jędrzejów, and 58 km (36 mi) south-west of the regional capital Kielce.
