= Nagorzyce =

- Village
- Location within Poland
- Coordinates: 50°51′0″N 21°13′0″E
- Country: Poland
- Voivodeship: Świętokrzyskie
- County: Ostrowiec
- Gmina: Waśniów

Nagorzyce [naɡɔˈʐɨt͡sɛ] is a village in the administrative district of Gmina Waśniów, within Ostrowiec County, Świętokrzyskie Voivodeship, in south-central Poland. It lies approximately 6 km (4 mi) south of Waśniów, 16 km (10 mi) south-west of Ostrowiec Świętokrzyski, and 43 km (27 mi) east of the regional capital Kielce.
