= Grabownica, Świętokrzyskie Voivodeship =

Grabownica
- Village
- Location within Poland
- Coordinates: 50°54′55″N 20°15′29″E
- Country: Poland
- Voivodeship: Świętokrzyskie
- County: Kielce
- Gmina: Łopuszno
- Population: 202

Grabownica [ɡrabɔvˈnit͡sa] is a village in the administrative district of Gmina Łopuszno, within Kielce County, Świętokrzyskie Voivodeship, in south-central Poland. It lies approximately 4 km (2 mi) south of Łopuszno and 26 km (16 mi) west of the regional capital Kielce.
