= Jeżów, Jędrzejów County =

Jeżów
- Village
- Location within Poland
- Coordinates: 50°31′13″N 20°1′8″E
- Country: Poland
- Voivodeship: Świętokrzyskie
- County: Jędrzejów
- Gmina: Sędziszów
- Population: 208

Jeżów [ˈjɛʐuf] is a village in the administrative district of Gmina Sędziszów, within Jędrzejów County, Świętokrzyskie Voivodeship, in south-central Poland. It lies approximately 8 km (5 mi) south-west of Sędziszów, 24 km (15 mi) south-west of Jędrzejów, and 59 km (37 mi) south-west of the regional capital Kielce.
