= Roztylice =

- Village
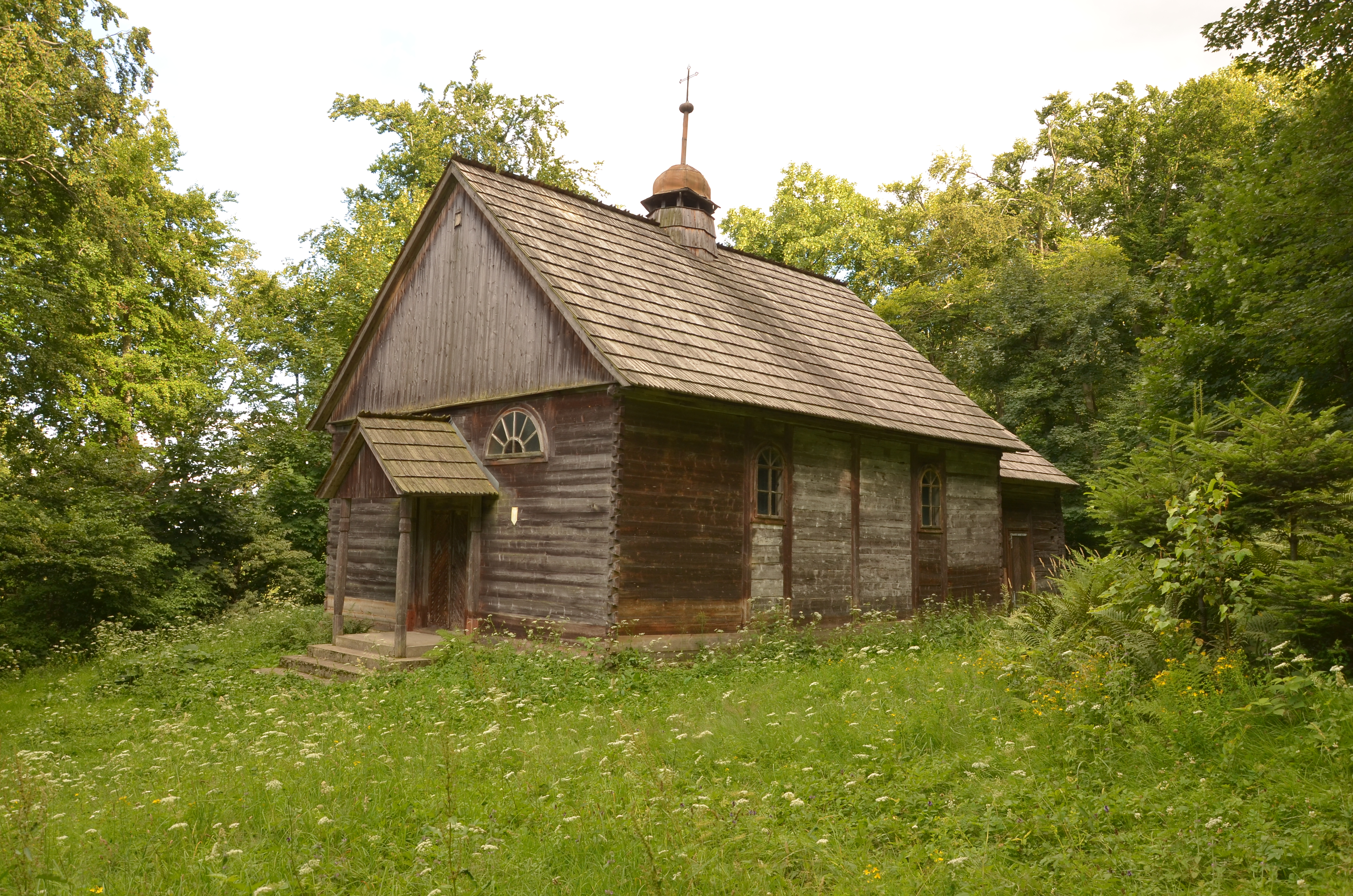
- Chapel

- Location within Poland
- Coordinates: 50°50′25″N 21°12′59″E
- Country: Poland
- Voivodeship: Świętokrzyskie
- County: Ostrowiec
- Gmina: Waśniów
- Population: 370

Roztylice [rɔstɨˈlit͡sɛ] is a village in the administrative district of Gmina Waśniów, within Ostrowiec County, Świętokrzyskie Voivodeship, in south-central Poland. It lies approximately 7 km (4 mi) south of Waśniów, 17 km (11 mi) south-west of Ostrowiec Świętokrzyski, and 43 km (27 mi) east of the regional capital Kielce.
