= Jeżów, Jawor County =

Jeżów
- Settlement
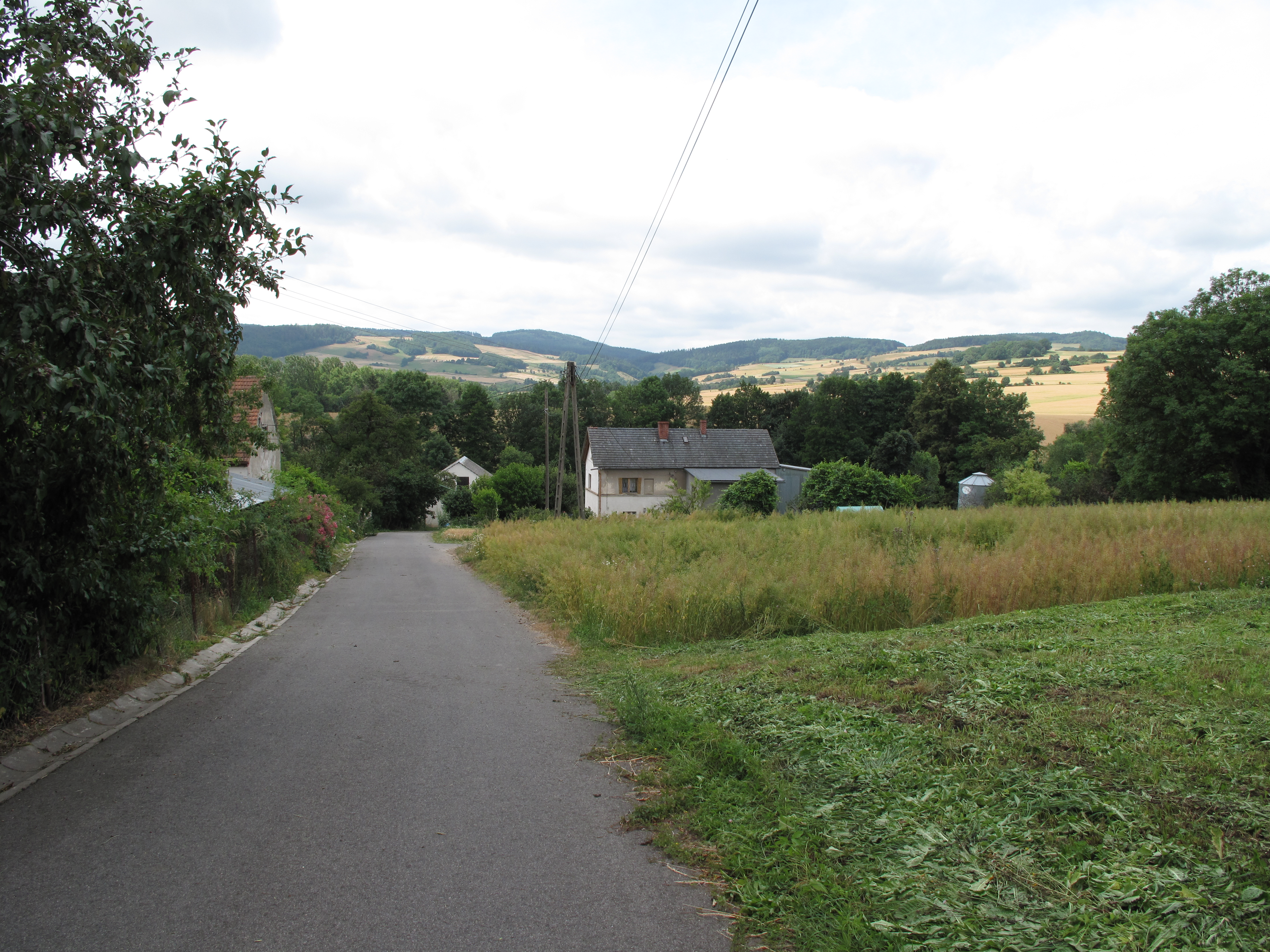
- Houses of the settlement

- Location within Poland
- Coordinates: 50°56′N 16°3′E
- Country: Poland
- Voivodeship: Lower Silesian
- County: Jawor
- Gmina: Bolków

Jeżów is a settlement in Gmina Bolków, Jawor County, Lower Silesian Voivodeship, in south-western Poland.

From 1975 to 1998 the village was in Jelenia Góra Voivodeship.

== Gallery ==
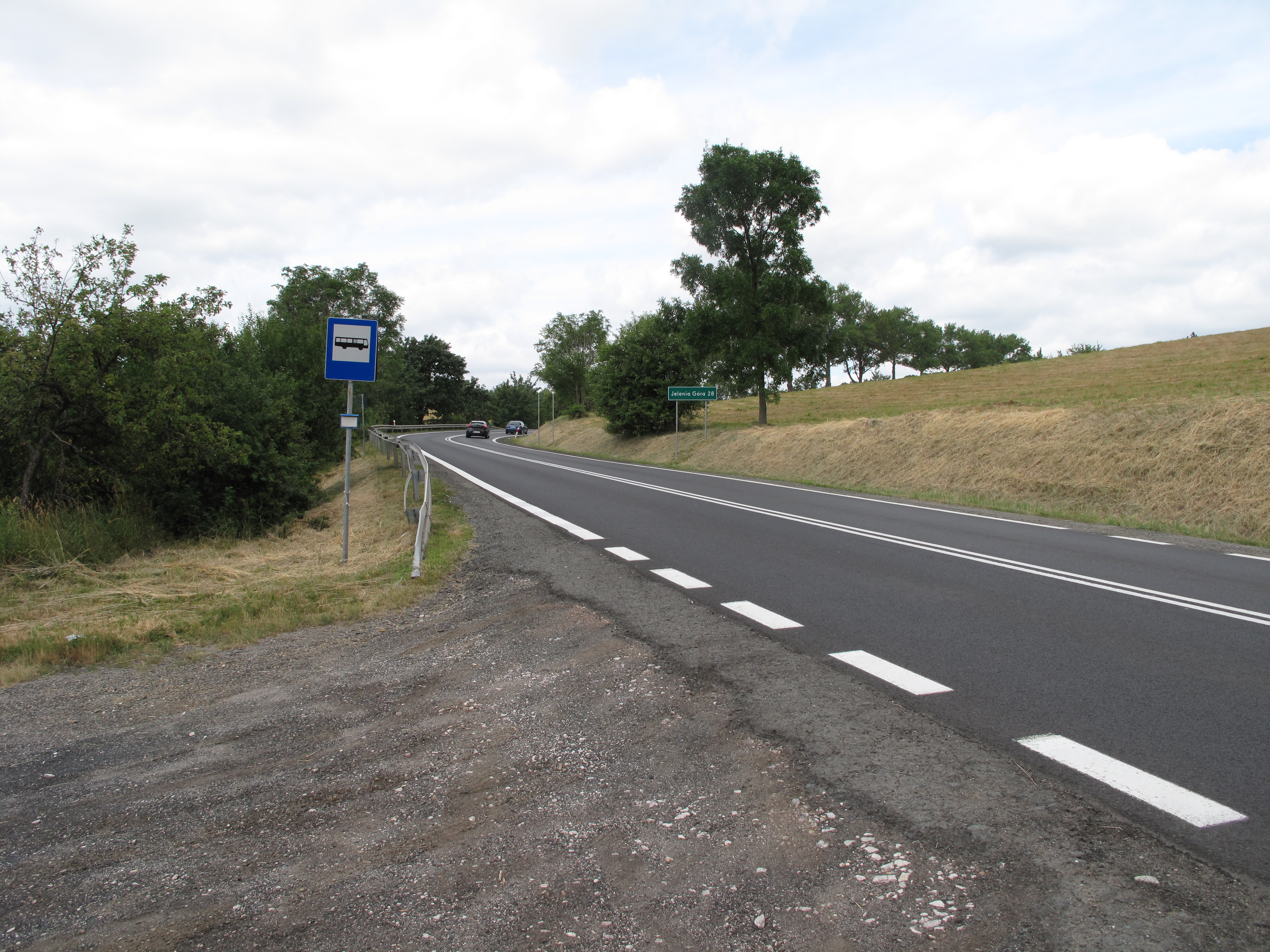
Main road by the settlement

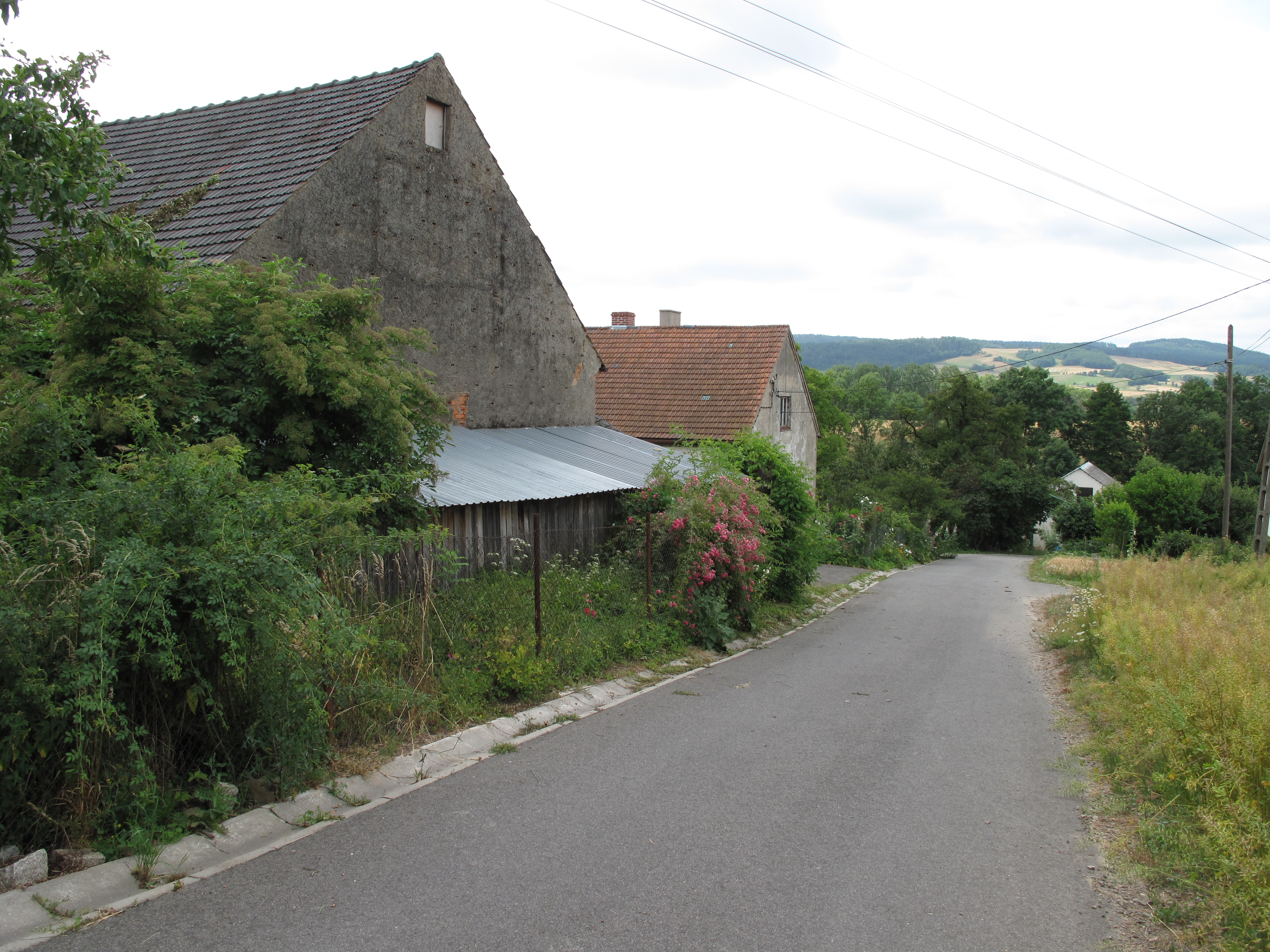
Houses by the road

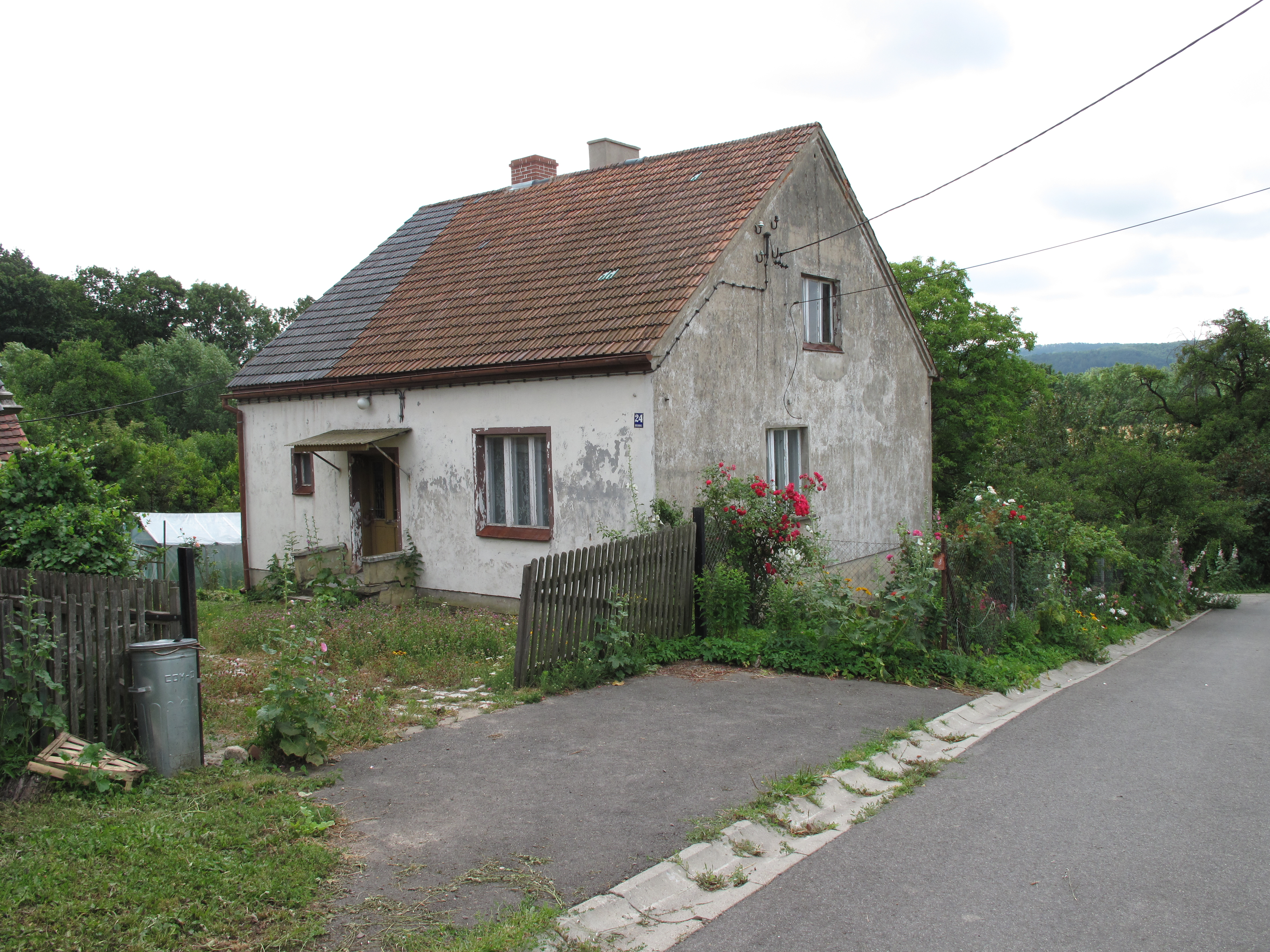
House

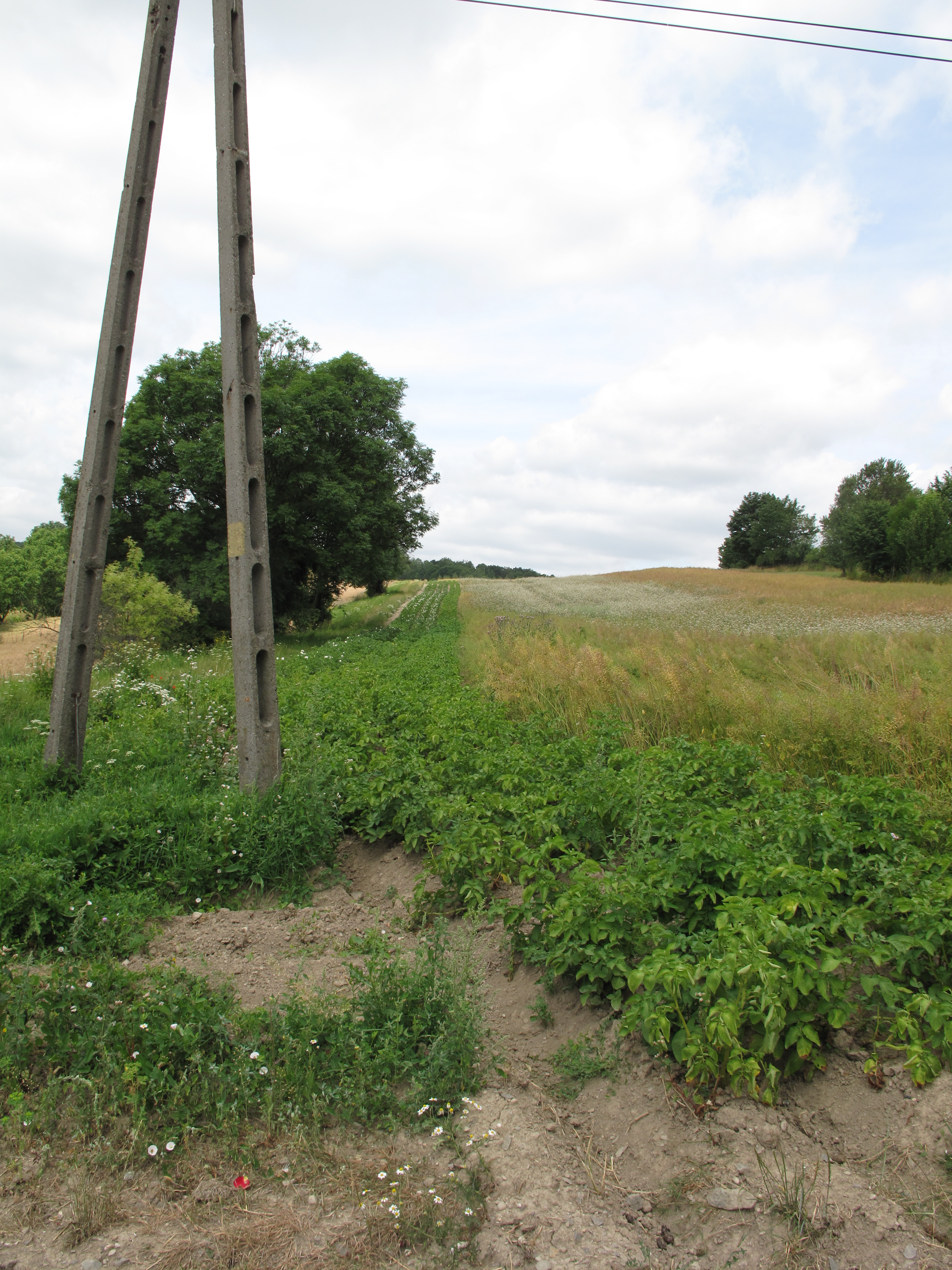
Fields
