= Sędziszów =

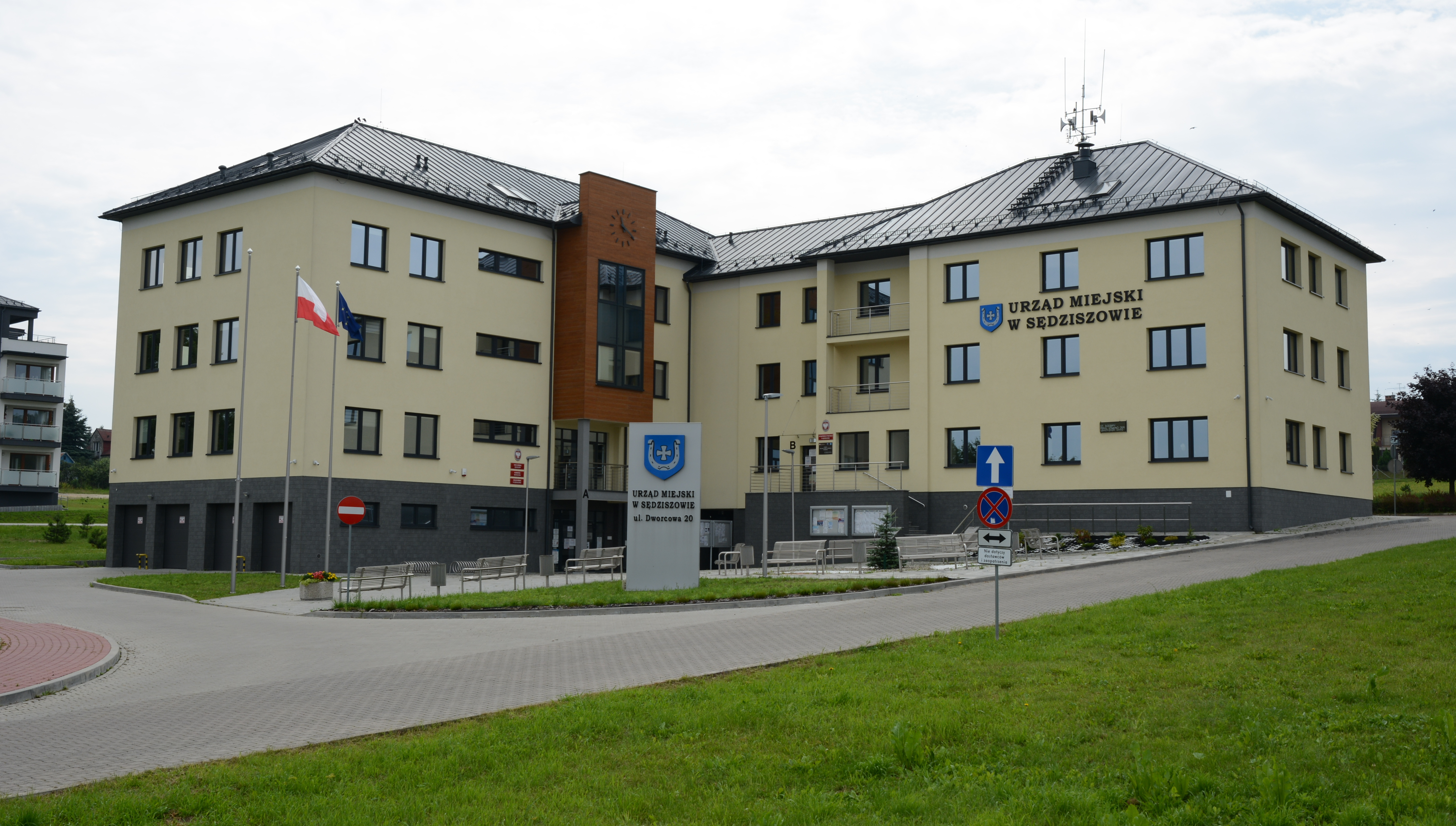
- Municipal Office

- Coat of arms

- Location within Poland
- Coordinates: 50°35′N 20°4′E
- Country: Poland
- Voivodeship: Świętokrzyskie
- County: Jędrzejów
- Gmina: Sędziszów

Area
  - Total: 7.97 km^{2} (3.08 sq mi)

Population (2009)
  - Total: 6,639
  - Density: 833/km^{2} (2,160/sq mi)
- Time zone: UTC+1 (CET)
  - Summer (DST): UTC+2 (CEST)
- Postal code: 28-340
- Area code: +48 41
- Car plates: TJE
- Website: http://www.sedziszow.pl/

Sędziszów [sɛɲˈd͡ʑiʂuf] is a town in Jędrzejów County, Świętokrzyskie Voivodeship, in southern Poland, with 6,639 inhabitants (2009). The town belongs to Lesser Poland.

== Transport ==
Sędziszów railway station is a stop for both the PKP intercity trains and their regional trains. The Broad Gauge Metallurgy Line also goes through Sędziszów, and the town lies eight kilometres (5.0 miles) from European route E77.

== History ==
Sędziszów is a historic seat of the noble Jastrzębiec family (see Jastrzębiec coat of arms), and its history dates back to the 13th century. Within the Kingdom of Poland, it was administratively located in the Kraków Voivodeship in the Lesser Poland Province. Until World War II, Sędziszów was a private village, its last owners were the Kamiński family. In the 15th century, it had a wooden church of St. Peter and Paul. The church burned in a fire, and a new, brick one was built in 1771.

After the Partitions of Poland, since 1815, the village was located in Russian-controlled Congress Poland. During the January Uprising, on January 31, 1864, Russian Cossacks attacked a small unit of Polish insurgents near the village. After a skirmish in which there were several casualties on both sides, the insurgents managed to escape the Russians. The Russians then entered Sędziszów and murdered the defenseless heirs of the village from the Rusocki noble family.

In 1885 Sędziszów received a rail station, along a line from Warsaw to Sosnowiec (in the 1920s, a connection to Kraków via Miechów was added). After that, the center of the village gradually moved from its ancient market square towards the station, and Sędziszów emerged as a settlement for rail workers, with new houses and a roundhouse. In 1918, Poland regained independence and control of Sędziszów.

Following the German-Soviet invasion of Poland, which started World War II in September 1939, Sędziszów was occupied by Germany. In 1940, German occupiers expanded the station and the Sędziszów rail hub. The town was a center of Polish resistance, with Home Army units operating here. The occupiers established and operated a sizeable forced labour camp for Jews in Sędziszów. During the Warsaw Uprising, in September 1944, the Germans deported 100 Poles (mainly old people, ill people and women with children) from the Dulag 121 camp in Pruszków, where they were initially imprisoned, to Sędziszów.

Until February 14, 1990, Sędziszów was a village.

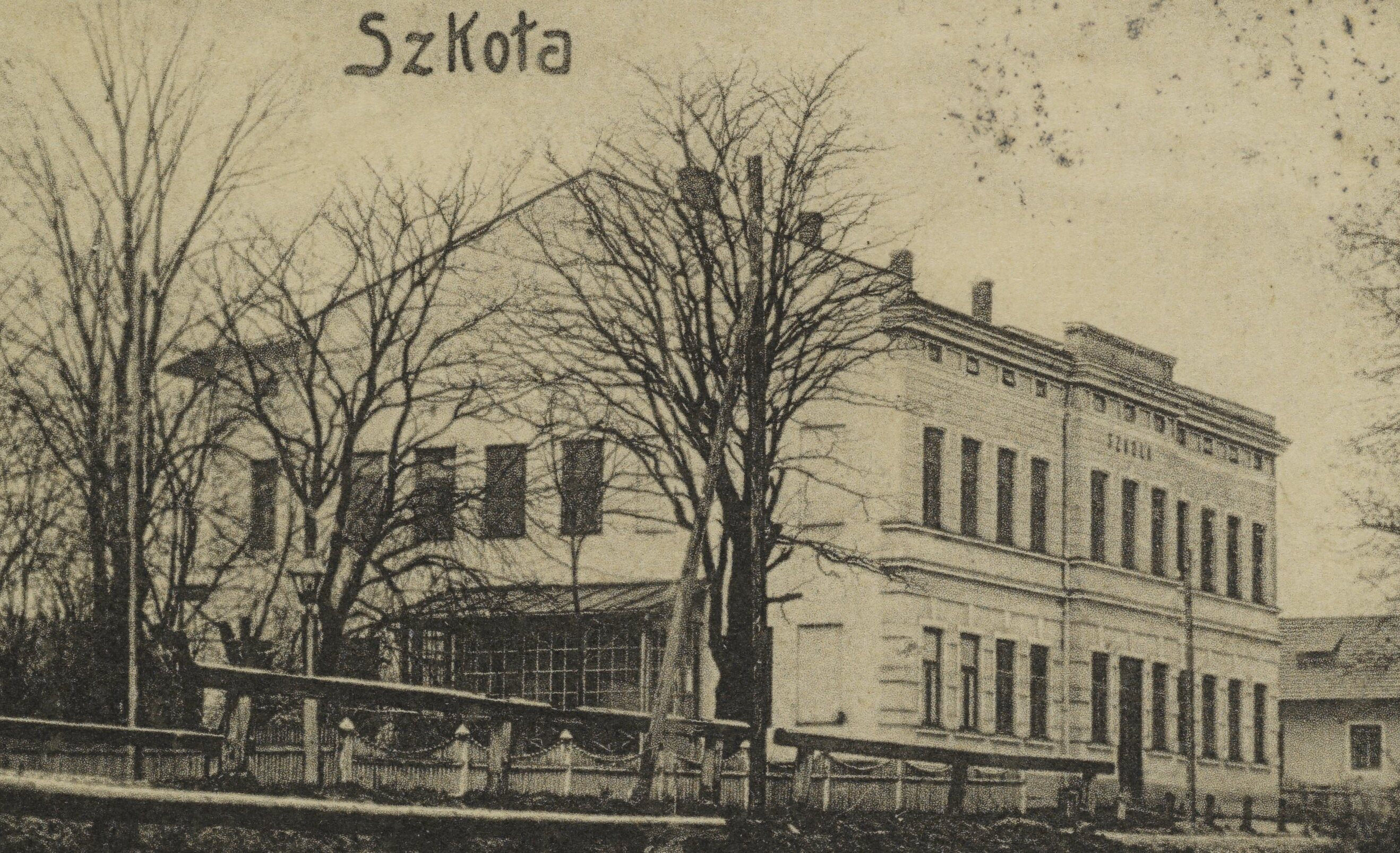
School, before 1914

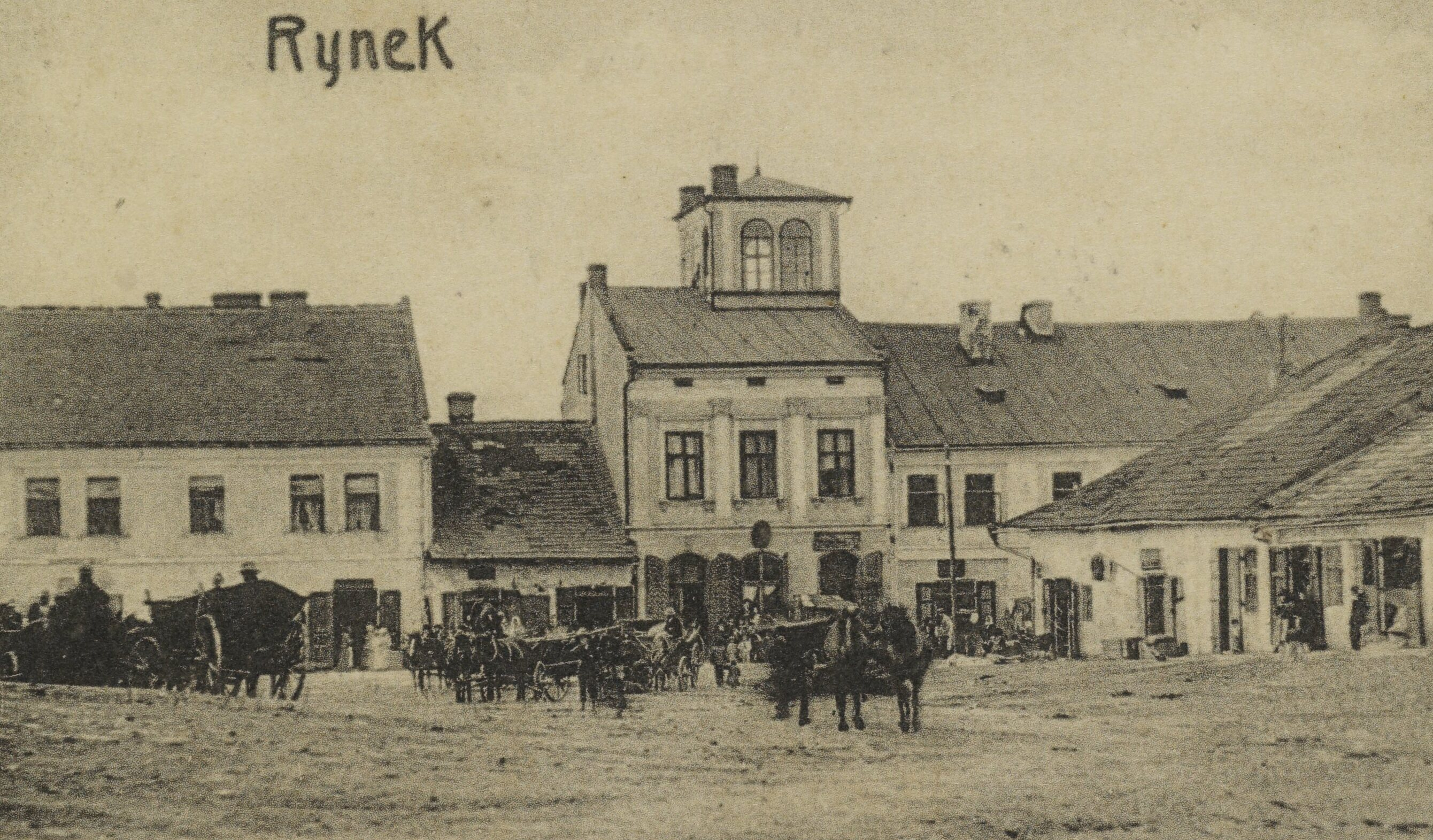
Market square, before 1914

== Economy ==
The boiler factory "Sefako" is located in the town.

== International relations ==
Sędziszów is twinned with

- Mykulyntsi, Ukraine
- Skala-Podilska, Ukraine
