= Kolonia Poczesna =

- Village
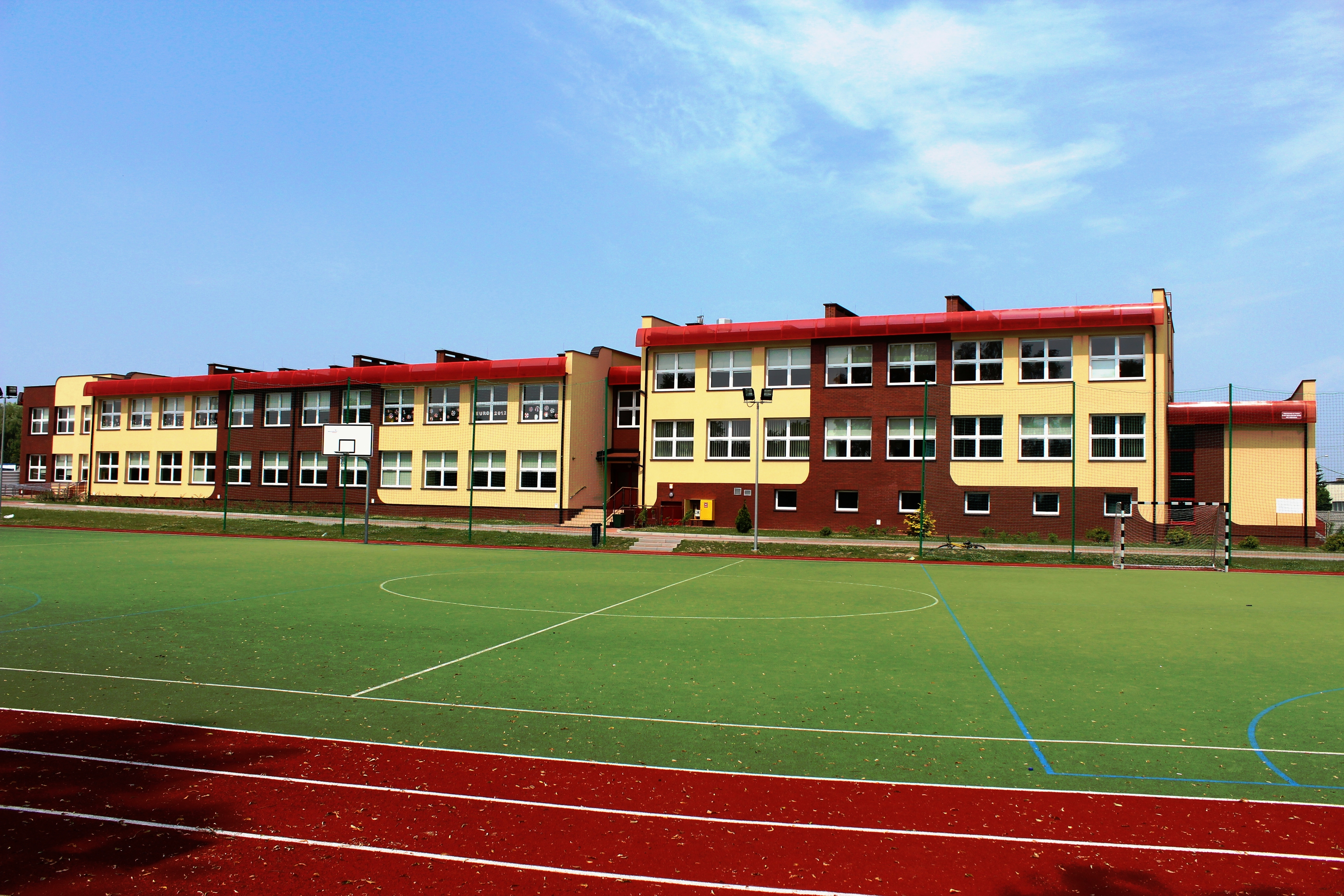
- Elementary School in Poczesna

- Location within Poland
- Coordinates: 50°42′N 19°9′E
- Country: Poland
- Voivodeship: Silesian
- County: Częstochowa
- Gmina: Poczesna
- Population: 1,026

Kolonia Poczesna [kɔˈlɔɲa pɔˈt͡ʂɛsna] is a village in the administrative district of Gmina Poczesna, within Częstochowa County, Silesian Voivodeship, in southern Poland.

== Position ==
Kolonia Poczesna is adjacent to the Warta River, lying in its valley. This area is covered by the Upper Warta Lowering mesoregion, which is part of the Woźnicko-Wieluńska Upland. This, however, falls within the area of the Silesian-Krakow Upland. The Warta catchment area is under protection. A small river flows through the village, flowing into the Warta River, having its source near Bargły. The village lies approximately 3 km (2 mi) south-east of Poczesna, 12 km (7 mi) south of Częstochowa, and 52 km (32 mi) north of the regional capital Katowice.

== History ==
In the inter-war and post-war period, the village was the seat of the gromada in the Gmina Poczesna, Częstochowa County, Kielce Voivodship. During World War II, 5 inhabitants of the village died - two soldiers - participants of the defensive war of 1939, one soldier of the Home Army, two were murdered by German soldiers. In 1954–1973 Kolonia Poczesna was part of the gromada Poczesna, in the Częstochowa County, in the Stalinogród Voivodship (from 1956 Katowice). There are public buildings in the village: health center, primary school named after Gustaw Morcinek, kindergarten and fire station. The Municipal Complex of Health Centers is located in a building built in 1937, where before World War II there was a primary school named after Józef Piłsudski. The building underwent a major renovation in 2009–2010. In 1965, with the support of the "Osiny" Iron Ore Mine, a primary school building (the so-called millennium) was built. In 2011, after the demolition of the old school, a new building was opened. The Volunteer Fire Department has been based in the present place since 1926. The fire station was built in 1954–1962.

In 2008, the town was inhabited by 1,026 people. In the 1970s and 1980s, an estate of single-family houses was established in the former parish fields.

In 2010, the town was hit by a flood as a result of the flooding of the Warta River.
