= Częstochowa Ghetto uprising =

1943 insurrection against German occupational forces by the Jews of Częstochowa, Poland

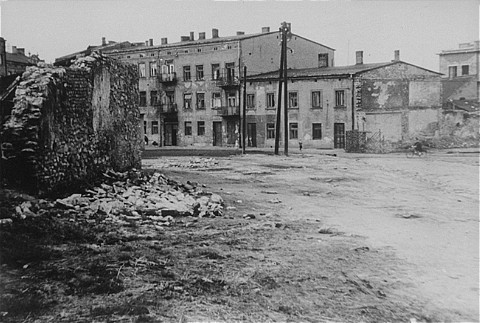
- Shelled Warsaw Square in Częstochowa circa 1944 after the Częstochowa Ghetto uprising, renamed as Ghetto Heroes Square after the war
- Location: Częstochowa Ghetto, Nazi occupied Poland
- Launched: June 25, 1943
- Suppressed: June 30, 1943

The Częstochowa Ghetto uprising was an insurrection in Poland's Częstochowa Ghetto against German occupational forces during World War II. It took place in late June 1943, resulting in some 2,000 Jews being killed.

The ghetto was established following a day known as Bloody Monday, a day in which the Nazis killed 300 Jewish citizens in its occupation of the city of Częstochowa. The ghetto lasted from its inception on September 3, 1939, to its liberation by the Soviet Red Army in January 1945. The prisoners of the ghetto were forced to work in slave labor factories. Throughout the life of this site, it housed 48,000 Polish Jews – of which, 40,000 were deported to Treblinka extermination camp.

The first instance of armed resistance took place on January 4, 1943, at the so-called Large Ghetto established by the Germans in April 1941. During the 'selection' of some 500 Jews to be deported to the ghetto in Radomsko, shooting broke out at the Warsaw Square (now, Ghetto Heroes Square) in which Mendel Fiszelewicz (Fiszelowicz) along with Isza Fajner were killed. 50 young Jews were executed in reprisal.

== Full-scale insurgency ==
The final liquidation of the so-called Small Ghetto (work camp for munitions factory) commenced in June 1943, after four months of mass executions at the Cemetery (Jewish elders, children, intellectuals) and 'selections' of Jews for deportations to slave labour camps including in Bliżyn. On June 25 (or 26), 1943 a full uprising broke out, organized by the Organisation of Jewish Fighters, even though the insurgents were weakly armed. They barricaded themselves in bunkers along the Nadrzeczna Street. In the fighting and subsequent massacres 1,500 Jews died. The leader of the uprising, Mordechaj Zylberberg, committed suicide as the Germans were about to capture his bunker on Nadrzeczna. The uprising was suppressed on June 30, 1943 with additional 500 Jews burned alive or buried beneath the rubble of the Small Ghetto. The remaining 3,900 fugitives were rounded up and sent to camp in Warta or incarcerated at the nearby work prisons, Hasag Pelcery and Huta Częstochowa. However, the Częstochowa Ghetto was not liquidated. Some 10,000 Jews were brought in from Skarżysko-Kamienna in 1944. Around 5,200 of them were liberated by the Red Army in mid January 1945.
