= Kolonia Borek =

- Settlement
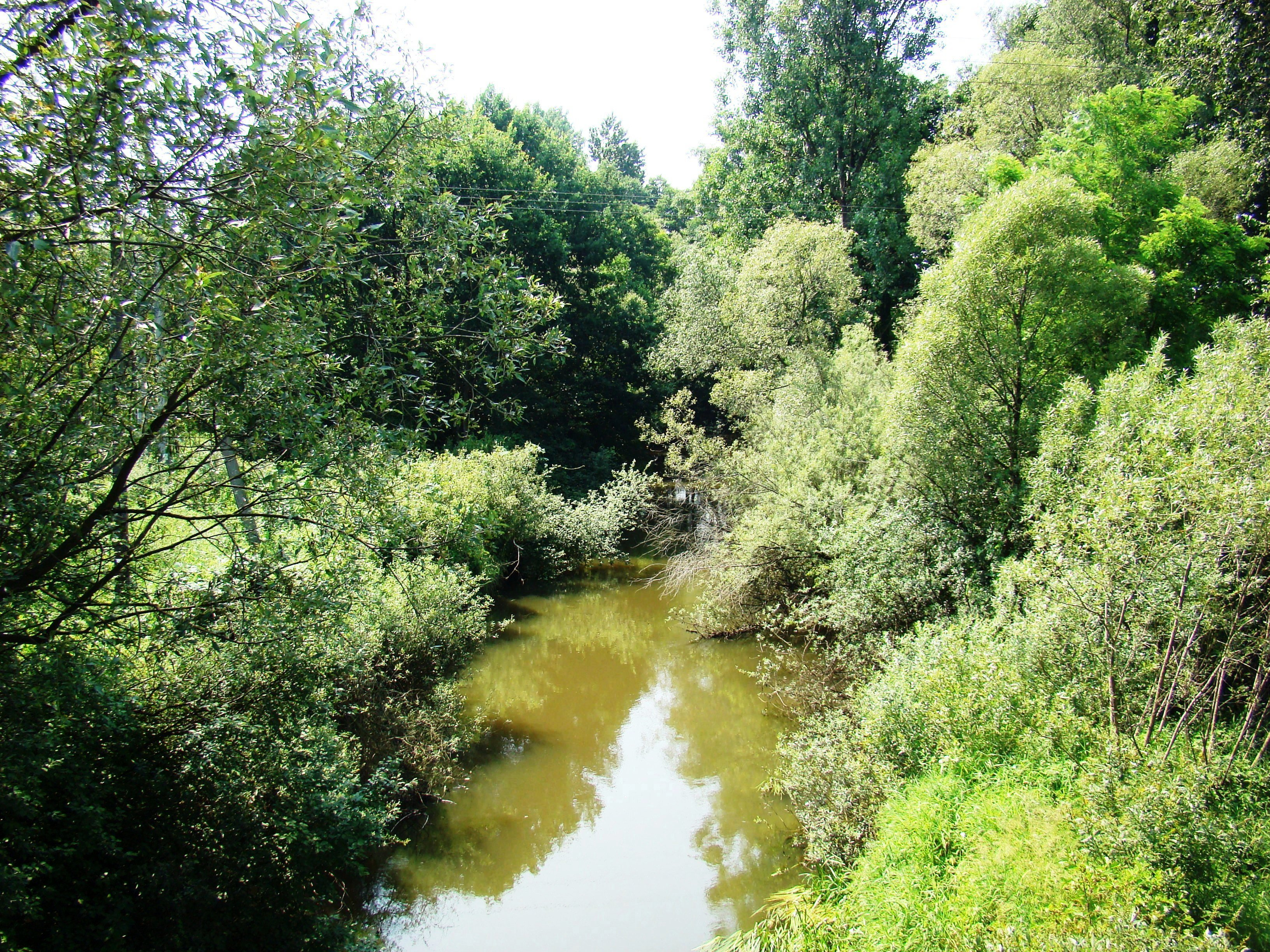
- Warta river

- Location within Poland
- Coordinates: 50°41′N 19°9′E
- Country: Poland
- Voivodeship: Silesian
- County: Częstochowa
- Gmina: Poczesna
- Population: 358

Kolonia Borek [kɔˈlɔɲa ˈbɔrɛk] is a settlement in the administrative district of Gmina Poczesna, within Częstochowa County, Silesian Voivodeship, in southern Poland.
