= Michałów, Gmina Poczesna =

Michałów
- Village
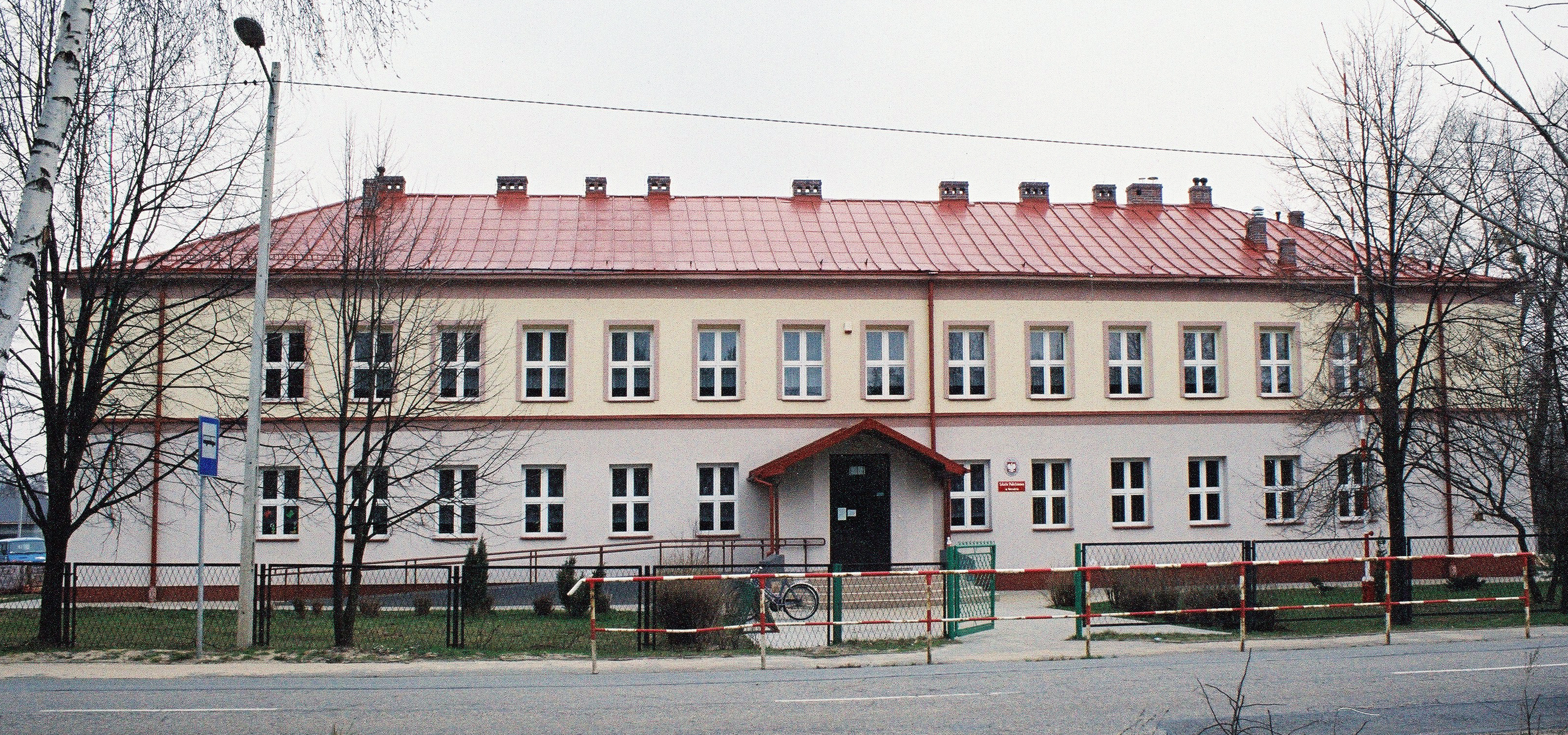
- Elementary School in Nierada

- Location within Poland
- Coordinates: 50°42′N 19°5′E
- Country: Poland
- Voivodeship: Silesian
- County: Częstochowa
- Gmina: Poczesna
- Population: 252

Michałów [miˈxawuf] is a village in the administrative district of Gmina Poczesna, within Częstochowa County, Silesian Voivodeship, in southern Poland.
