= Młynek, Silesian Voivodeship =

Młynek
- Settlement
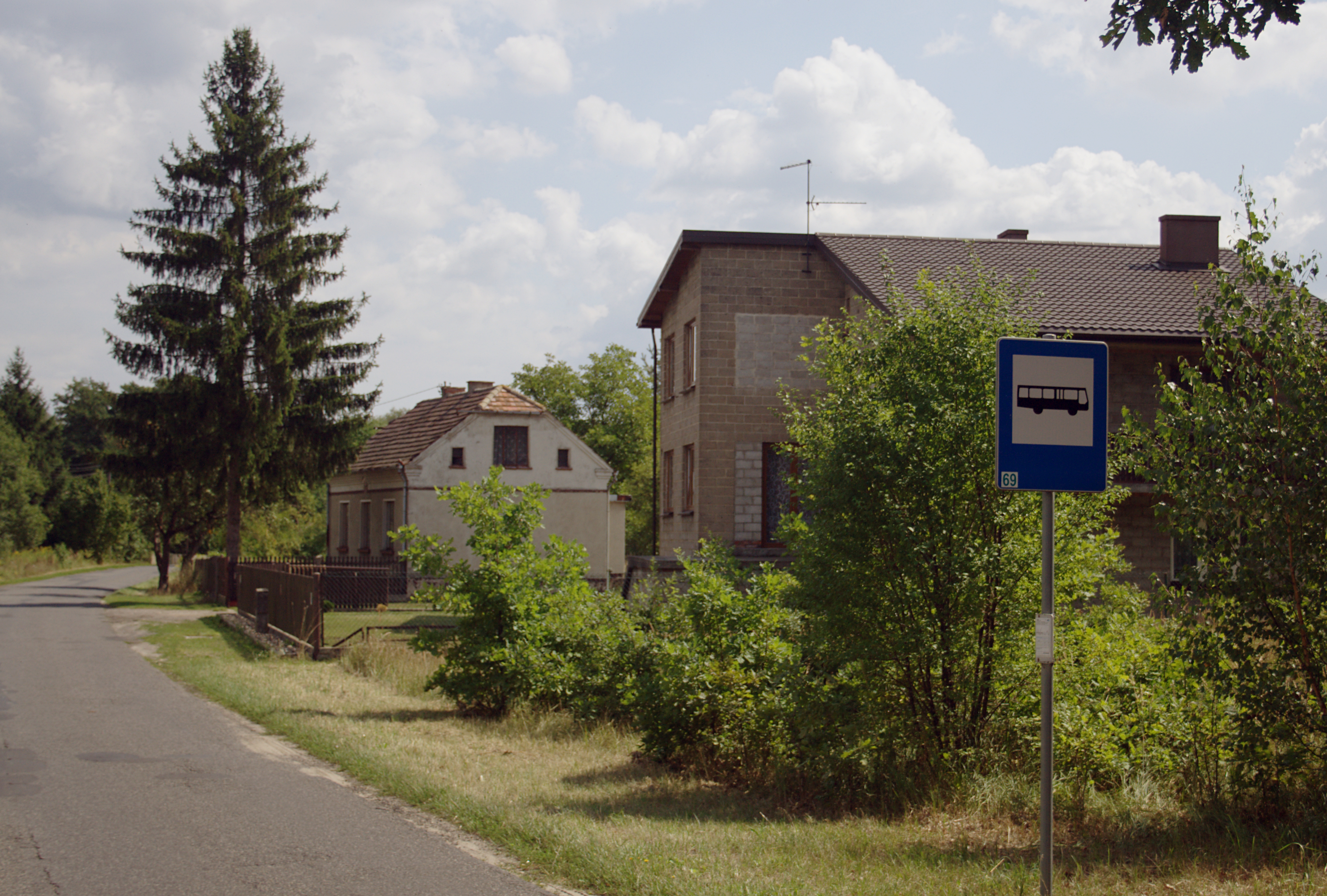

- Location within Poland
- Coordinates: 50°43′N 19°5′E
- Country: Poland
- Voivodeship: Silesian
- County: Częstochowa
- Gmina: Poczesna
- Population: 28

Młynek [ˈmwɨnɛk] is a settlement in the administrative district of Gmina Poczesna, within Częstochowa County, Silesian Voivodeship, in southern Poland.
