= Korwinów =

- Village
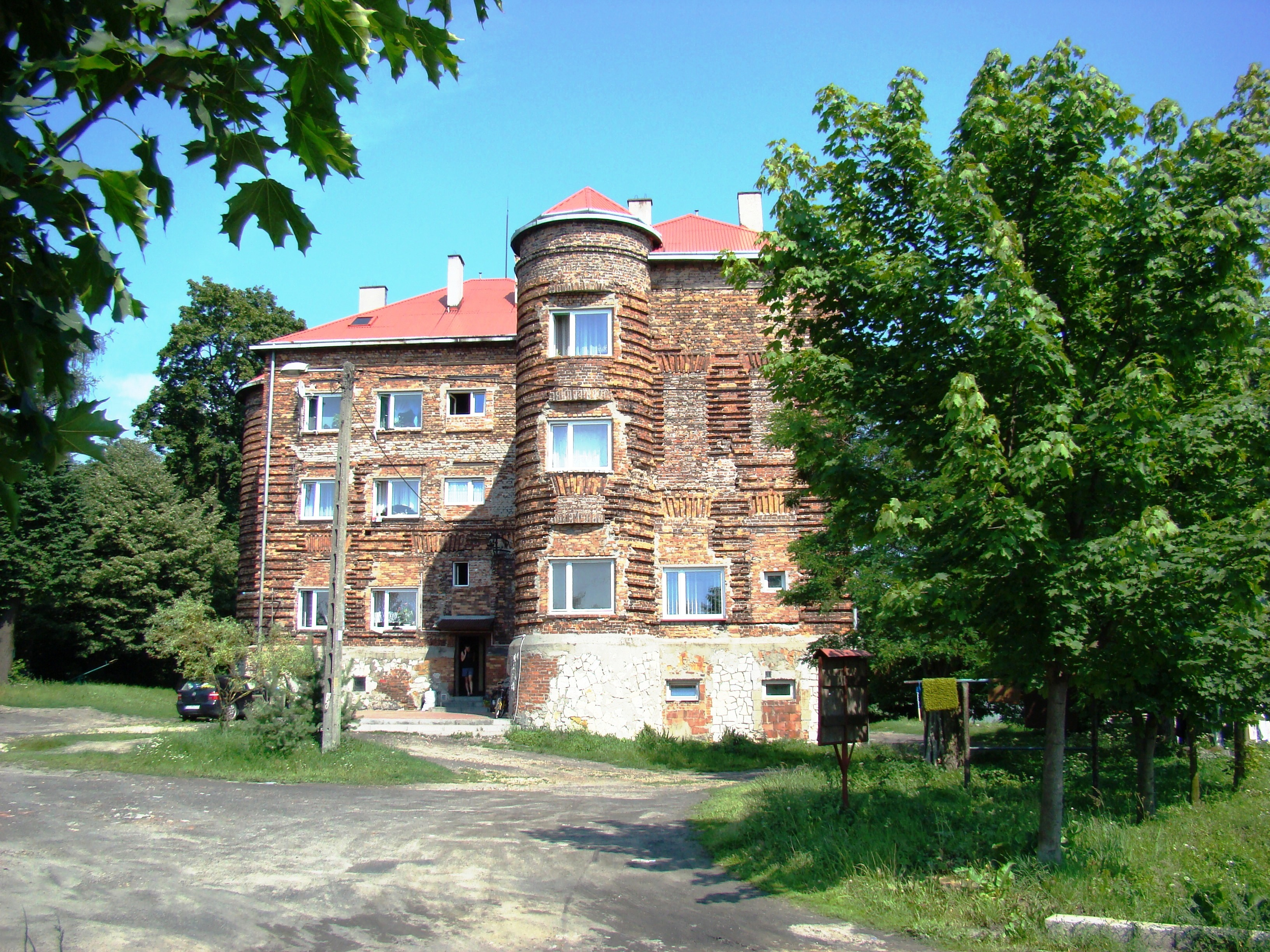
- Manor of the brickyard owners from the end of 19th century

- Location within Poland
- Coordinates: 50°44′N 19°10′E
- Country: Poland
- Voivodeship: Silesian
- County: Częstochowa
- Gmina: Poczesna

Population
  - Total: 461

Korwinów [kɔrˈvinuf] is a village in the administrative district of Gmina Poczesna, within Częstochowa County, Silesian Voivodeship, in southern Poland.
