= Mazury, Silesian Voivodeship =

Mazury
- Village
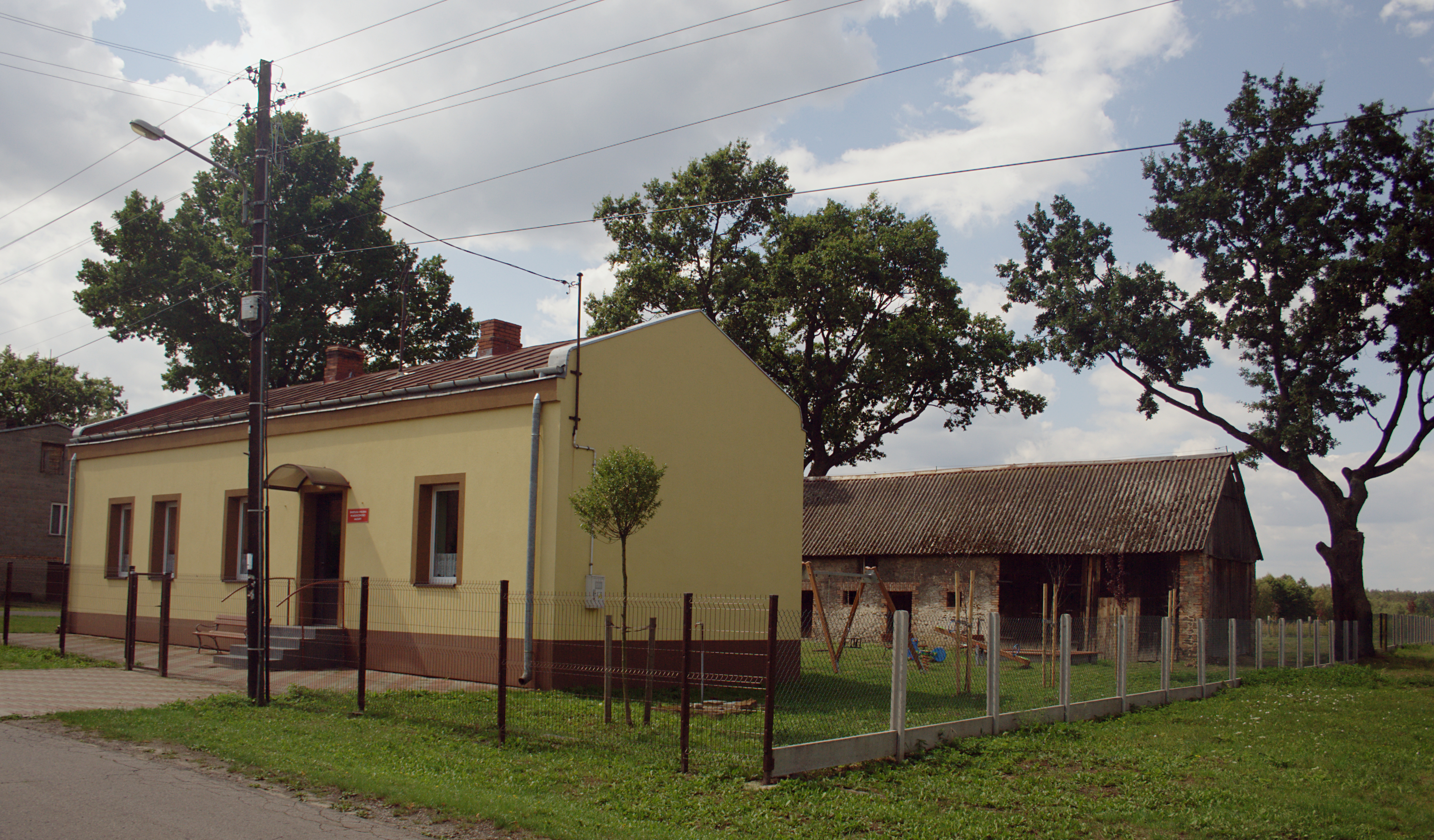

- Location within Poland
- Coordinates: 50°43′N 19°5′E
- Country: Poland
- Voivodeship: Silesian
- County: Częstochowa
- Gmina: Poczesna
- Population: 145

Mazury [maˈzurɨ] is a village in the administrative district of Gmina Poczesna, within Częstochowa County, Silesian Voivodeship, in southern Poland.
