= Dębowiec, Częstochowa County =

Dębowiec
- Settlement
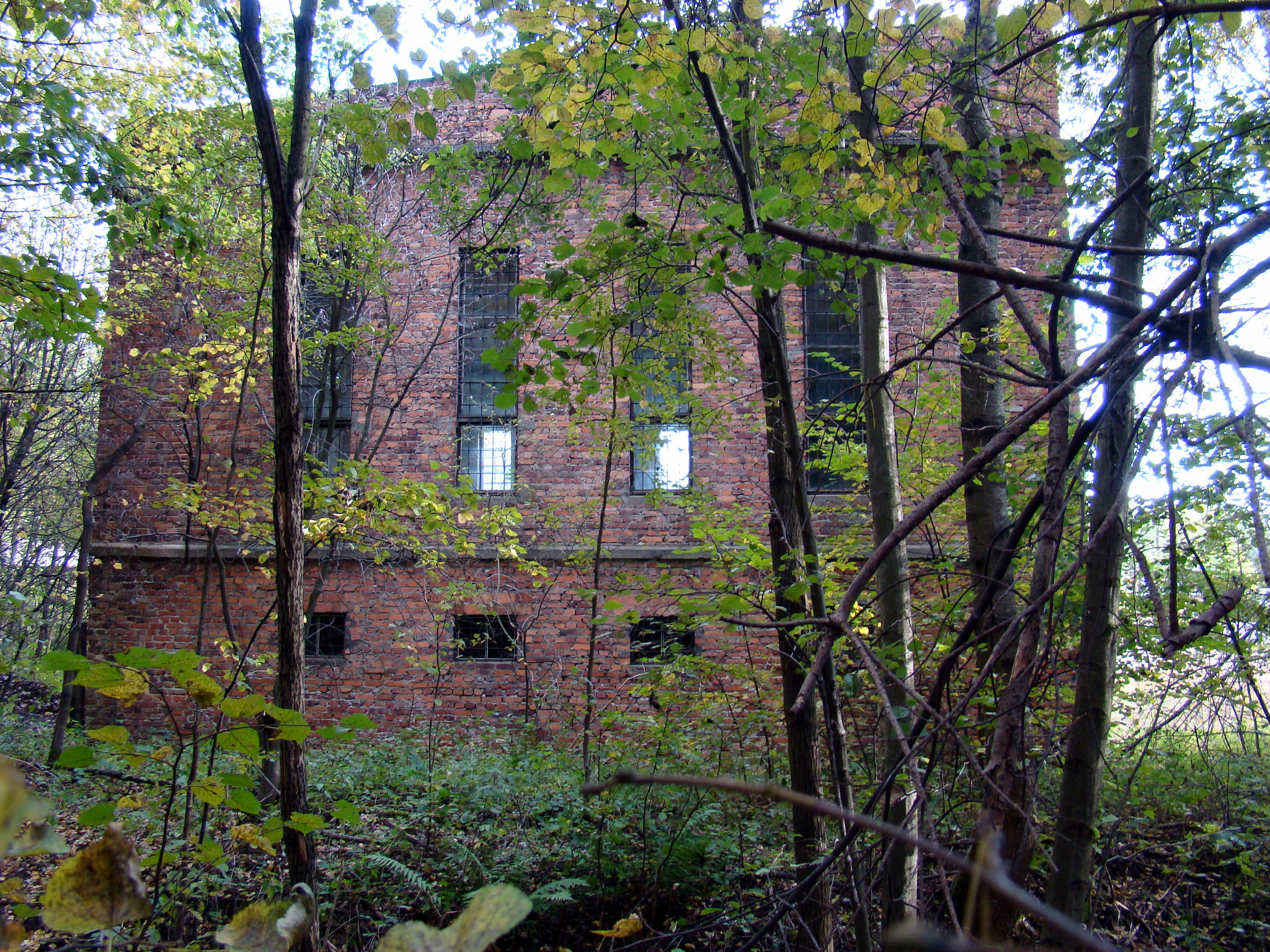
- Building of an abandoned iron ore mine

- Location within Poland
- Coordinates: 50°41′59″N 19°14′27″E
- Country: Poland
- Voivodeship: Silesian
- County: Częstochowa
- Gmina: Poczesna

Population
  - Total: 26

Dębowiec [dɛmˈbɔvjɛt͡s] is a settlement in the administrative district of Gmina Poczesna, within Częstochowa County, Silesian Voivodeship, in southern Poland.
