= Nowa Wieś, Gmina Poczesna =

Nowa Wieś
- Village
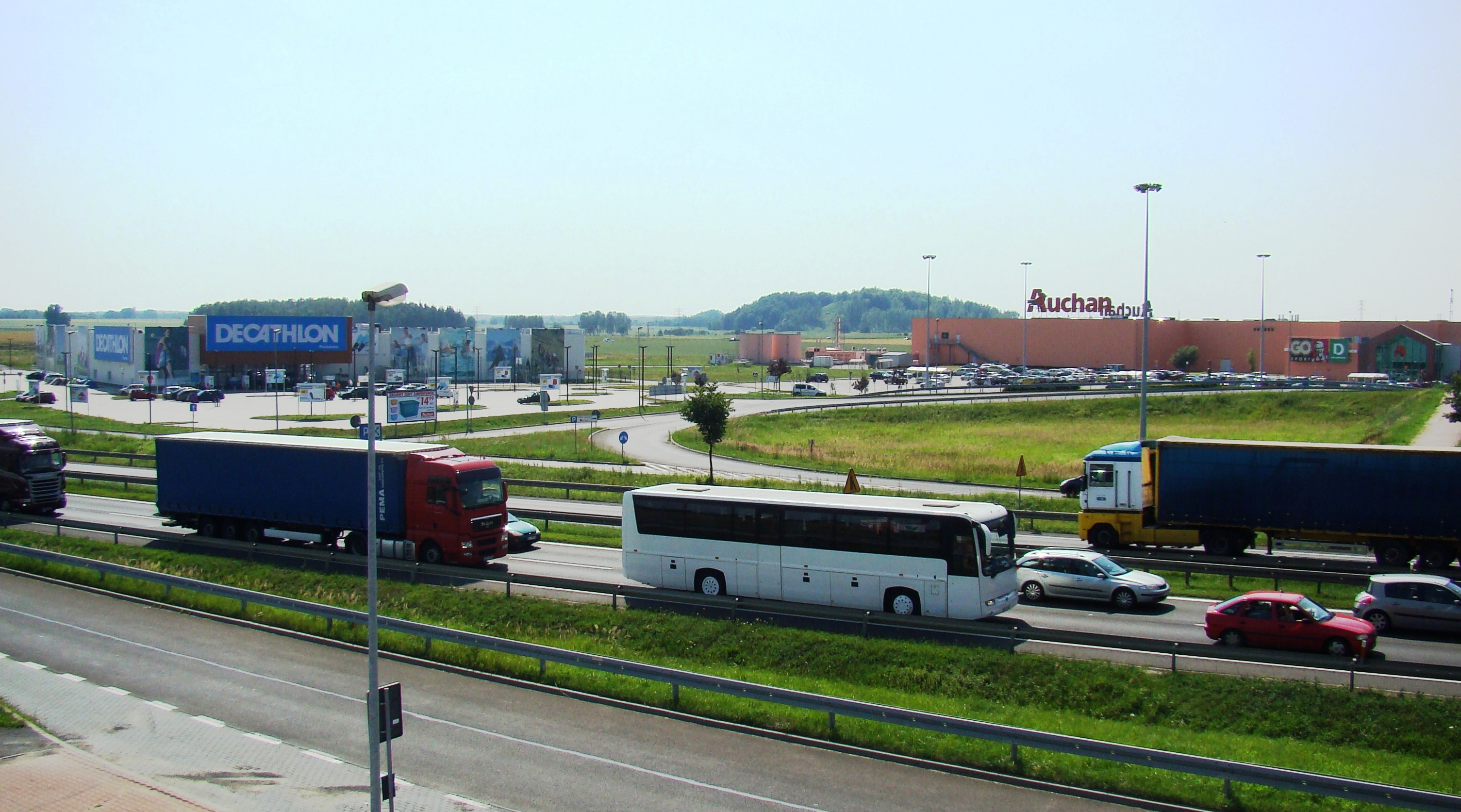

- Location within Poland
- Coordinates: 50°43′50″N 19°9′58″E
- Country: Poland
- Voivodeship: Silesian
- County: Częstochowa
- Gmina: Poczesna
- Population: 638

Nowa Wieś [ˈnɔva ˈvjɛɕ] is a village in the administrative district of Gmina Poczesna, within Częstochowa County, Silesian Voivodeship, in southern Poland.
