= Gmina Poczesna =

Gmina Poczesna Poczesna Commune
- Gmina
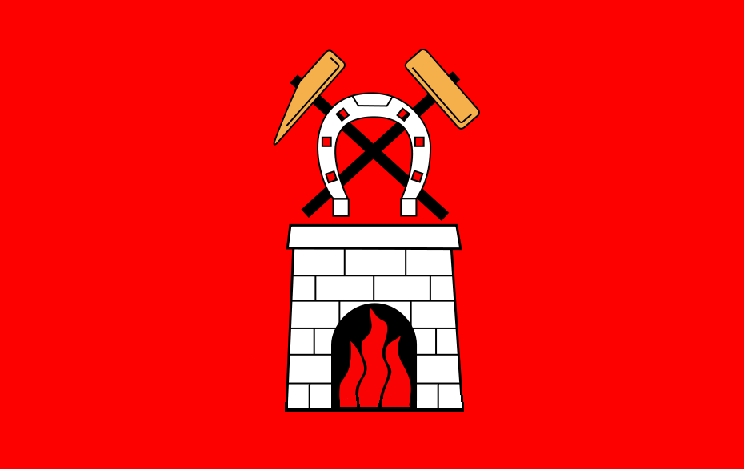
- Flag Coat of arms
- Interactive map of Gmina Poczesna
- Coordinates (Poczesna): 50°43′N 19°8′E
- Country: Poland
- Voivodeship: Silesian
- County: Częstochowa
- Seat: Poczesna

Area
  - Total: 60.13 km^{2} (23.22 sq mi)

Population (2019-06-30)
  - Total: 12,684
  - Density: 210.9/km^{2} (546.3/sq mi)
- Website: https://www.poczesna.pl/

Gmina Poczesna is a rural gmina (administrative district) in Częstochowa County, Silesian Voivodeship, in southern Poland. Its seat is the village of Poczesna, which lies approximately 10 kilometres (6 mi) south of Częstochowa and 53 km (33 mi) north of the regional capital Katowice.

The gmina covers an area of 60.13 square kilometres (23.2 sq mi), and as of 2019 its total population is 12,684.

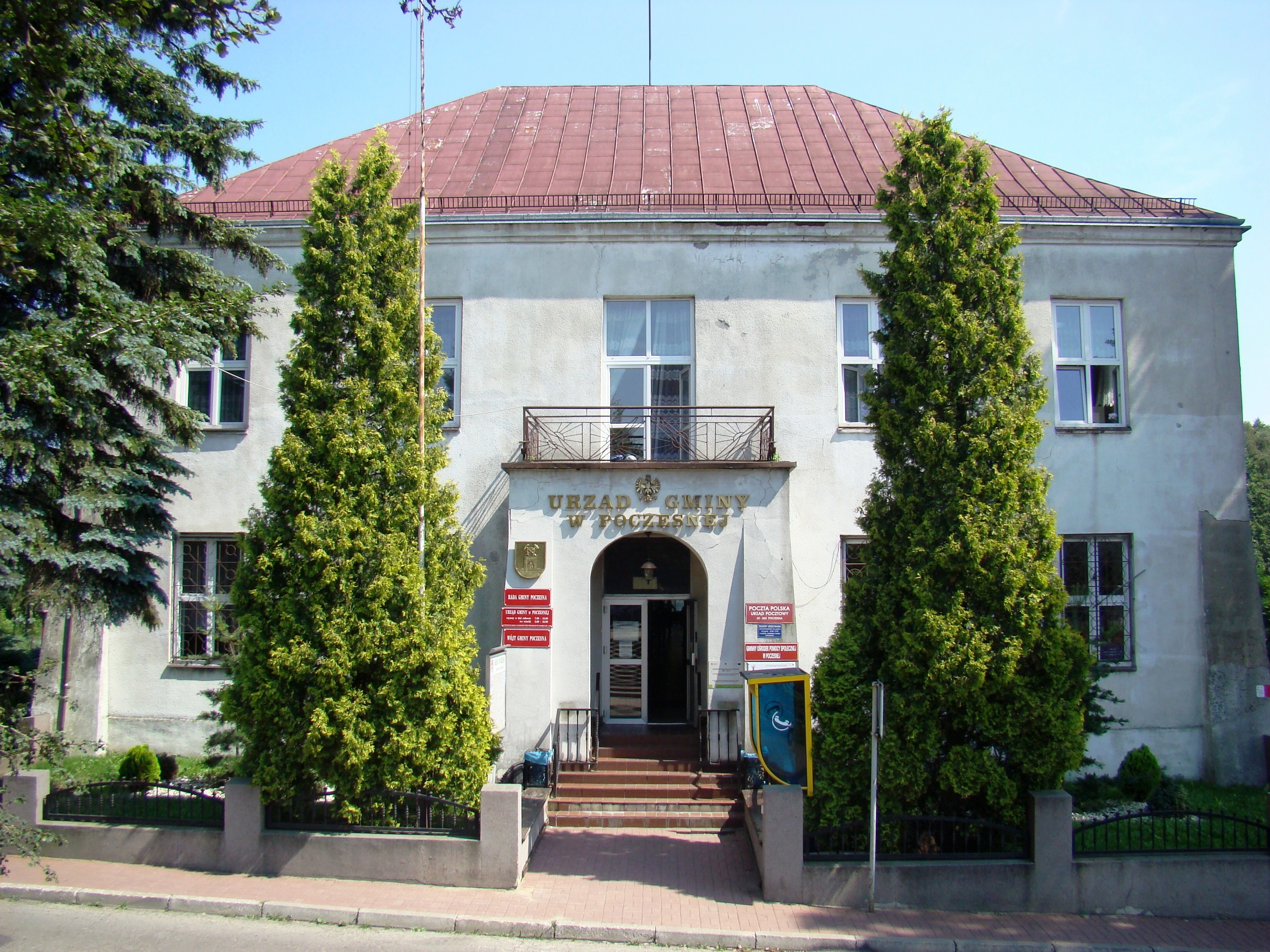
Gmina office in Poczesna

== Villages ==
Gmina Poczesna contains the villages and settlements of Bargły, Brzeziny Nowe, Brzeziny-Kolonia, Dębowiec, Huta Stara A, Huta Stara B, Kolonia Borek, Kolonia Poczesna, Korwinów, Mazury, Michałów, Młynek, Nierada, Nowa Wieś, Poczesna, Słowik, Sobuczyna, Wrzosowa and Zawodzie.

== Neighbouring gminas ==
Gmina Poczesna is bordered by the city of Częstochowa and by the gminas of Kamienica Polska, Konopiska, Olsztyn and Starcza.
