= Brzeziny-Kolonia =

- Village
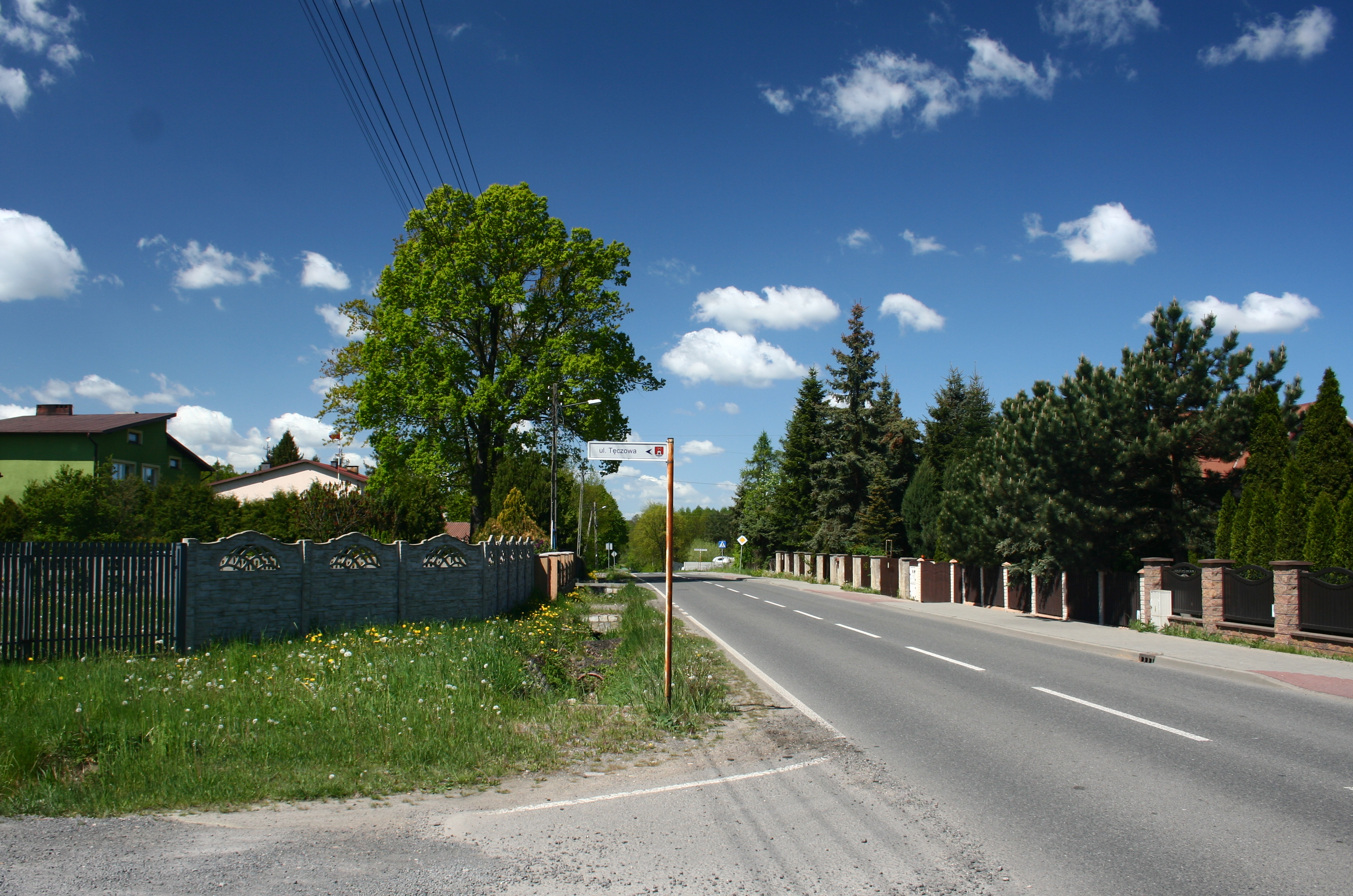

- Location within Poland
- Coordinates: 50°44′N 19°6′E
- Country: Poland
- Voivodeship: Silesian
- County: Częstochowa
- Gmina: Poczesna
- Elevation: 280 m (920 ft)
- Population: 499

Brzeziny-Kolonia [bʐɛˈʑinɨ kɔˈlɔɲa] is a village in the administrative district of Gmina Poczesna, within Częstochowa County, Silesian Voivodeship, in southern Poland.
