= Zawodzie, Silesian Voivodeship =

Zawodzie
- Village
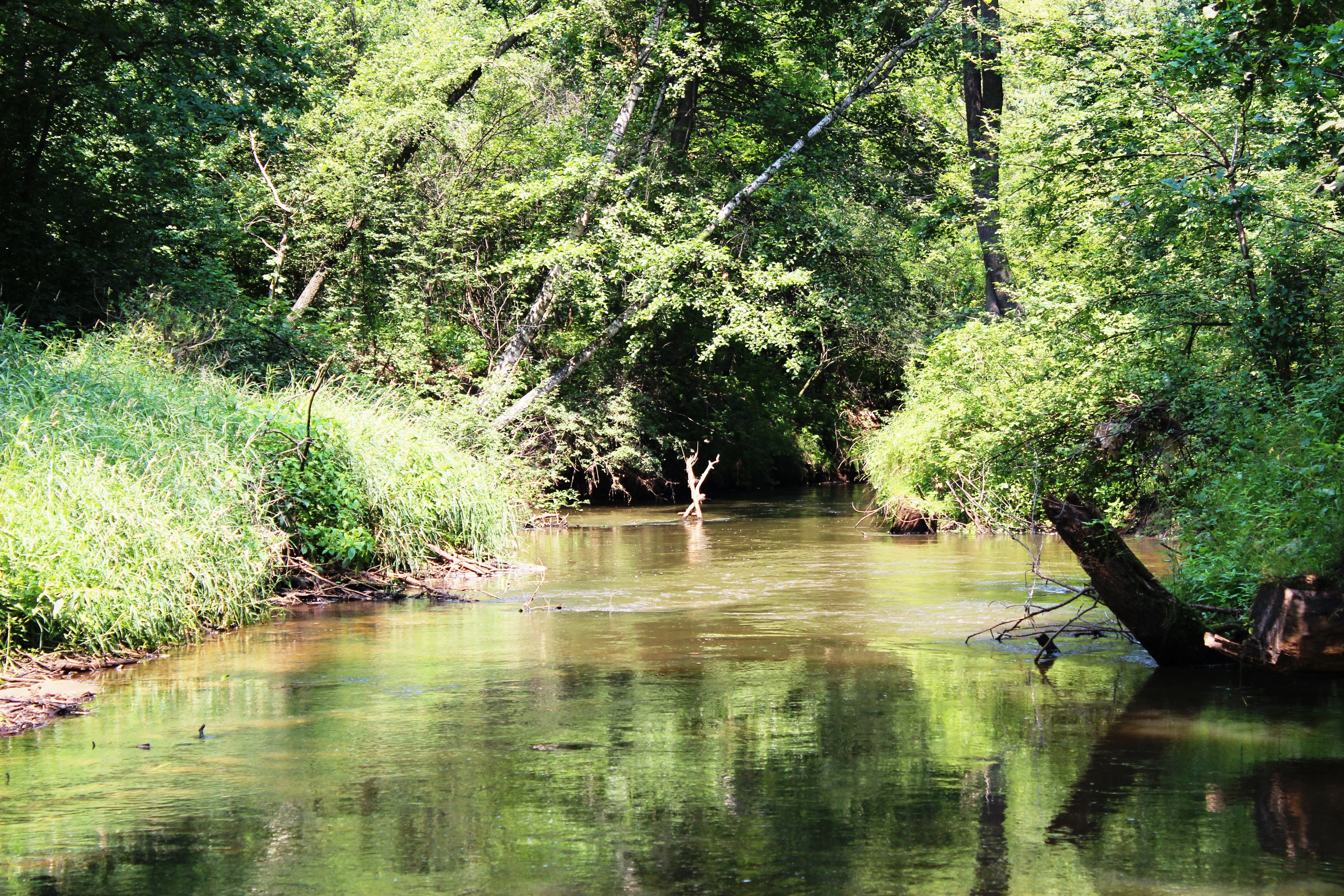
- Warta river between Poczesna and Zawodzie

- Location within Poland
- Coordinates: 50°42′N 19°10′E
- Country: Poland
- Voivodeship: Silesian
- County: Częstochowa
- Gmina: Poczesna
- Population: 657

Zawodzie [zaˈvɔd͡ʑɛ] is a village in the administrative district of Gmina Poczesna, within Częstochowa County, Silesian Voivodeship, in southern Poland.
