= Bargły =

- Village
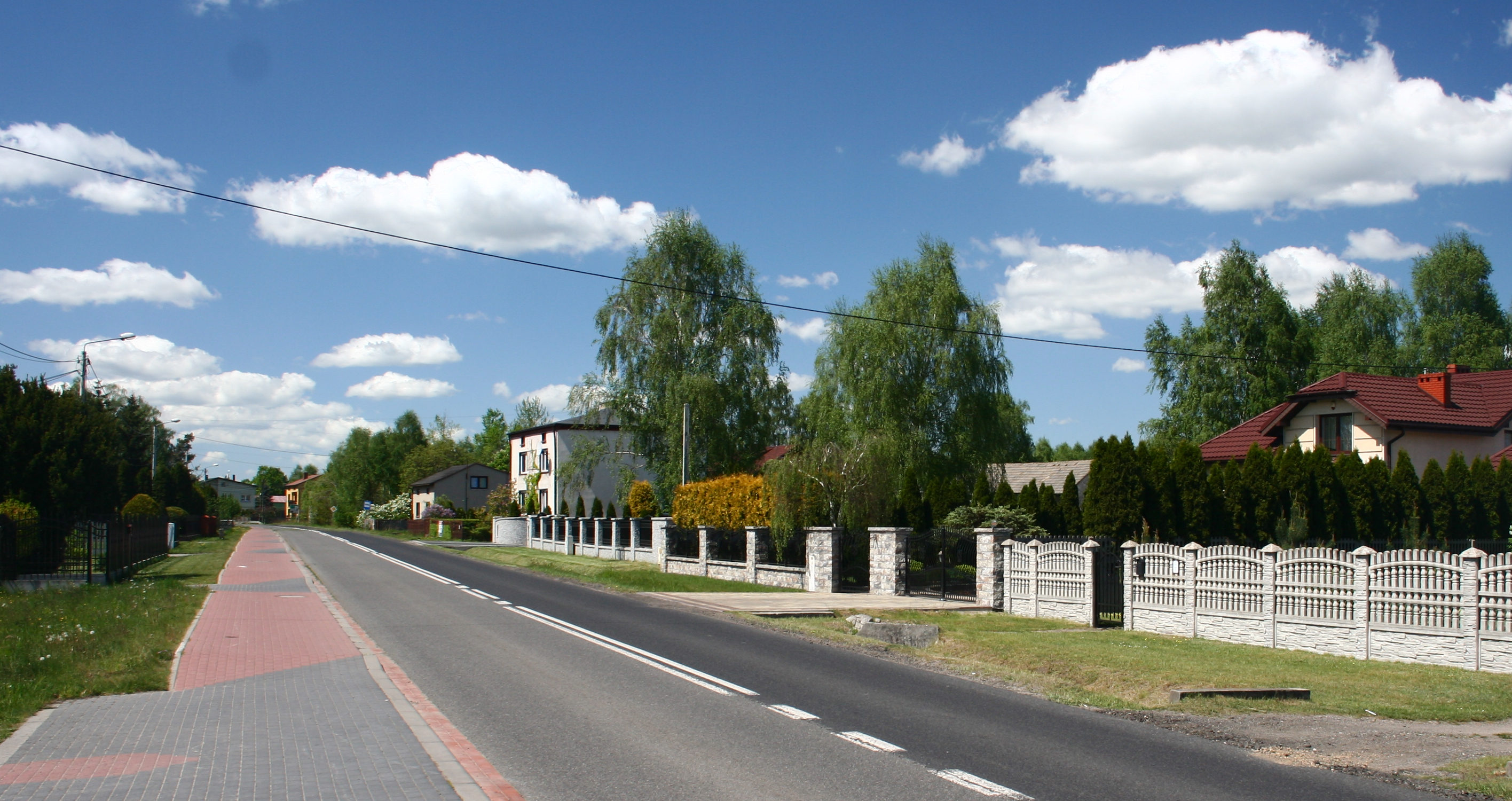

- Location within Poland
- Coordinates: 50°42′N 19°7′E
- Country: Poland
- Voivodeship: Silesian
- County: Częstochowa
- Gmina: Poczesna
- Population: 651

Bargły ([ˈbarɡwɨ]) is a village in the administrative district of Gmina Poczesna, within Częstochowa County, Silesian Voivodeship, in southern Poland.
