= Poczesna =

- Village
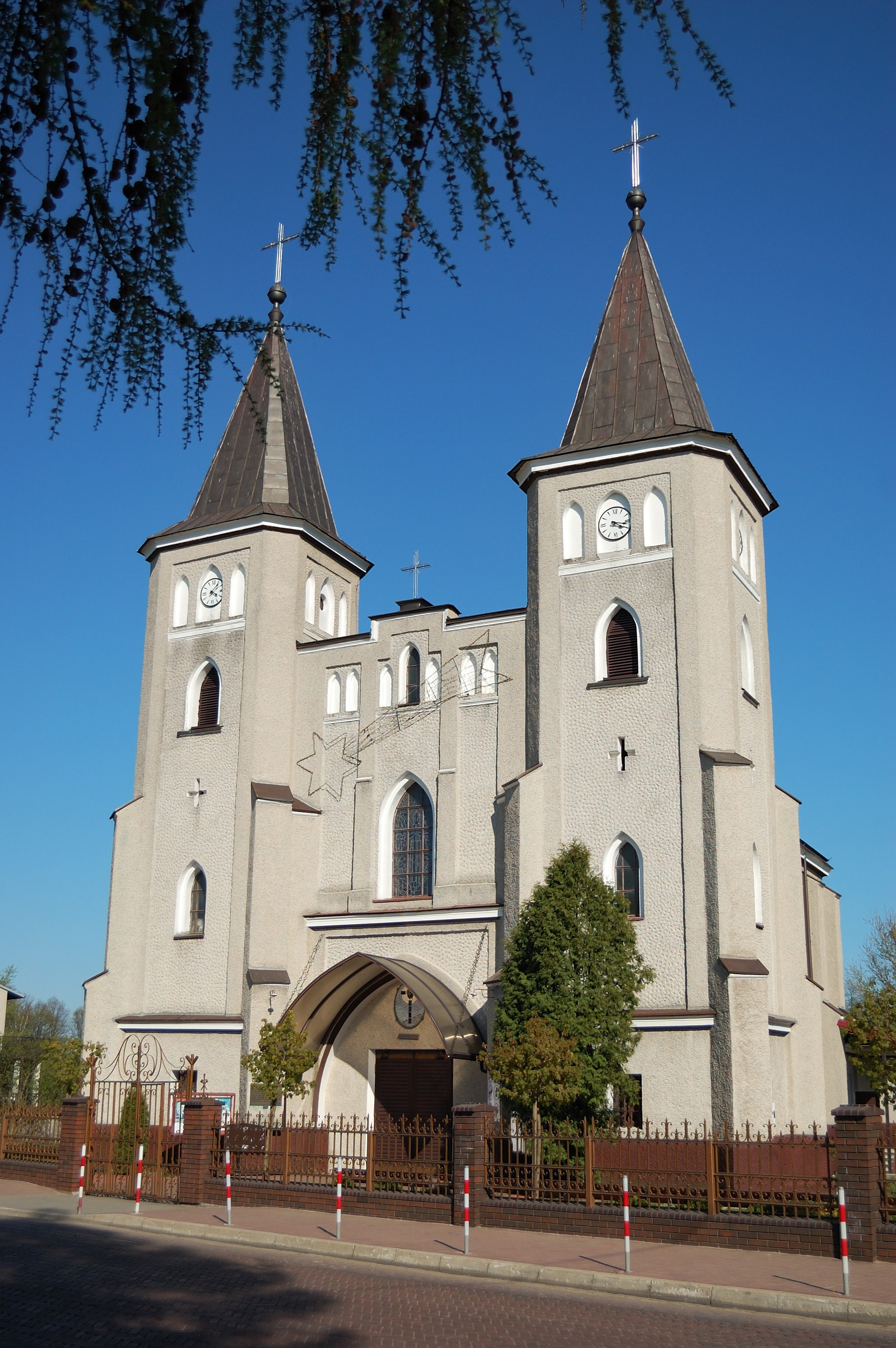
- Church of Saint John the Baptist

- Coat of arms

- Location within Poland
- Coordinates: 50°42′N 19°7′E
- Country: Poland
- Voivodeship: Silesian
- County: Częstochowa
- Gmina: Poczesna

Population
  - Total: 786

Poczesna [pɔˈt͡ʂɛsna] is a village in Częstochowa County, Silesian Voivodeship, in southern Poland. It is the seat of the gmina (administrative district) called Gmina Poczesna.
