= Borovoy (inhabited locality) =

Borovoy (Russian: Боровой; masculine), Borovaya (Боровая; feminine), or Borovoye (Боровое; neuter) is the name of several inhabited localities in Russia.

== Modern localities ==
=== Altai Krai ===
As of 2012, two rural localities in Altai Krai bear this name:

- Borovoy, Altai Krai, a settlement in Malougrenevsky Selsoviet of Biysky District; 52°35′N 85°19′E
- Borovoye, Altai Krai (or Borovoy), a selo in Borovskoy Selsoviet of Krutikhinsky District; 54°2′N 81°11′E

=== Arkhangelsk Oblast ===
As of 2012, two rural localities in Arkhangelsk Oblast bear this name:

- Borovoye, Konoshsky District, Arkhangelsk Oblast, a settlement in Yertsevsky Selsoviet of Konoshsky District
- Borovoye, Velsky District, Arkhangelsk Oblast, a settlement in Blagoveshchensky Selsoviet of Velsky District

=== Belgorod Oblast ===
As of 2012, two rural localities in Belgorod Oblast bear this name:

- Borovoye, Belgorod Oblast, a selo in Novooskolsky District
- Borovaya, Belgorod Oblast, a selo in Starooskolsky District

=== Chelyabinsk Oblast ===
As of 2012, five rural localities in Chelyabinsk Oblast bear this name:

- Borovoy, Chelyabinsk Oblast, a settlement under the administrative jurisdiction of the Town of Verkhny Ufaley
- Borovoye, Bredinsky District, Chelyabinsk Oblast, a selo in Borovskoy Selsoviet of Bredinsky District
- Borovoye, Chebarkulsky District, Chelyabinsk Oblast, a village in Sarafanovsky Selsoviet of Chebarkulsky District
- Borovoye, Krasnoarmeysky District, Chelyabinsk Oblast, a village in Brodokalmaksky Selsoviet of Krasnoarmeysky District
- Borovoye, Oktyabrsky District, Chelyabinsk Oblast, a selo in Borovoy Selsoviet of Oktyabrsky District

=== Irkutsk Oblast ===
As of 2012, one rural locality in Irkutsk Oblast bears this name:

- Borovoye, Irkutsk Oblast, an area in Ziminsky District

=== Ivanovo Oblast ===
As of 2012, one rural locality in Ivanovo Oblast bears this name:

- Borovoye, Ivanovo Oblast, a village in Yuryevetsky District

=== Kaliningrad Oblast ===
As of 2012, one rural locality in Kaliningrad Oblast bears this name:

- Borovoye, Kaliningrad Oblast, a settlement in Gvardeysky Rural Okrug of Bagrationovsky District

=== Republic of Karelia ===
As of 2012, one rural locality in the Republic of Karelia bears this name:

- Borovoy, Republic of Karelia, a settlement in Kalevalsky District

=== Kemerovo Oblast ===
As of 2012, one rural locality in Kemerovo Oblast bears this name:

- Borovoy, Kemerovo Oblast (or Borovy), a settlement in Usmanskaya Rural Territory of Chebulinsky District; 55°55′N 87°24′E

=== Kirov Oblast ===
As of 2012, one rural locality in Kirov Oblast bears this name:

- Borovoy, Kirov Oblast, a settlement under the administrative jurisdiction of Lesnoy Urban-Type Settlement in Verkhnekamsky District; 59°58′N 51°41′E

=== Komi Republic ===
As of 2012, one urban locality in the Komi Republic bears this name:

- Borovoy, Komi Republic, an urban-type settlement under the administrative jurisdiction of the town of republic significance of Ukhta; 63°14′N 52°53′E

=== Leningrad Oblast ===
As of 2012, one rural locality in Leningrad Oblast bears this name:

- Borovoye, Leningrad Oblast, a settlement under the administrative jurisdiction of Kuznechninskoye Settlement Municipal Formation in Priozersky District; 61°6′N 29°56′E

=== Lipetsk Oblast ===
As of 2012, one rural locality in Lipetsk Oblast bears this name:

- Borovoye, Lipetsk Oblast, a selo in Borovskoy Selsoviet of Usmansky District; 52°12′N 39°30′E

=== Novgorod Oblast ===
As of 2012, one rural locality in Novgorod Oblast bears this name:

- Borovaya, Novgorod Oblast, a village in Zhirkovskoye Settlement of Demyansky District

=== Novosibirsk Oblast ===
As of 2012, two rural localities in Novosibirsk Oblast bear this name:

- Borovoye, Novosibirsk Oblast, a selo in Novosibirsky District
- Borovaya, Novosibirsk Oblast, a village in Toguchinsky District

=== Omsk Oblast ===
As of 2012, one rural locality in Omsk Oblast bears this name:

- Borovoye, Omsk Oblast, a settlement in Boyevoy Rural Okrug of Isilkulsky District

=== Oryol Oblast ===
As of 2012, one rural locality in Oryol Oblast bears this name:

- Borovoye, Oryol Oblast, a selo in Borovskoy Selsoviet of Bolkhovsky District

=== Penza Oblast ===
As of 2012, one rural locality in Penza Oblast bears this name:

- Borovaya, Penza Oblast, a village under the administrative jurisdiction of Verkhozim Work Settlement in Kuznetsky District

=== Perm Krai ===
As of 2012, one rural locality in Perm Krai bears this name:

- Borovaya, Perm Krai, a village in Kungursky District

=== Ryazan Oblast ===
As of 2012, two rural localities in Ryazan Oblast bear this name:

- Borovoye, Shilovsky District, Ryazan Oblast, a selo in Borovsky Rural Okrug of Shilovsky District
- Borovoye, Skopinsky District, Ryazan Oblast, a selo in Shelemishevsky Rural Okrug of Skopinsky District

=== Smolensk Oblast ===
As of 2012, three rural localities in Smolensk Oblast bear this name:

- Borovaya, Khislavichsky District, Smolensk Oblast, a village in Gorodishchenskoye Rural Settlement of Khislavichsky District
- Borovaya, Safonovsky District, Smolensk Oblast, a village in Staroselskoye Rural Settlement of Safonovsky District
- Borovaya, Smolensky District, Smolensk Oblast, a village in Mikhnovskoye Rural Settlement of Smolensky District

=== Sverdlovsk Oblast ===
As of 2012, seven rural localities in Sverdlovsk Oblast bear this name:

- Borovoy, Sverdlovsk Oblast, a settlement in Pervomaysky Selsoviet of Serovsky District
- Borovaya, Kushva, Sverdlovsk Oblast, a village in Borovskoy Selsoviet under the administrative jurisdiction of the Town of Kushva
- Borovaya, Alapayevsky District, Sverdlovsk Oblast, a village in Koksharovsky Selsoviet of Alapayevsky District
- Borovaya, Irbitsky District, Sverdlovsk Oblast, a village in Rudnovsky Selsoviet of Irbitsky District
- Borovaya, Talitsky District, Sverdlovsk Oblast, a village in Vnov-Yurmytsky Selsoviet of Talitsky District
- Borovaya, Turinsky District, Sverdlovsk Oblast, a village in Korkinsky Selsoviet of Turinsky District
- Borovaya, Verkhotursky District, Sverdlovsk Oblast, a village in Prokopyevsky Selsoviet of Verkhotursky District

=== Tula Oblast ===
As of 2012, one rural locality in Tula Oblast bears this name:

- Borovoye, Tula Oblast, a village in Novodoletsky Rural Okrug of Belyovsky District

=== Tver Oblast ===
As of 2012, four rural localities in Tver Oblast bear this name:

- Borovoye, Penovsky District, Tver Oblast, a village in Chaykinskoye Rural Settlement of Penovsky District
- Borovoye, Torzhoksky District, Tver Oblast, a village in Budovskoye Rural Settlement of Torzhoksky District
- Borovaya, Maksatikhinsky District, Tver Oblast, a village in Kostretskoye Rural Settlement of Maksatikhinsky District
- Borovaya, Staritsky District, Tver Oblast, a village in Staritsa Rural Settlement of Staritsky District

=== Tyumen Oblast ===
As of 2012, one rural locality in Tyumen Oblast bears this name:

- Borovoye, Tyumen Oblast, a selo in Borovsky Rural Okrug of Ishimsky District

=== Yaroslavl Oblast ===
As of 2012, one rural locality in Yaroslavl Oblast bears this name:

- Borovaya, Yaroslavl Oblast, a village in Karabikhsky Rural Okrug of Yaroslavsky District

== Alternative names ==
- Borovaya, alternative name of Bor, a village in Ust-Tsilma Selo Administrative Territory of Ust-Tsilemsky District in the Komi Republic; 65°30′N 51°59′E
- Borovaya, alternative name of Borovskaya, a village in Zamezhnaya Selo Administrative Territory of Ust-Tsilemsky District in the Komi Republic; 65°15′N 51°52′E
- Borovaya, alternative name of Chistopolye, a village in Baturinsky Selsoviet of Shadrinsky District in Kurgan Oblast; 55°47′N 63°40′E
- Borovaya, alternative name of Borovskoye, a selo in Borovskoy Selsoviet of Kataysky District in Kurgan Oblast; 56°16′N 62°40′E
- Borovoye, alternative name of Dom otdykha "Borovoye", a settlement in Dzerzhinskoye Settlement Municipal Formation of Luzhsky District in Leningrad Oblast; 58°38′N 29°55′E
- Borovoye, alternative name of Borovskoye, a selo in Borovskoy Selsoviet of Aleysky District in Altai Krai; 52°39′N 82°11′E
- Borovoye, alternative name of Borovskoye, a selo in Borovskoy Selsoviet of Belozersky District in Kurgan Oblast; 55°49′N 65°45′E
- Borovoye, alternative name of Borovichi, a selo in Bakharevsky Selsoviet of Safakulevsky District in Kurgan Oblast; 55°4′N 62°35′E
- Borovoye, alternative name of Burabay, Kazakhstan
- Lake Borovoye, alternative name of Lake Burabay, Kazakhstan

== See also ==
- Baravaya (disambiguation)
- Borova (disambiguation)
- Borowy (disambiguation)
