= Baravaya =

Baravaya (Belarusian: Баравая) or Bororovaya (Russian: Боровая) may refer to the following places in Belarus:

- be:Баравая (Іванаўскі раён), Brest region
- be:Баравая (Жыткавіцкі раён), Gomel region
- Baravaya, Minsk district, Minsk region
- be:Баравая (Пухавіцкі раён), Minsk region
- be:Баравая (Салігорскі раён), Minsk region
- be:Баравая (Слуцкі раён), Minsk region
- be:Баравая (Бабруйскі раён), Mogilev region
- be:Баравая (Касцюковіцкі раён), Mogilev region
- be:Баравая (Краснапольскі раён), Mogilev region
- be:Баравая (Лёзненскі раён), Vitebsk region

== See also ==
- Borovoy (disambiguation)
- Borovaya
- Borowa
