= Maslyakha =

Maslyakha Масляха
- Settlement
- Location within Altai Krai Location within Russia
- Coordinates: 54°03′N 81°15′E
- Country: Russia
- Region: Altai Krai
- District: Krutikhinsky District
- Time zone: UTC+7:00

Maslyakha (Russian: Масляха) is a rural locality (a settlement) in Borovskoy Selsoviet, Krutikhinsky District, Altai Krai, Russia. The population was 222 as of 2013. There are 3 streets.

== Geography ==
Maslyakha is located 13 km north of Krutikha (the district's administrative centre) by road. Borovoye is the nearest rural locality.
