= Parchliny =

- Village
- Location within Poland
- Coordinates: 51°15′N 19°9′E
- Country: Poland
- Voivodeship: Łódź
- County: Bełchatów
- Gmina: Szczerców

Parchliny [parˈxlinɨ] was a village in the administrative district of Gmina Szczerców, within Bełchatów County, Łódź Voivodeship, in central Poland. It lay approximately 10 km (6 mi) south of Szczerców, 20 km (12 mi) south-west of Bełchatów, and 64 km (40 mi) south of the regional capital Łódź.

The village may have been destroyed following the start of mining operations at the Szczerców field of the Bełchatów Coal Mine in 2002.
