= Pryganka =

Pryganka Прыганка
- Selo
- Location within Altai Krai Location within Russia
- Coordinates: 53°57′N 80°48′E
- Country: Russia
- Region: Altai Krai
- District: Krutikhinsky District
- Time zone: UTC+7:00

Pryganka (Russian: Прыганка) is a rural locality (a selo) and the administrative center of Prygansky Selsoviet, Krutikhinsky District, Altai Krai, Russia. The population was 903 as of 2013. There are 11 streets.

== Geography ==
Pryganka is located 28 km west of Krutikha (the district's administrative centre) by road. Podborny and Krasnoryazhsky are the nearest rural localities.
