= Zakovryashino =

Zakovryashino Заковряшино
- Selo
- Location within Altai Krai Location within Russia
- Coordinates: 53°53′N 81°11′E
- Country: Russia
- Region: Altai Krai
- District: Krutikhinsky District
- Time zone: UTC+7:00

Zakovryashino (Russian: Заковряшино) is a rural locality (a selo) and the administrative center of Zakovryashinsky Selsoviet, Krutikhinsky District, Altai Krai, Russia. The population was 736 as of 2013. There are 10 streets.

== Geography ==
Zakovryashino is located 10 km south of Krutikha (the district's administrative centre) by road. Krutikha and Bolshoy Log are the nearest rural localities.
