= Bolshoy Log, Altai Krai =

Bolshoy Log Большой Лог
- Settlement
- Location within Altai Krai Location within Russia
- Coordinates: 53°52′N 81°05′E
- Country: Russia
- Region: Altai Krai
- District: Krutikhinsky District
- Time zone: UTC+7:00

Bolshoy Log (Russian: Большой Лог) is a rural locality (a settlement) in Zakovryashinsky Selsoviet, Krutikhinsky District, Altai Krai, Russia. The population was 93 as of 2013. There is 1 street.

== Geography ==
Bolshoy Log is located 16 km southwest of Krutikha (the district's administrative centre) by road. Zakovryashino is the nearest rural locality.
