= Krasnoryazhsky =

Krasnoryazhsky Красноряжский
- Settlement
- Location within Altai Krai Location within Russia
- Coordinates: 53°55′N 80°58′E
- Country: Russia
- Region: Altai Krai
- District: Krutikhinsky District
- Time zone: UTC+7:00

Krasnoryazhsky (Russian: Красноряжский) is a rural locality (a settlement) in Podborny Selsoviet, Krutikhinsky District, Altai Krai, Russia. The population was 71 as of 2013. There is 1 street.

== Geography ==
Krasnoryazhsky is located 24 km southwest of Krutikha (the district's administrative centre) by road. Podborny is the nearest rural locality.
