= Radostny =

Radostny Радостный
- Settlement
- Location within Altai Krai Location within Russia
- Coordinates: 53°56′N 81°05′E
- Country: Russia
- Region: Altai Krai
- District: Krutikhinsky District
- Time zone: UTC+7:00

Radostny (Russian: Радостный) is a rural locality (a settlement) in Podborny Selsoviet, Krutikhinsky District, Altai Krai, Russia. The population was 223 as of 2013. There are 7 streets.

== Geography ==
Radostny is located 11 km west of Krutikha (the district's administrative centre) by road. Krutikha is the nearest rural locality.
