= Podborny =

Podborny Подборный
- Settlement
- Location within Altai Krai Location within Russia
- Coordinates: 53°59′N 81°00′E
- Country: Russia
- Region: Altai Krai
- District: Krutikhinsky District
- Time zone: UTC+7:00

Podborny (Russian: Подборный) is a rural locality (a settlement) and the administrative center of Podborny Selsoviet, Krutikhinsky District, Altai Krai, Russia. The population was 396 as of 2013. There are 4 streets.

== Geography ==
Podborny is located 18 km northwest of Krutikha (the district's administrative centre) by road. Krasnoryazhsky is the nearest rural locality.
