= Krutikha =

Krutikha (Russian: Крутиха) is the name of several rural localities in Russia:

- Krutikha, Krutikhinsky District, Altai Krai, a selo in Krutikhinsky Selsoviet of Krutikhinsky District of Altai Krai
- Krutikha, Topchikhinsky District, Altai Krai, a settlement in Funtikovsky Selsoviet of Topchikhinsky District of Altai Krai
- Krutikha, Dalmatovsky District, Kurgan Oblast, a selo in Krutikhinsky Selsoviet of Dalmatovsky District of Kurgan Oblast
- Krutikha, Shadrinsky District, Kurgan Oblast, a village in Sosnovsky Selsoviet of Shadrinsky District of Kurgan Oblast
- Krutikha, Nizhny Novgorod Oblast, a village in Khvoshchevsky Selsoviet of Bogorodsky District of Nizhny Novgorod Oblast
- Krutikha, Novgorod Oblast, a village in Gruzinskoye Settlement of Chudovsky District of Novgorod Oblast
- Krutikha, Novosibirsk Oblast, a selo in Kyshtovsky District of Novosibirsk Oblast
- Krutikha, Omsk Oblast, a village in Oktyabrsky Rural Okrug of Gorkovsky District of Omsk Oblast
- Krutikha, Sverdlovsk Oblast, a settlement in Rezhevsky District of Sverdlovsk Oblast
