= Volchno-Burlinskoye =

Volchno-Burlinskoye Волчно-Бурлинское
- Selo
- Location within Altai Krai Location within Russia
- Coordinates: 54°03′N 80°47′E
- Country: Russia
- Region: Altai Krai
- District: Krutikhinsky District
- Time zone: UTC+7:00

Volchno-Burlinskoye (Russian: Волчно-Бурлинское) is a rural locality (a selo) and the administrative center of Volchno-Burlinsky Selsoviet, Krutikhinsky District, Altai Krai, Russia. The population was 1,266 as of 2013. There are 9 streets.

== Geography ==
Volchno-Burlinskoye is located 36 km northwest of Krutikha (the district's administrative centre) by road. Malovolchanka is the nearest rural locality.
