= Marcelów =

Marcelów may refer to the following places:

- Marcelów, Bełchatów County in Łódź Voivodeship (central Poland)
- Marcelów, Zduńska Wola County in Łódź Voivodeship (central Poland)
- Marcelów, Gmina Jedlińsk in Masovian Voivodeship (east-central Poland)
- Marcelów, Gmina Pionki in Masovian Voivodeship (east-central Poland)
