= Kazimierzów =

Kazimierzów may refer to the following places in Poland:

- Kazimierzów, Lower Silesian Voivodeship (south-west Poland)
- Kazimierzów, Bełchatów County in Łódź Voivodeship (central Poland)
- Kazimierzów, Łódź East County in Łódź Voivodeship (central Poland)
- Kazimierzów, Opoczno County in Łódź Voivodeship (central Poland)
- Kazimierzów, Rawa County in Łódź Voivodeship (central Poland)
- Kazimierzów, Skierniewice County in Łódź Voivodeship (central Poland)
- Kazimierzów, Lublin Voivodeship (east Poland)
- Kazimierzów, Gostynin County in Masovian Voivodeship (east-central Poland)
- Kazimierzów, Łosice County in Masovian Voivodeship (east-central Poland)
- Kazimierzów, Mińsk County in Masovian Voivodeship (east-central Poland)
- Kazimierzów, Gmina Stoczek in Masovian Voivodeship (east-central Poland)
- Kazimierzów, Gmina Wierzbno in Masovian Voivodeship (east-central Poland)
- Kazimierzów, Zwoleń County in Masovian Voivodeship (east-central Poland)
