= Puszcza =

Puszcza is a Polish term for a large forest. It may also refer to the following villages:

- Puszcza, Kuyavian-Pomeranian Voivodeship (north-central Poland)
- Puszcza, Łódź Voivodeship (south-central Poland)
- Puszcza, Lublin Voivodeship (east Poland)
- Puszcza, Masovian Voivodeship (north-central Poland)
- Puszcza, Greater Poland Voivodeship (west-central Poland)
- Puszcza, Lubusz Voivodeship (west Poland)
