= Grabek, Łódź Voivodeship =

Grabek
- Village
- Location within Poland
- Coordinates: 51°14′29″N 19°7′18″E
- Country: Poland
- Voivodeship: Łódź
- County: Bełchatów
- Gmina: Szczerców

Grabek [ˈɡrabɛk] was a village in the administrative district of Gmina Szczerców, within Bełchatów County, Łódź Voivodeship, in central Poland. It lay approximately 11 km (7 mi) south of Szczerców, 22 km (14 mi) south-west of Bełchatów, and 65 km (40 mi) south of the regional capital Łódź.

The village was destroyed following the start of mining operations at the Szczerców field of the Bełchatów Coal Mine in 2002.
