= Dubie (disambiguation) =

Dubie may refer to:

== People ==
- Brian Dubie (born 1959), American politician
- Jeanine Dubié (born 1958), French politician
- Josy Dubié, Belgian politician
- Michael Dubie (born 1960), United States Air Force officer
- Norman Dubie (born 1945), American poet
- Wade Dubielewicz (born 1979), Canadian hockey player

== Places ==
- Dubie, Democratic Republic of the Congo
- Dubie, Lesser Poland Voivodeship, Poland
- Dubie, Łódź Voivodeship, Poland
- Dubie, Lviv Oblast, Ukraine
