= Grudna =

Grudna may refer to the following places:

- Grudna, Nowy Tomyśl County in Greater Poland Voivodeship (west-central Poland)
- Grudna, Oborniki County in Greater Poland Voivodeship (west-central Poland)
- Grudna, Łódź Voivodeship (central Poland)
