= Grabek =

Grabek may refer to the following places in Poland:

- Grabek, Lower Silesian Voivodeship (south-west Poland)
- Grabek, Łódź Voivodeship (central Poland)
- Grabek, Greater Poland Voivodeship (west-central Poland)
- Grabek, Warmian-Masurian Voivodeship (north Poland)
