= Świny =

Świny may refer to the following places in Poland:

- Świny, Lower Silesian Voivodeship (south-west Poland)
- Świny, Łódź Voivodeship (central Poland)
