= Borowa =

Borowa may refer to the following places in Poland:

== Populated places ==
- Borowa, Lower Silesian Voivodeship (south-west Poland)
- Borowa, Bełchatów County in Łódź Voivodeship (central Poland)
- Borowa, Łódź East County in Łódź Voivodeship (central Poland)
- Borowa, Piotrków County in Łódź Voivodeship (central Poland)
- Borowa, Gmina Dobryszyce in Łódź Voivodeship (central Poland)
- Borowa, Gmina Gidle in Łódź Voivodeship (central Poland)
- Borowa, Gmina Przedbórz in Łódź Voivodeship (central Poland)
- Borowa, Lublin Voivodeship (east Poland)
- Borowa, Lesser Poland Voivodeship (south Poland)
- Borowa, Dębica County in Subcarpathian Voivodeship (south-east Poland)
- Borowa, Mielec County in Subcarpathian Voivodeship (south-east Poland)
- Borowa, Silesian Voivodeship (south Poland)

== Other ==
- Borowa (Waldenburg Mountains), a mountain in Lower Silesian Voivodeship

== See also ==
- The Borowa people, a clan of the Cubeo descended from the "Maku"
