= Karasi =

Karasi may refer to:

- Kärasi, a village in northeastern Estonia
- Karasi, Altai Krai, a settlement in Russia
- Karasid dynasty, dynasty in northwestern Anatolia (c. 1300–1345)
- Sanjak of Karasi, a Sanjak of the Ottoman Empire
- Karasi Bey, Bey of the Karasids in northwestern Anatolia
- Karasi (horse), Irish-bred Thoroughbred racehorse
- Stanislav Karasi, Yugoslav footballer
