= Bednarze =

Bednarze may refer to the following places:

- Bednarze, Lesser Poland Voivodeship (south Poland)
- Bednarze, Łódź Voivodeship (central Poland)
- Bednarze, Masovian Voivodeship (east-central Poland)
