= Krzyżówki =

Krzyżówki may refer to the following places:

- Krzyżówki, Greater Poland Voivodeship (west-central Poland)
- Krzyżówki, Kuyavian-Pomeranian Voivodeship (north-central Poland)
- Krzyżówki, Łódź Voivodeship (central Poland)
- Krzyżówki, Silesian Voivodeship (south Poland)
