= Krutikhinsky =

Krutikhinsky (masculine), Krutikhinskaya (feminine), or Krutikhinskoye (neuter) may refer to:

- Krutikhinsky District, a district of Altai Krai, Russia
- Krutikhinskoye, a rural locality (a village) in Kurgan Oblast, Russia
