= Borovoye, Altai Krai =

Borovoye Боровое
- Selo
- Location within Altai Krai Location within Russia
- Coordinates: 54°01′N 81°11′E
- Country: Russia
- Region: Altai Krai
- District: Krutikhinsky District
- Time zone: UTC+7:00

Borovoye (Russian: Боровое) is a rural locality (a selo) and the administrative center of Borovskoy Selsoviet, Krutikhinsky District, Altai Krai, Russia. The population was 388 as of 2013. There are 6 streets.

== Geography ==
Borovoye is located 10 km north of Krutikha (the district's administrative centre) by road. Maslyakha is the nearest rural locality.
