= Borovoy (disambiguation) =

Borovoy is a Russian surname.

Borovoy may aso refer to:

- Borovoy (inhabited locality), several inhabited localities in Russia
- Borovoy Bridge, St. Petersburg, Russia
