= Borova =

Borova or Borová (Cyrillic: Борова) may refer to:

== Places ==
=== Albania ===
- Borovë, Korçë, a settlement in the Korçë County
- Borovë, a settlement in the Elbasan County

=== Czech Republic ===
- Borová (Náchod District), a municipality and village in the Hradec Králové Region
- Borová (Svitavy District), a municipality and village in the Pardubice Region
- Borová, a village and part of Budeč (Jindřichův Hradec District) in the South Bohemian Region
- Borová, a village and part of České Heřmanice in the Pardubice Region
- Borová, a village and part of Chvalšiny in the South Bohemian Region
- Borová Lada, a municipality and village in the South Bohemian Region
- Havlíčkova Borová, a market town in the Vysočina Region

=== Ukraine ===
- Borova, Izium Raion, Kharkiv Oblast
- Borova, Chuhuiv Raion, Kharkiv Oblast
- Borova, Kyiv Oblast
- Borova, a river in Ukraine

=== Other ===
- Borova (Novo Goražde), a settlement in the Novo Goražde municipality, Bosnia and Herzegovina
- Borova, a settlement in the Leposavić Municipality, Kosovo
- Borova, Montenegro, a settlement in the Pljevlja Municipality, Montenegro
- Borová, Trnava District, a municipality and village in the Trnava Region, Slovakia
- Borova, Croatia, a village near Suhopolje

== People ==
- Magdaléna Borová, Czech actress

== See also ==
- Borov (disambiguation)
- Borovoy (disambiguation)
