= Felicjanów =

Felicjanów may refer to the following places:

- Felicjanów, Łódź East County in Łódź Voivodeship (central Poland)
- Felicjanów, Poddębice County in Łódź Voivodeship (central Poland)
- Felicjanów, Płock County in Masovian Voivodeship (central Poland)
- Felicjanów, Koło County in Greater Poland Voivodeship (central Poland)
- Felicjanów, Turek County in Greater Poland Voivodeship (central Poland)
