= Karasi, Altai Krai =

Karasi Караси
- Settlement
- Location within Altai Krai Location within Russia
- Coordinates: 53°49′N 81°14′E
- Country: Russia
- Region: Altai Krai
- District: Krutikhinsky District
- Time zone: UTC+7:00

Karasi (Russian: Караси) is a rural locality (a settlement) in Zakovryashinsky Selsoviet, Krutikhinsky District, Altai Krai, Russia. The population was 137 as of 2013. There is 1 street.

== Geography ==
Karasi is located 17 km south of Krutikha (the district's administrative centre) by road. Kamen-na-Obi is the nearest rural locality.
