= Katarzynów =

Katarzynów may refer to the following places:

- Katarzynów, Łódź East County in Łódź Voivodeship (central Poland)
- Katarzynów, Radomsko County in Łódź Voivodeship (central Poland)
- Katarzynów, Zgierz County in Łódź Voivodeship (central Poland)
- Katarzynów, Grójec County in Masovian Voivodeship (east-central Poland)
- Katarzynów, Kozienice County in Masovian Voivodeship (east-central Poland)
- Katarzynów, Lipsko County in Masovian Voivodeship (east-central Poland)
