= Kościuszki =

Kościuszki may refer to the following places:

- Kościuszki, Łódź Voivodeship (central Poland)
- Kościuszki, Gmina Nowogard in West Pomeranian Voivodeship (north-west Poland)
- Kościuszki, Gmina Osina in West Pomeranian Voivodeship (north-west Poland)
