= Stanisławów Pierwszy, Łódź Voivodeship =

Stanisławów Pierwszy
- Village
- Location within Poland
- Coordinates: 51°18′N 19°8′E
- Country: Poland
- Voivodeship: Łódź
- County: Bełchatów
- Gmina: Szczerców

Stanisławów Pierwszy [staniˈswavuf ˈpjɛrfʂɨ] is a village in the administrative district of Gmina Szczerców, within Bełchatów County, Łódź Voivodeship, in central Poland.
