= Zbyszek =

- Village
- Location within Poland
- Coordinates: 51°24′N 19°11′E
- Country: Poland
- Voivodeship: Łódź
- County: Bełchatów
- Gmina: Szczerców
- Population: 20

Zbyszek [ˈzbɨʂɛk] is a village in the administrative district of Gmina Szczerców, within Bełchatów County, Łódź Voivodeship, in central Poland.
