= Osiny-Kolonia =

- Village
- Location within Poland
- Coordinates: 51°16′17″N 19°11′54″E
- Country: Poland
- Voivodeship: Łódź
- County: Bełchatów
- Gmina: Szczerców

Osiny-Kolonia [ɔˈɕinɨ kɔˈlɔɲa] is a village in the administrative district of Gmina Szczerców, within Bełchatów County, Łódź Voivodeship, in central Poland.
