= Długie, Łódź East County =

Długie
- Village
- Location within Poland
- Coordinates: 51°45′N 19°52′E
- Country: Poland
- Voivodeship: Łódź
- County: Łódź East
- Gmina: Koluszki

Długie [ˈdwuɡʲɛ] is a village in the administrative district of Gmina Koluszki, within Łódź East County, Łódź Voivodeship, in central Poland.
