= Kuźnica Lubiecka =

- Village
- Location within Poland
- Coordinates: 51°22′22″N 19°10′11″E
- Country: Poland
- Voivodeship: Łódź
- County: Bełchatów
- Gmina: Szczerców

Kuźnica Lubiecka (Polish pronunciation: [kuʑˈɲit͡sa luˈbjɛt͡ska]) is a village in the administrative district of Gmina Szczerców, within Bełchatów County, Łódź Voivodeship, in central Poland.
