= Załuże, Łódź Voivodeship =

Załuże
- Village
- Location within Poland
- Coordinates: 51°20′12″N 19°7′50″E
- Country: Poland
- Voivodeship: Łódź
- County: Bełchatów
- Gmina: Szczerców

Załuże [zaˈwuʐɛ] is a village in the administrative district of Gmina Szczerców, within Bełchatów County, Łódź Voivodeship, in central Poland.
