= Szczercowska Wieś =

- Village
- Location within Poland
- Coordinates: 51°22′N 19°4′E
- Country: Poland
- Voivodeship: Łódź
- County: Bełchatów
- Gmina: Szczerców

Szczercowska Wieś [ʂt͡ʂɛrˈt͡sɔfska ˈvjɛɕ] is a village in the administrative district of Gmina Szczerców, within Bełchatów County, Łódź Voivodeship, in central Poland.

The people there are farmers.
