= Firlej, Łódź Voivodeship =

Firlej
- Village
- Location within Poland
- Coordinates: 51°23′13″N 19°11′19″E
- Country: Poland
- Voivodeship: Łódź
- County: Bełchatów
- Gmina: Szczerców

Population
  - Total: 20
- Time zone: UTC+1 (CET)
  - Summer (DST): UTC+2 (CEST)
- Vehicle registration: EBE

Firlej [ˈfirlɛi̯] is a village in the administrative district of Gmina Szczerców, within Bełchatów County, Łódź Voivodeship, in central Poland.
