= Józefina, Bełchatów County =

Józefina
- Village
- Location within Poland
- Coordinates: 51°18′48″N 19°8′9″E
- Country: Poland
- Voivodeship: Łódź
- County: Bełchatów
- Gmina: Szczerców

Józefina [juzɛˈfina] is a village in the administrative district of Gmina Szczerców, within Bełchatów County, Łódź Voivodeship, in central Poland.
