= Leśniaki, Gmina Szczerców =

Leśniaki
- Village
- Location within Poland
- Coordinates: 51°18′6″N 19°5′26″E
- Country: Poland
- Voivodeship: Łódź
- County: Bełchatów
- Gmina: Szczerców

Leśniaki [lɛɕˈɲaki] is a village in the administrative district of Gmina Szczerców, within Bełchatów County, Łódź Voivodeship, in central Poland.
