= Gałkówek-Parcela =

- Village
- Location within Poland
- Coordinates: 51°44′51″N 19°44′10″E
- Country: Poland
- Voivodeship: Łódź
- County: Łódź East
- Gmina: Koluszki

Gałkówek-Parcela [ɡau̯ˈkuvɛk parˈt͡sɛla] is a village in the administrative district of Gmina Koluszki, within Łódź East County, Łódź Voivodeship, in central Poland.
