= Lubiec =

- Village
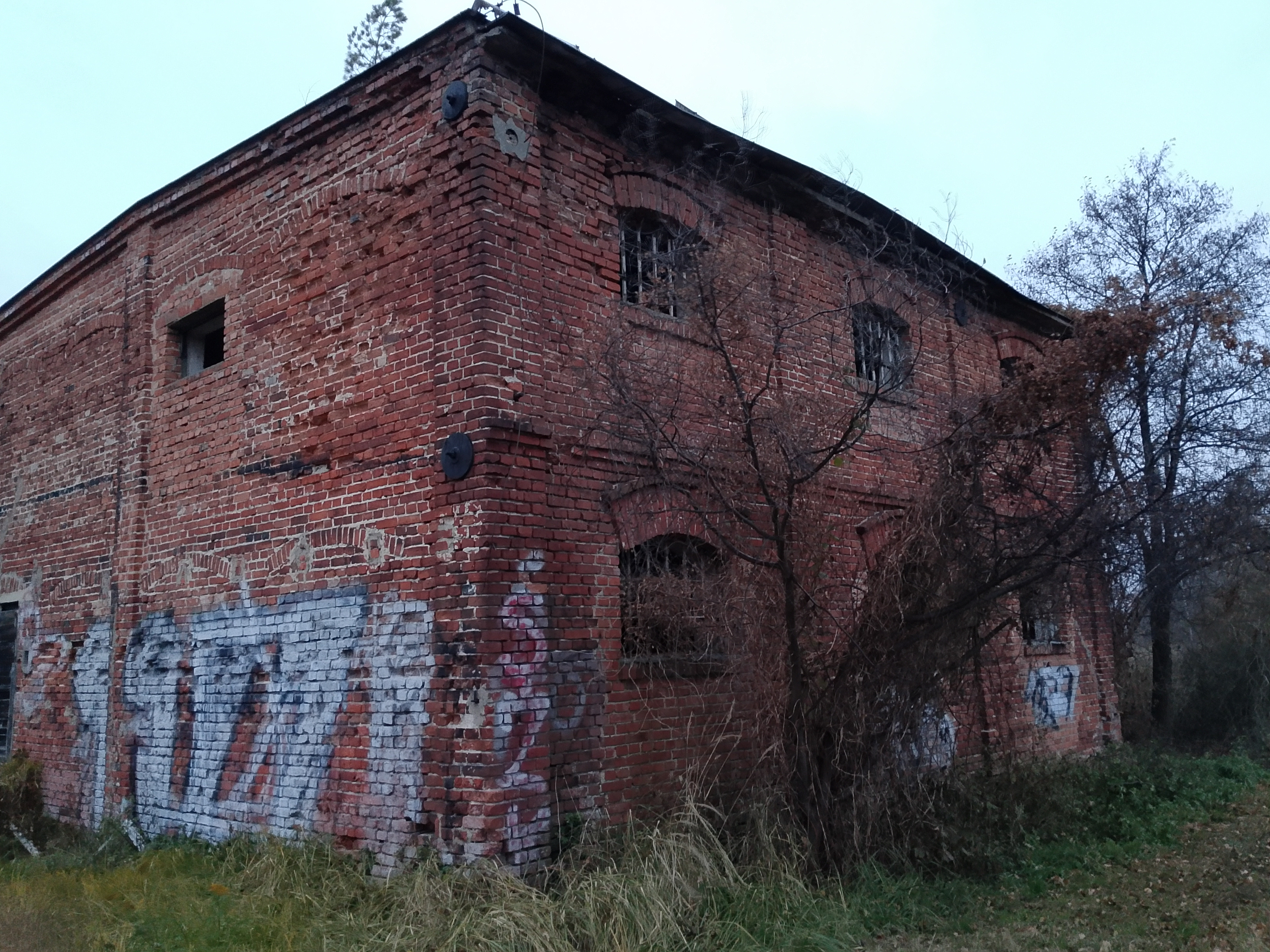

- Location within Poland
- Coordinates: 51°22′N 19°8′E
- Country: Poland
- Voivodeship: Łódź
- County: Bełchatów
- Gmina: Szczerców
- Population (approx.): 300

Lubiec [ˈlubjɛt͡s] is a village in the administrative district of Gmina Szczerców, within Bełchatów County, Łódź Voivodeship, in central Poland.

The village has an approximate population of 300.
