= Gmina Szczerców =

Gmina Szczerców Szczerców Commune
- Gmina
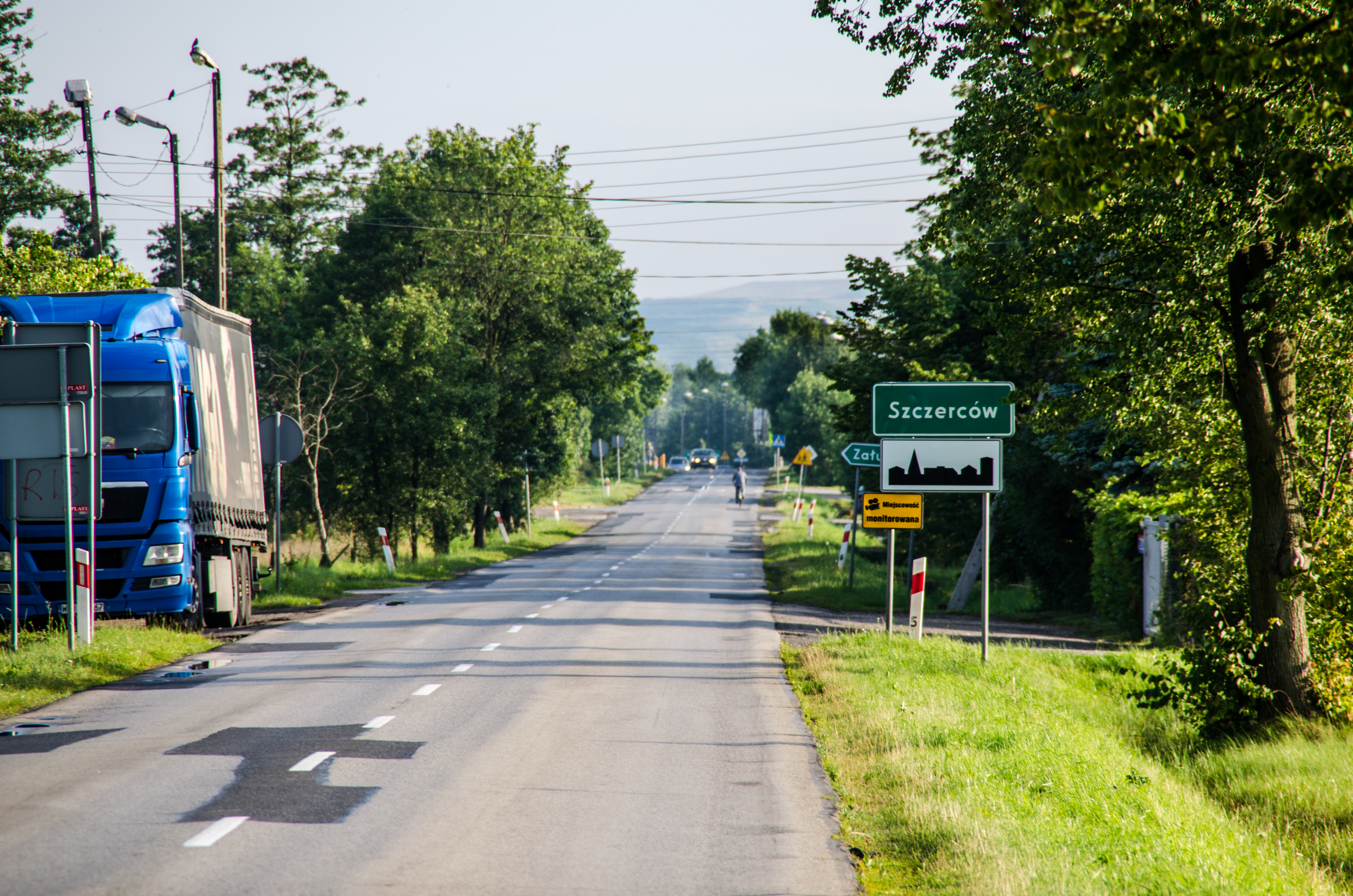

- Flag Coat of arms
- Interactive map of Gmina Szczerców
- Coordinates (Szczerców): 51°20′N 19°7′E
- Country: Poland
- Voivodeship: Łódź
- County: Bełchatów
- Seat: Szczerców

Area
  - Total: 128.91 km^{2} (49.77 sq mi)

Population (2006)
  - Total: 7,582
  - Density: 58.82/km^{2} (152.3/sq mi)
- Website: www.szczercow.pl

Gmina Szczerców is a rural gmina (administrative district) in Bełchatów County, Łódź Voivodeship, in central Poland. Its seat is the village of Szczerców, which lies approximately 18 kilometres (11 mi) west of Bełchatów and 56 km (35 mi) south-west of the regional capital Łódź.

The gmina covers an area of 128.91 square kilometres (49.8 sq mi), and as of 2006 its total population is 7,582.

== Villages ==
Gmina Szczerców contains the villages and settlements of:

- Bednarze
- Borowa
- Brzezie
- Chabielice
- Chabielice-Kolonia
- Dubie
- Dzbanki
- Firlej
- Grabek
- Grudna
- Janówka
- Józefina
- Kieruzele
- Kolonia Szczercowska
- Kościuszki
- Kozłówki
- Krzyżówki
- Kuźnica Lubiecka
- Leśniaki
- Lubiec
- Lubośnia
- Magdalenów
- Marcelów
- Młynki
- Niwy
- Osiny
- Osiny-Kolonia
- Parchliny
- Podklucze
- Podżar
- Polowa
- Puszcza
- Rudzisko
- Stanisławów Drugi
- Stanisławów Pierwszy
- Szczerców
- Szczercowska Wieś
- Szubienice
- Tatar
- Trakt Puszczański
- Żabczanka
- Zagadki
- Załuże
- Zbyszek

== Neighbouring gminas ==
Gmina Szczerców is bordered by the gminas of Kleszczów, Kluki, Rusiec, Rząśnia, Sulmierzyce, Widawa and Zelów.
