= Lubośnia =

- Village
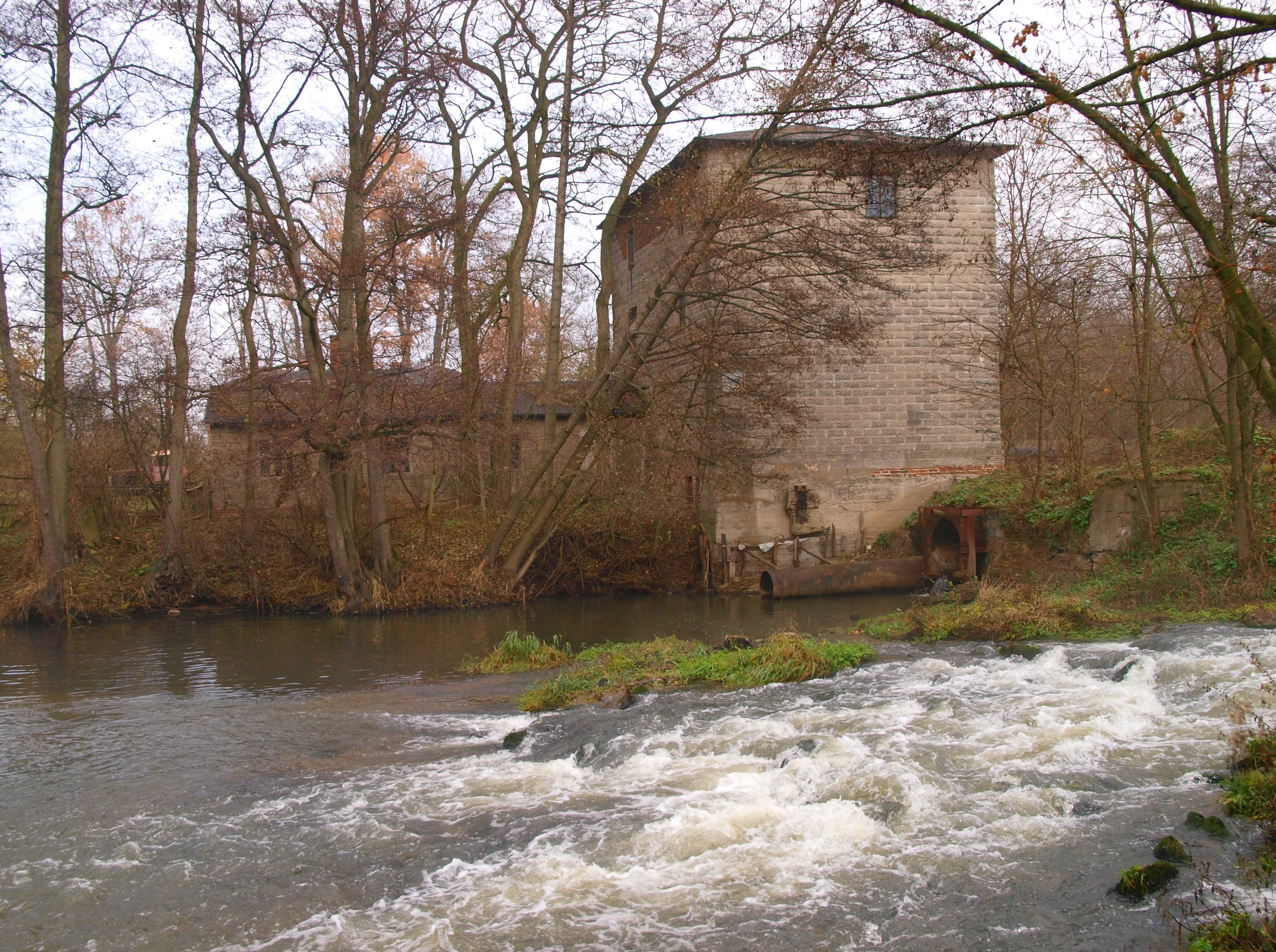

- Location within Poland
- Coordinates: 51°18′17″N 19°9′12″E
- Country: Poland
- Voivodeship: Łódź
- County: Bełchatów
- Gmina: Szczerców

Lubośnia [luˈbɔɕɲa] is a village in the administrative district of Gmina Szczerców, within Bełchatów County, Łódź Voivodeship, in central Poland.
