= Zygmuntów, Łódź East County =

Zygmuntów
- Village
- Location within Poland
- Coordinates: 51°45′05″N 19°50′41″E
- Country: Poland
- Voivodeship: Łódź
- County: Łódź East
- Gmina: Koluszki

Zygmuntów [zɨɡˈmuntuf] is a village in the administrative district of Gmina Koluszki, within Łódź East County, Łódź Voivodeship, in central Poland.
