= Leosin =

- Village
- Location within Poland
- Coordinates: 51°44′12″N 19°53′35″E
- Country: Poland
- Voivodeship: Łódź
- County: Łódź East
- Gmina: Koluszki
- Population: 80

Leosin [lɛˈɔɕin] is a village in the administrative district of Gmina Koluszki, within Łódź East County, Łódź Voivodeship, in central Poland.
