= Janówka, Bełchatów County =

Janówka
- Village
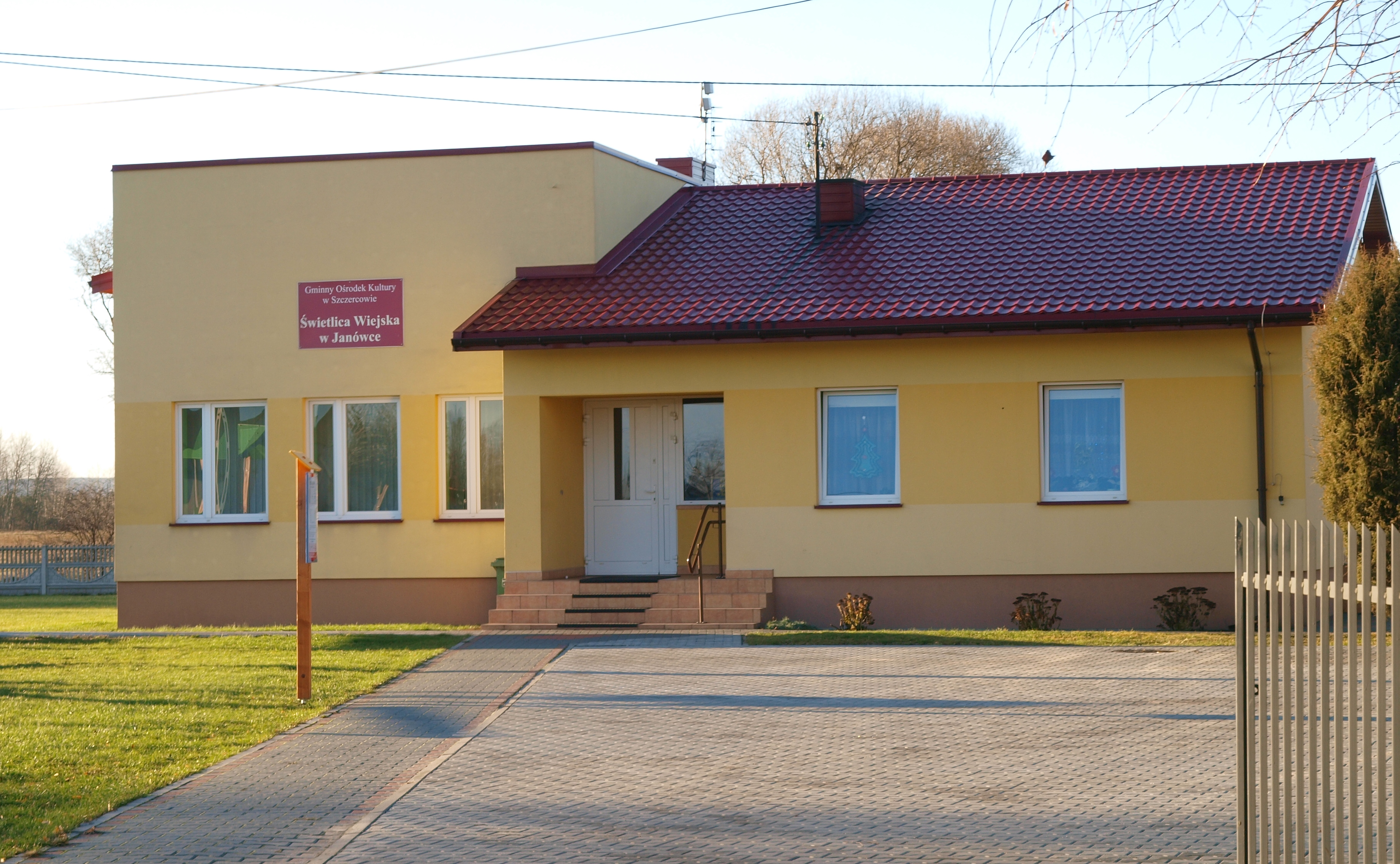

- Location within Poland
- Coordinates: 51°16′37″N 19°10′11″E
- Country: Poland
- Voivodeship: Łódź
- County: Bełchatów
- Gmina: Szczerców

Janówka [jaˈnufka] is a village in the administrative district of Gmina Szczerców, within Bełchatów County, Łódź Voivodeship, in central Poland.
