= Osiny, Bełchatów County =

Osiny
- Village
- Location within Poland
- Coordinates: 51°16′38″N 19°11′25″E
- Country: Poland
- Voivodeship: Łódź
- County: Bełchatów
- Gmina: Szczerców
- Population (approx.): 300

Osiny [ɔˈɕinɨ] is a village in the administrative district of Gmina Szczerców, within Bełchatów County, Łódź Voivodeship, in central Poland.

The village has an approximate population of 300.
