= Jeziorko, Łódź East County =

Jeziorko
- Village
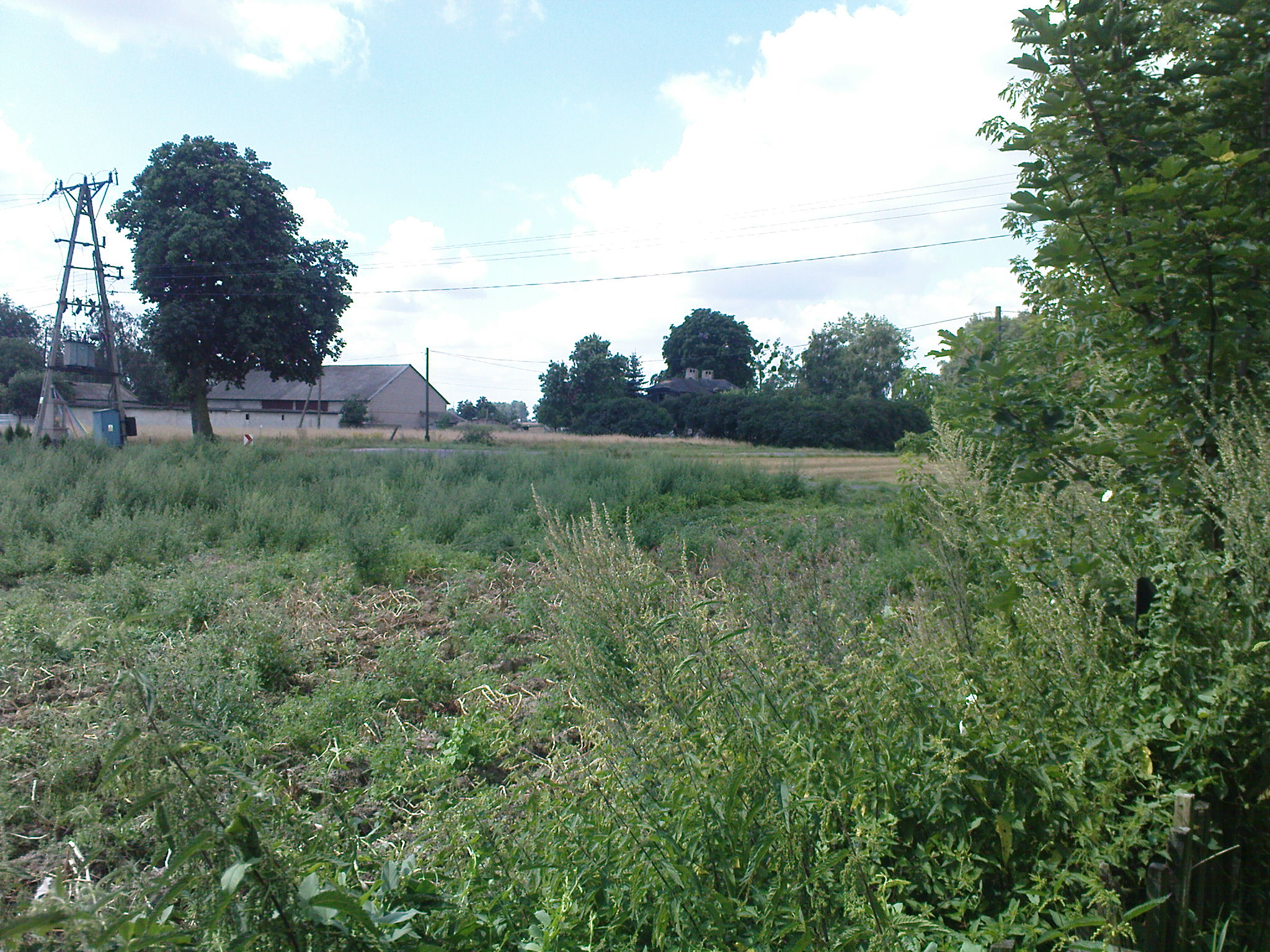

- Location within Poland
- Coordinates: 51°46′N 19°51′E
- Country: Poland
- Voivodeship: Łódź
- County: Łódź East
- Gmina: Koluszki

Jeziorko [jɛˈʑɔrkɔ] is a village in the administrative district of Gmina Koluszki, within Łódź East County, Łódź Voivodeship, in central Poland.
