= Kieruzele =

- Village
- Location within Poland
- Coordinates: 51°16′19″N 19°7′41″E
- Country: Poland
- Voivodeship: Łódź
- County: Bełchatów
- Gmina: Szczerców

Kieruzele [kʲɛruˈzɛlɛ] is a village in the administrative district of Gmina Szczerców, within Bełchatów County, Łódź Voivodeship, in central Poland.
