= Gmina Koluszki =

Gmina Koluszki Koluszki Commune
- Gmina
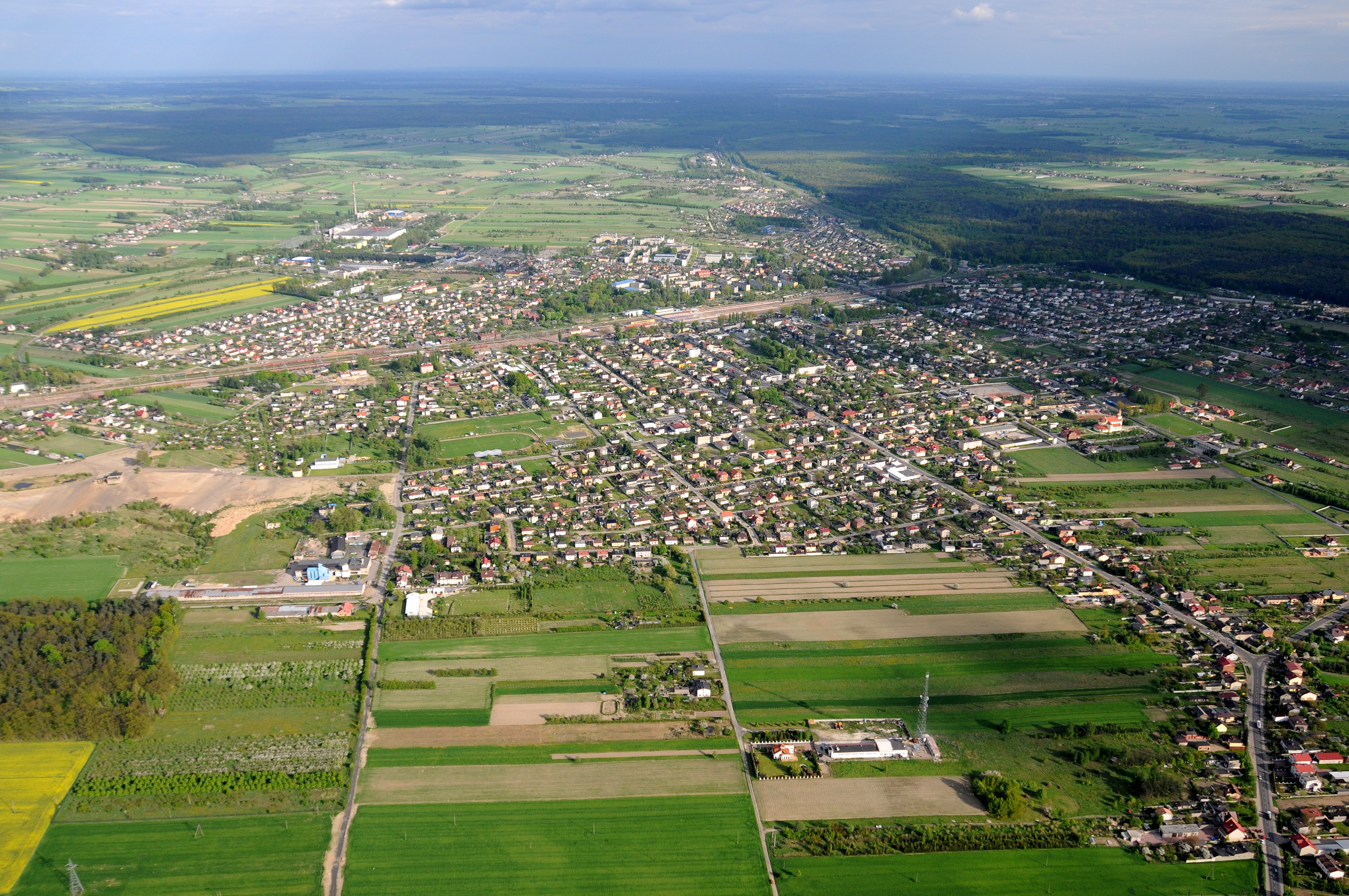

- Flag Coat of arms
- Interactive map of Gmina Koluszki
- Coordinates (Koluszki): 51°45′N 19°48′E
- Country: Poland
- Voivodeship: Łódź
- County: Łódź East County
- Seat: Koluszki

Area
  - Total: 157.18 km^{2} (60.69 sq mi)

Population (2006)
  - Total: 22,985
  - Density: 146.23/km^{2} (378.74/sq mi)
  - Urban: 13,407
  - Rural: 9,578
- Time zone: UTC+1 (CET)
  - Summer (DST): UTC+2 (CEST)
- Website: www.koluszki.net

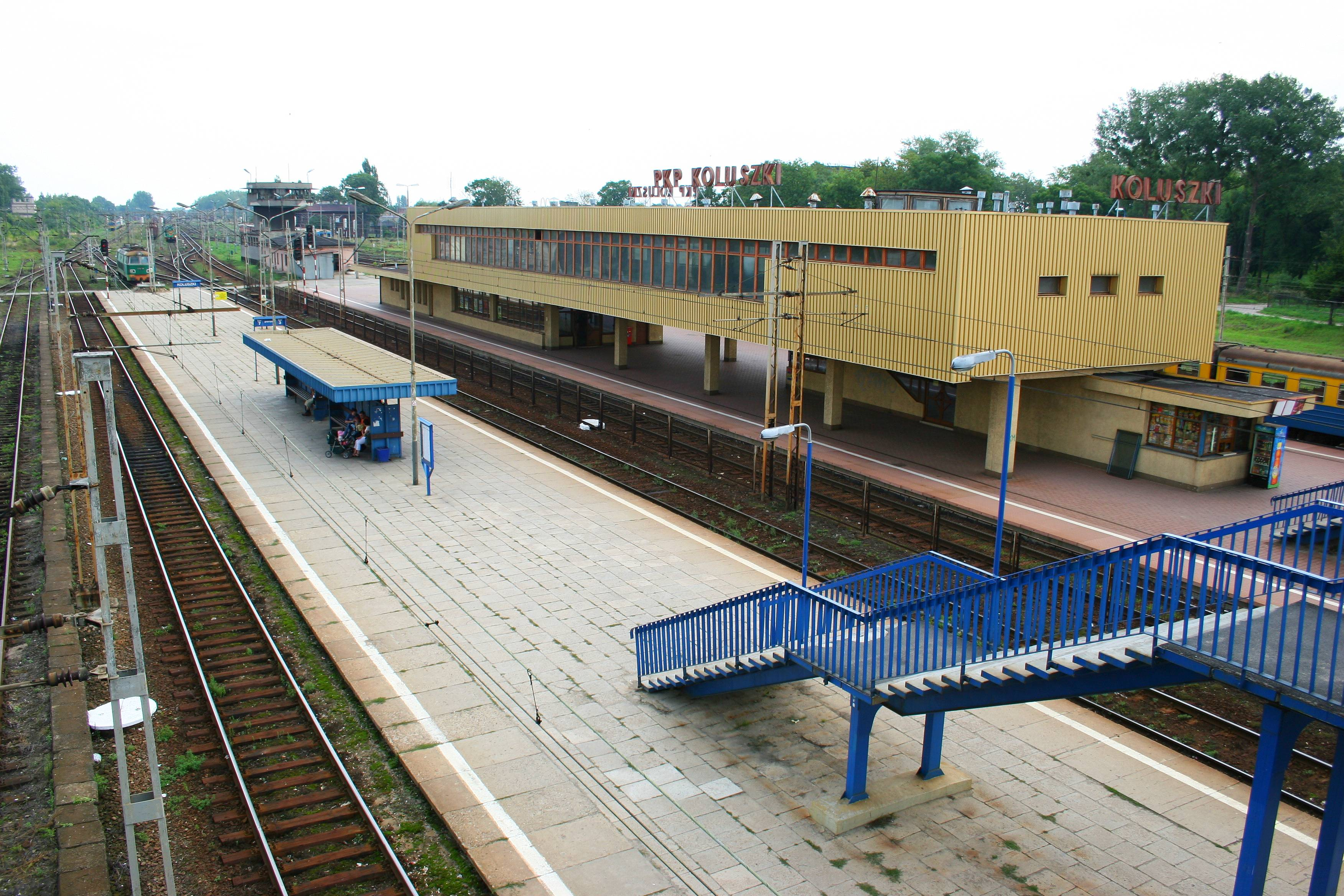
Koluszki train station

Gmina Koluszki is an urban-rural gmina (administrative district) in Łódź East County, Łódź Voivodeship, in central Poland. Its seat is the town of Koluszki, which lies approximately 24 kilometres (15 mi) east of the regional capital Łódź.

The gmina covers an area of 157.18 square kilometres (60.7 sq mi), and as of 2006 its total population is 22,985 (out of which the population of Koluszki amounts to 13,407, and the population of the rural part of the gmina is 9,578).

== Villages ==
Apart from the town of Koluszki, Gmina Koluszki contains the villages and settlements of:

- Będzelin
- Borowa
- Długie
- Erazmów
- Felicjanów
- Gałków Duży
- Gałków Mały
- Gałkówek-Parcela
- Jeziorko
- Kaletnik
- Katarzynów
- Kazimierzów
- Leosin
- Lisowice
- Nowy Redzeń
- Przanowice
- Regny
- Różyca
- Słotwiny
- Stary Redzeń
- Stefanów
- Świny
- Turobowice
- Wierzchy
- Żakowice
- Zygmuntów

== Neighbouring gminas ==
Gmina Koluszki is bordered by the gminas of Andrespol, Brójce, Brzeziny, Budziszewice, Jeżów, Rogów, Rokiciny, Ujazd and Żelechlinek.
