= Wierzchy, Łódź East County =

Wierzchy
- Village
- Location within Poland
- Coordinates: 51°46′10″N 19°54′3″E
- Country: Poland
- Voivodeship: Łódź
- County: Łódź East
- Gmina: Koluszki

Wierzchy [ˈvjɛʂxɨ] is a village in the administrative district of Gmina Koluszki, within Łódź East County, Łódź Voivodeship, in central Poland.
