= Będzelin =

- Village
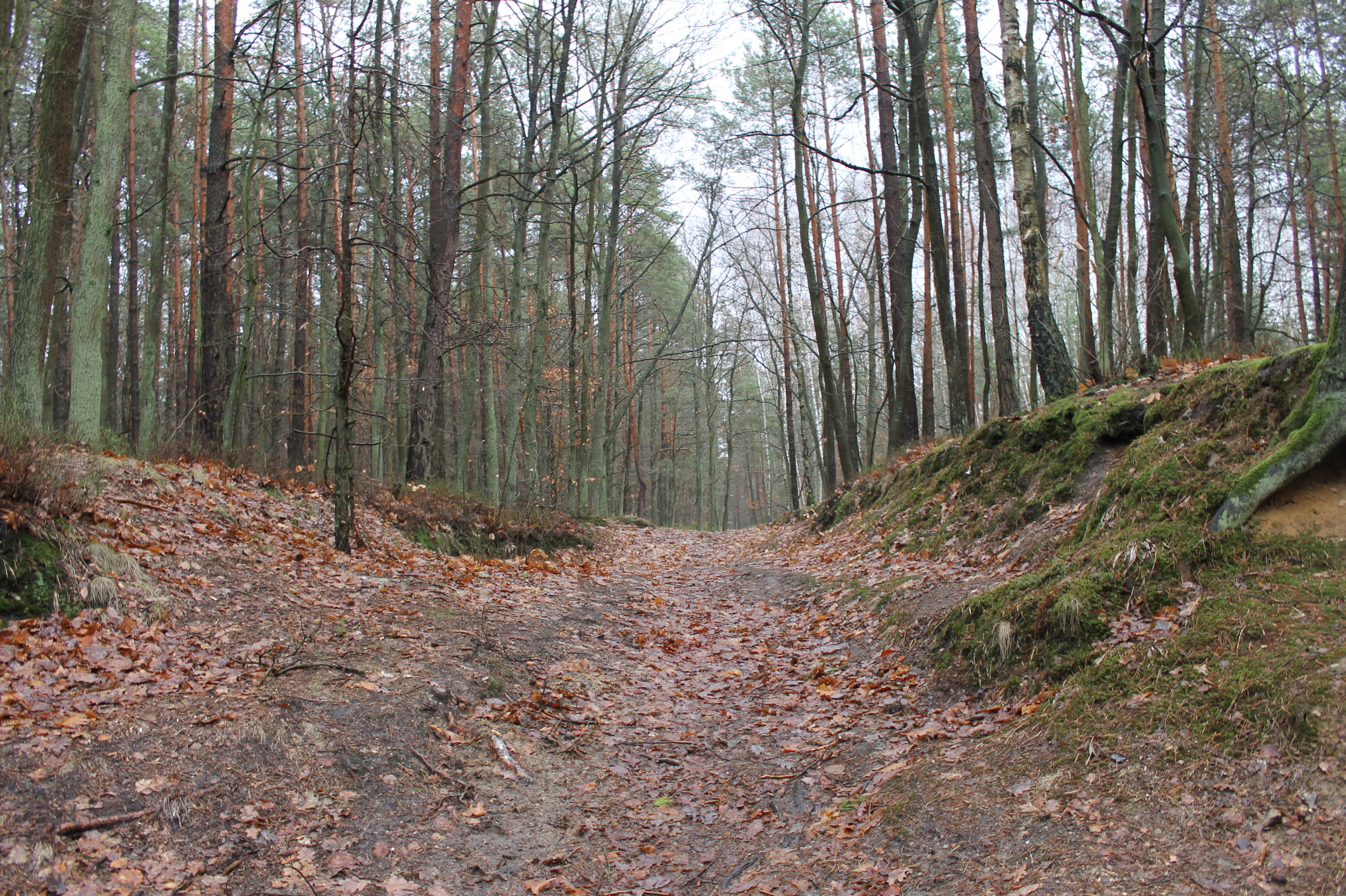
- Będzelin forest

- Location within Poland
- Coordinates: 51°43′N 19°49′E
- Country: Poland
- Voivodeship: Łódź
- County: Łódź East
- Gmina: Koluszki

Będzelin [bɛnˈd͡zɛlin] is a village in the administrative district of Gmina Koluszki, within Łódź East County, Łódź Voivodeship, in central Poland. The population of the village is approximately 430 people.

A public elementary school and a fire station operate in the village.
