= Stefanów, Gmina Koluszki =

Stefanów
- Village
- Location within Poland
- Coordinates: 51°44′36″N 19°51′53″E
- Country: Poland
- Voivodeship: Łódź
- County: Łódź East
- Gmina: Koluszki

Stefanów [stɛˈfanuf] is a village in the administrative district of Gmina Koluszki, within Łódź East County, Łódź Voivodeship, in central Poland.
