= Regny, Łódź Voivodeship =

Regny
- Village
- Location within Poland
- Coordinates: 51°42′N 19°54′E
- Country: Poland
- Voivodeship: Łódź
- County: Łódź East
- Gmina: Koluszki
- Population: 530

Regny [ˈrɛɡnɨ] is a village in the administrative district of Gmina Koluszki, within Łódź East County, Łódź Voivodeship, in central Poland.
