= Gałków Mały =

- Village
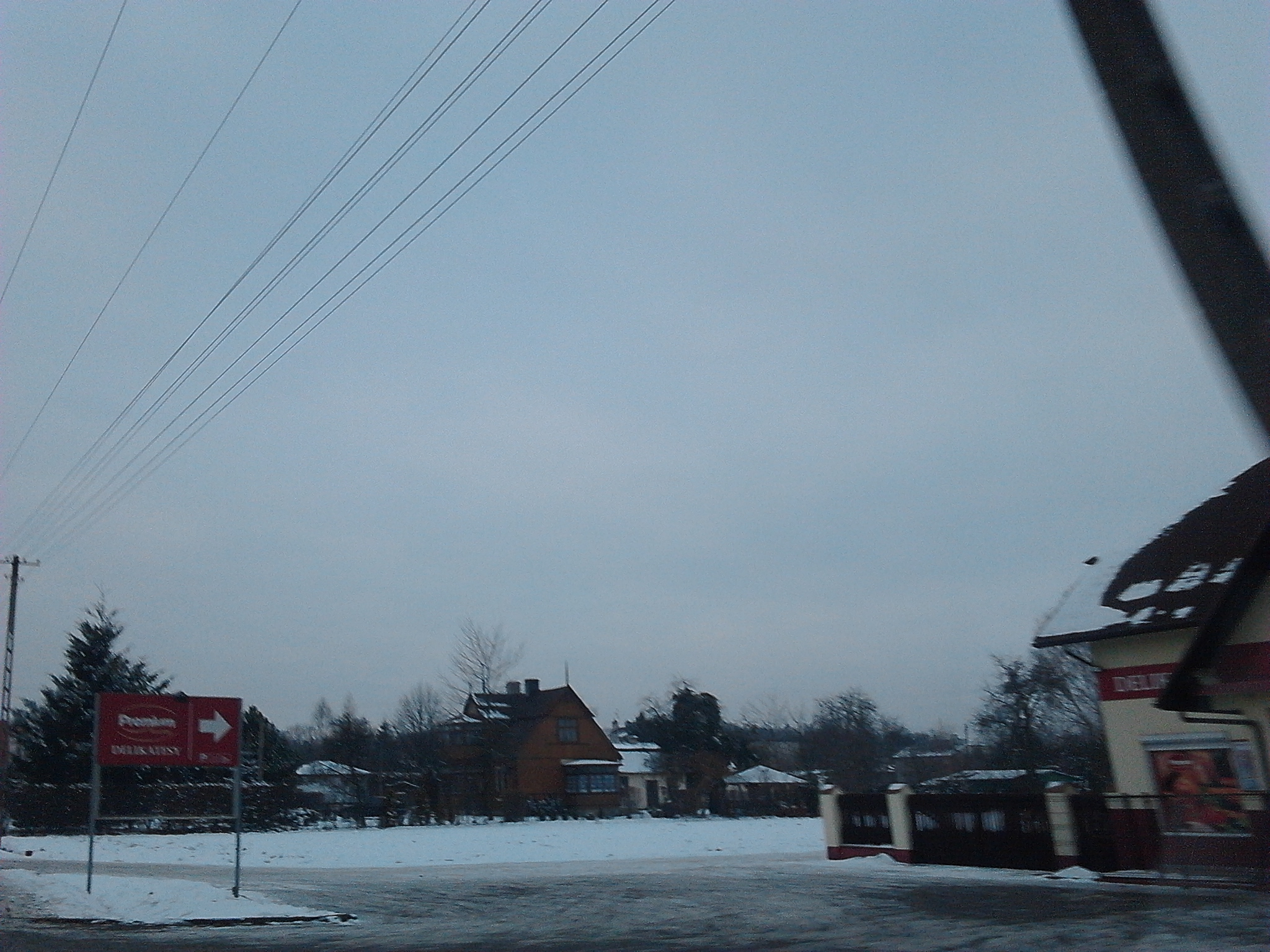

- Location within Poland
- Coordinates: 51°44′N 19°44′E
- Country: Poland
- Voivodeship: Łódź
- County: Łódź East
- Gmina: Koluszki
- Population: 1,900

Gałków Mały [ˈɡau̯kuf ˈmawɨ] is a village in the administrative district of Gmina Koluszki, within Łódź East County, Łódź Voivodeship, in central Poland.
