= Szubienice =

- Village
- Location within Poland
- Coordinates: 51°19′23″N 19°8′37″E
- Country: Poland
- Voivodeship: Łódź
- County: Bełchatów
- Gmina: Szczerców

Szubienice [ʂubjɛˈnit͡sɛ] is a village in the administrative district of Gmina Szczerców, within Bełchatów County, Łódź Voivodeship, in central Poland.
