= Borov (disambiguation) =

Borov is a village in Slovakia.

Borov may also refer to:

- Borov Kamak, a waterfall in Bulgaria
- Ilčo Borov (born 1966), a Macedonian football striker

== See also ==
- Borova (disambiguation)
