= Stary Redzeń =

- Village
- Location within Poland
- Coordinates: 51°43′N 19°53′E
- Country: Poland
- Voivodeship: Łódź
- County: Łódź East
- Gmina: Koluszki

Stary Redzeń [ˈstarɨ ˈrɛd͡zɛɲ] is a village in the administrative district of Gmina Koluszki, within Łódź East County, Łódź Voivodeship, in central Poland.
