= Turobowice, Łódź East County =

Turobowice
- Village
- Location within Poland
- Coordinates: 51°45′6″N 19°53′5″E
- Country: Poland
- Voivodeship: Łódź
- County: Łódź East
- Gmina: Koluszki

Turobowice [turɔbɔˈvit͡sɛ] is a village in the administrative district of Gmina Koluszki, within Łódź East County, Łódź Voivodeship, in central Poland.
