= Niwy, Bełchatów County =

Niwy
- Village
- Location within Poland
- Coordinates: 51°18′43″N 19°7′16″E
- Country: Poland
- Voivodeship: Łódź
- County: Bełchatów
- Gmina: Szczerców

Niwy [ˈnivɨ] is a village in the administrative district of Gmina Szczerców, within Bełchatów County, Łódź Voivodeship, in central Poland.
