= Podżar =

- Village
- Location within Poland
- Coordinates: 51°18′27″N 19°10′6″E
- Country: Poland
- Voivodeship: Łódź
- County: Bełchatów
- Gmina: Szczerców

Podżar [ˈpɔd͡ʐar] is a village in the administrative district of Gmina Szczerców, within Bełchatów County, Łódź Voivodeship, in central Poland.
