= Chabielice =

- Village
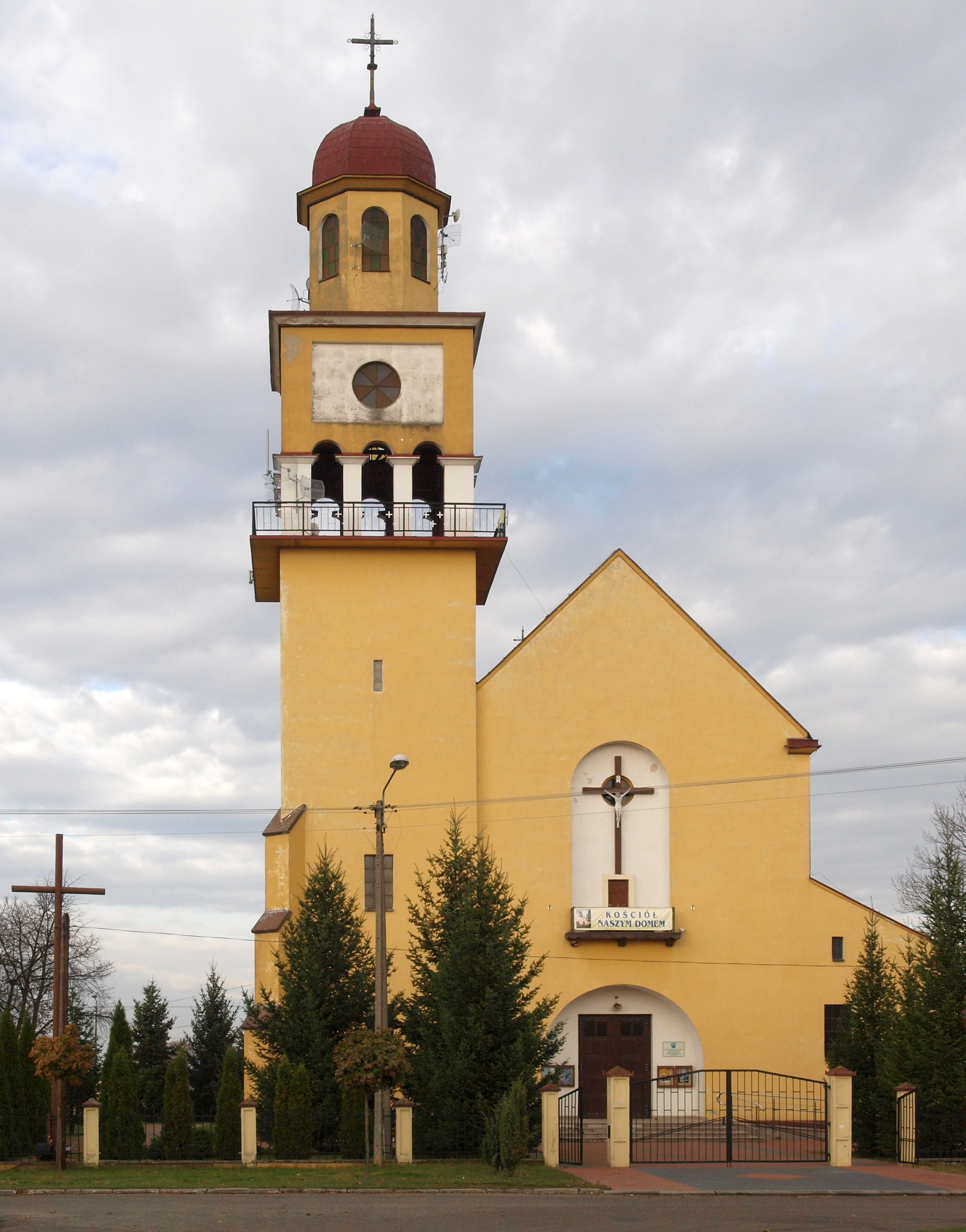
- Church of Saint Michael

- Location within Poland
- Coordinates: 51°15′49″N 19°6′59″E
- Country: Poland
- Voivodeship: Łódź
- County: Bełchatów
- Gmina: Szczerców

Population (approx.)
  - Total: 500

Chabielice [xabjɛˈlit͡sɛ] is a village in the administrative district of Gmina Szczerców, within Bełchatów County, Łódź Voivodeship, in central Poland.

The village has an approximate population of 500.
