= Tatar, Łódź Voivodeship =

Tatar
- Village
- Location within Poland
- Coordinates: 51°17′N 19°9′E
- Country: Poland
- Voivodeship: Łódź
- County: Bełchatów
- Gmina: Szczerców

Tatar [ˈtatar] is a village in the administrative district of Gmina Szczerców, within Bełchatów County, Łódź Voivodeship, in central Poland.
