= Kozłówki, Łódź Voivodeship =

Kozłówki
- Village
- Location within Poland
- Coordinates: 51°19′21″N 19°6′35″E
- Country: Poland
- Voivodeship: Łódź
- County: Bełchatów
- Gmina: Szczerców

Kozłówki [kɔˈzwufki] is a village in the administrative district of Gmina Szczerców, within Bełchatów County, Łódź Voivodeship, in central Poland.
