= Kolonia Szczercowska =

- Village
- Location within Poland
- Coordinates: 51°21′2″N 19°5′0″E
- Country: Poland
- Voivodeship: Łódź
- County: Bełchatów
- Gmina: Szczerców

Kolonia Szczercowska [kɔˈlɔɲa ʂt͡ʂɛrˈt͡sɔfska] is a village in the administrative district of Gmina Szczerców, within Bełchatów County, Łódź Voivodeship, in central Poland.
