= Magdalenów, Bełchatów County =

Magdalenów
- Village
- Location within Poland
- Coordinates: 51°21′33″N 19°9′19″E
- Country: Poland
- Voivodeship: Łódź
- County: Bełchatów
- Gmina: Szczerców

Magdalenów [maɡdaˈlɛnuf] is a village in the administrative district of Gmina Szczerców, within Bełchatów County, Łódź Voivodeship, in central Poland.
