= Dzbanki =

- Village
- Location within Poland
- Coordinates: 51°20′23″N 19°4′18″E
- Country: Poland
- Voivodeship: Łódź
- County: Bełchatów
- Gmina: Szczerców

Dzbanki [ˈd͡zbanki] is a village in the administrative district of Gmina Szczerców, within Bełchatów County, Łódź Voivodeship, in central Poland.
