= Rudzisko, Łódź Voivodeship =

Rudzisko
- Village
- Location within Poland
- Coordinates: 51°21′57″N 19°6′18″E
- Country: Poland
- Voivodeship: Łódź
- County: Bełchatów
- Gmina: Szczerców

Rudzisko [ruˈd͡ʑiskɔ] is a village in the administrative district of Gmina Szczerców, in Bełchatów County, Łódź Voivodeship, in central Poland.

== Climate ==
The climate is moderately continental with warm summers and moderately cold winters. The warmest month of the year is July (March) and the coldest is January (February).
