= Lisowice, Łódź East County =

Lisowice
- Village
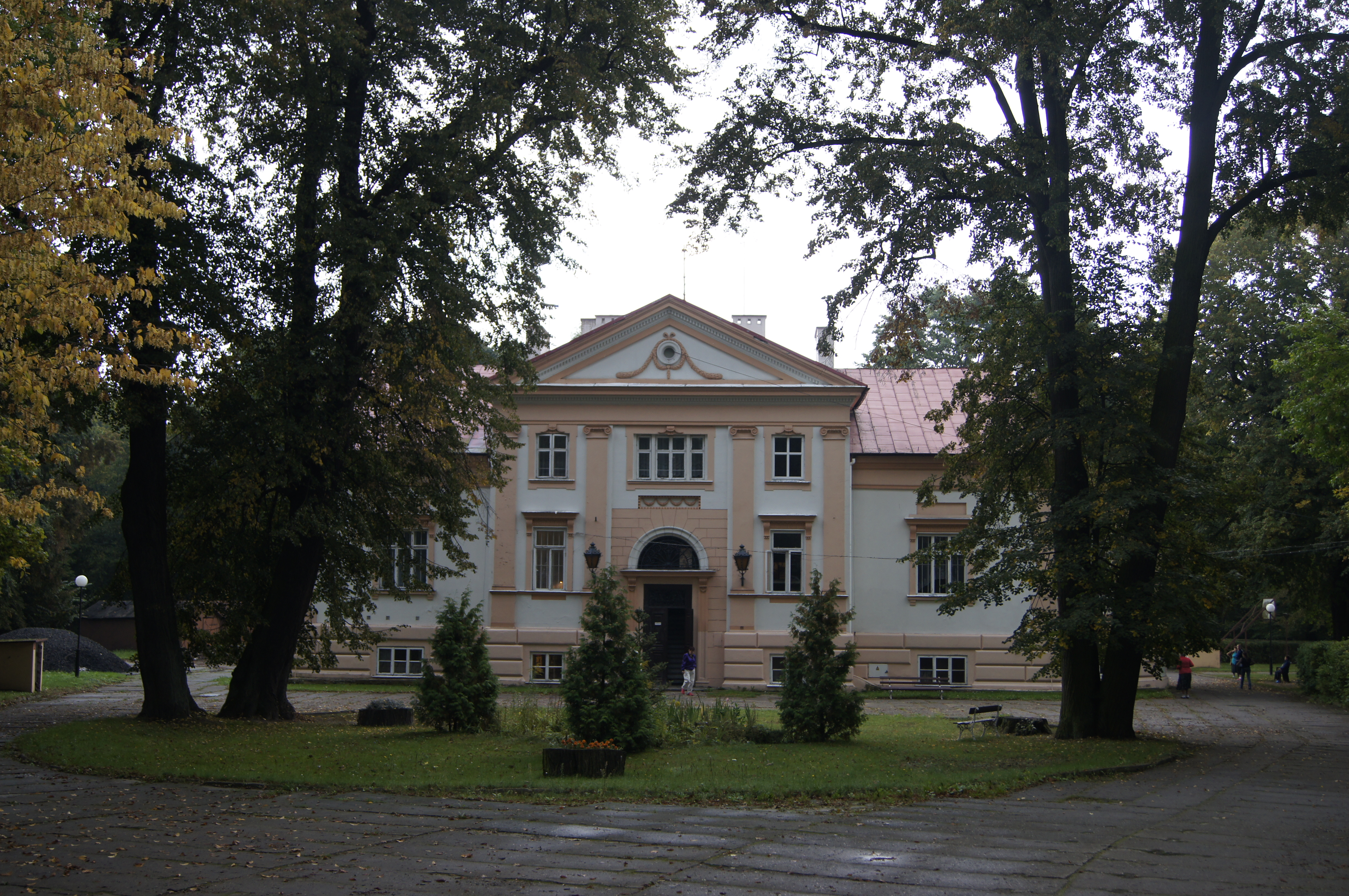

- Location within Poland
- Coordinates: 51°46′35″N 19°48′16″E
- Country: Poland
- Voivodeship: Łódź
- County: Łódź East
- Gmina: Koluszki

Lisowice [lisɔˈvit͡sɛ] is a village in the administrative district of Gmina Koluszki, within Łódź East County, Łódź Voivodeship, in central Poland.
