= Chabielice-Kolonia =

- Village
- Location within Poland
- Coordinates: 51°16′32″N 19°6′30″E
- Country: Poland
- Voivodeship: Łódź
- County: Bełchatów
- Gmina: Szczerców
- Population (approx.): 200

Chabielice-Kolonia [xabjɛˈlit͡sɛ kɔˈlɔɲa] is a village in the administrative district of Gmina Szczerców, within Bełchatów County, Łódź Voivodeship, in central Poland.

The village has an approximate population of 200.
