= Stanisławów Drugi, Łódź Voivodeship =

Stanisławów Drugi
- Village
- Location within Poland
- Coordinates: 51°18′N 19°8′E
- Country: Poland
- Voivodeship: Łódź
- County: Bełchatów
- Gmina: Szczerców
- Population: 148

Stanisławów Drugi [staniˈswavuf ˈdruɡi] is a village in the administrative district of Gmina Szczerców, within Bełchatów County, Łódź Voivodeship, in central Poland.
