= Brzezie, Gmina Szczerców =

Brzezie
- Village
- Location within Poland
- Coordinates: 51°18′45″N 19°6′26″E
- Country: Poland
- Voivodeship: Łódź
- County: Bełchatów
- Gmina: Szczerców
- Population: 203

Brzezie [ˈbʐɛʑɛ] is a village in the administrative district of Gmina Szczerców, within Bełchatów County, Łódź Voivodeship, in central Poland.
