= Zagadki =

- Village
- Location within Poland
- Coordinates: 51°20′45″N 19°7′47″E
- Country: Poland
- Voivodeship: Łódź
- County: Bełchatów
- Gmina: Szczerców
- Population: 100

Zagadki [zaˈɡatki] is a village in the administrative district of Gmina Szczerców, within Bełchatów County, Łódź Voivodeship, in central Poland.
