= Kaletnik, Łódź Voivodeship =

Kaletnik
- Village
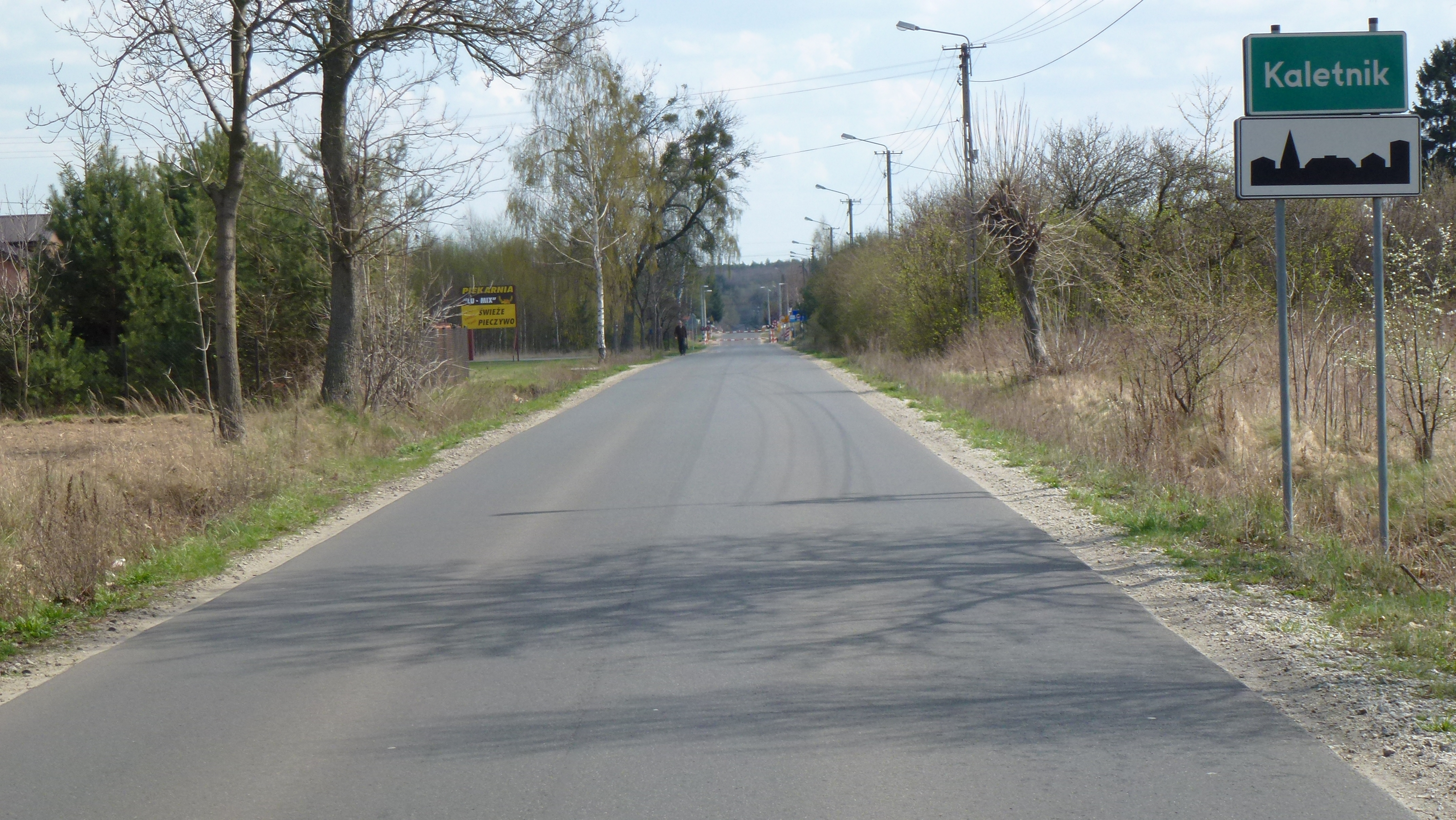

- Location within Poland
- Coordinates: 51°43′N 19°47′E
- Country: Poland
- Voivodeship: Łódź
- County: Łódź East
- Gmina: Koluszki

Kaletnik [kaˈlɛtnik] is a village in the administrative district of Gmina Koluszki, within Łódź East County, Łódź Voivodeship, in central Poland.
