= Różyca, Łódź Voivodeship =

Różyca
- Village
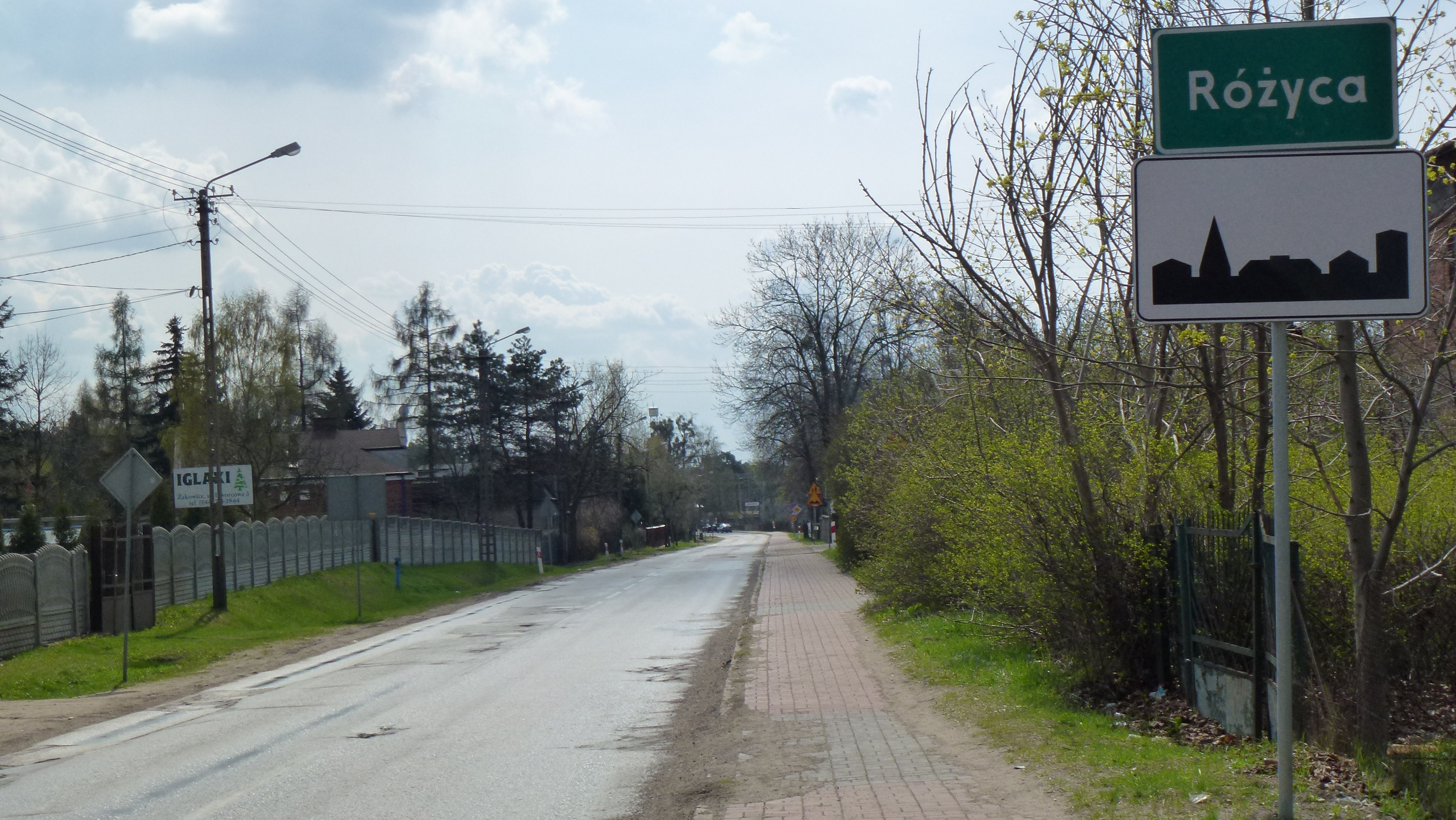

- Location within Poland
- Coordinates: 51°44′N 19°47′E
- Country: Poland
- Voivodeship: Łódź
- County: Łódź East
- Gmina: Koluszki
- Population: 770

Różyca [ruˈʐɨt͡sa] is a village in the administrative district of Gmina Koluszki in Łódź East County, Łódź Voivodeship in central Poland. It is approximately 3 km (2 mi) southwest of Koluszki and 23 km (14 mi) east of the regional capital Łódź.
