= Żabczanka =

- Village
- Location within Poland
- Coordinates: 51°18′48″N 19°9′7″E
- Country: Poland
- Voivodeship: Łódź
- County: Bełchatów
- Gmina: Szczerców
- Population: 60

Żabczanka [ʐapˈt͡ʂaŋka] is a village in the administrative district of Gmina Szczerców, within Bełchatów County, Łódź Voivodeship, in central Poland.
