= Borowy =

Borowy (Polish pronunciation: [bɔˈrɔvɨ]) may refer to the following:

== Places ==
- Borowy Las, a village in Pomeranian Voivodeship, Poland
- Borowy Młyn, various villages in Poland
- Kamieńczyk-Borowy, a village in Masovian Voivodeship, Poland
- Sojczyn Borowy, a village in Podlaskie Voivodeship, Poland
- Szczawin Borowy-Wieś, a village in Masovian Voivodeship, Poland
- Złaków Borowy, a village in Łódź Voivodeship, Poland

== Other ==
- Hank Borowy (1916–2004), an American baseball player
- Borowy, a Polish name for the forest-dwelling spirit Leshy

== See also ==
- Borovy
- Borovoy
