= Trakt Puszczański =

- Village
- Location within Poland
- Coordinates: 51°19′N 19°8′E
- Country: Poland
- Voivodeship: Łódź
- County: Bełchatów
- Gmina: Szczerców

Trakt Puszczański [ˈtrakt puʂˈt͡ʂaɲski] is a village in the administrative district of Gmina Szczerców, within Bełchatów County, Łódź Voivodeship, in central Poland.
