= Bednarze, Łódź Voivodeship =

Bednarze
- Village
- Location within Poland
- Coordinates: 51°18′26″N 19°3′57″E
- Country: Poland
- Voivodeship: Łódź
- County: Bełchatów
- Gmina: Szczerców

Bednarze [bɛdˈnaʐɛ] is a village in the administrative district of Gmina Szczerców, within Bełchatów County, Łódź Voivodeship, in central Poland.
