= Puszcza, Łódź Voivodeship =

Puszcza
- Village
- Location within Poland
- Coordinates: 51°17′44″N 19°9′31″E
- Country: Poland
- Voivodeship: Łódź
- County: Bełchatów
- Gmina: Szczerców

Puszcza [ˈpuʂt͡ʂa] is a village in the administrative district of Gmina Szczerców, within Bełchatów County, Łódź Voivodeship, in central Poland.
