= Borová (Svitavy District) =

- Municipality
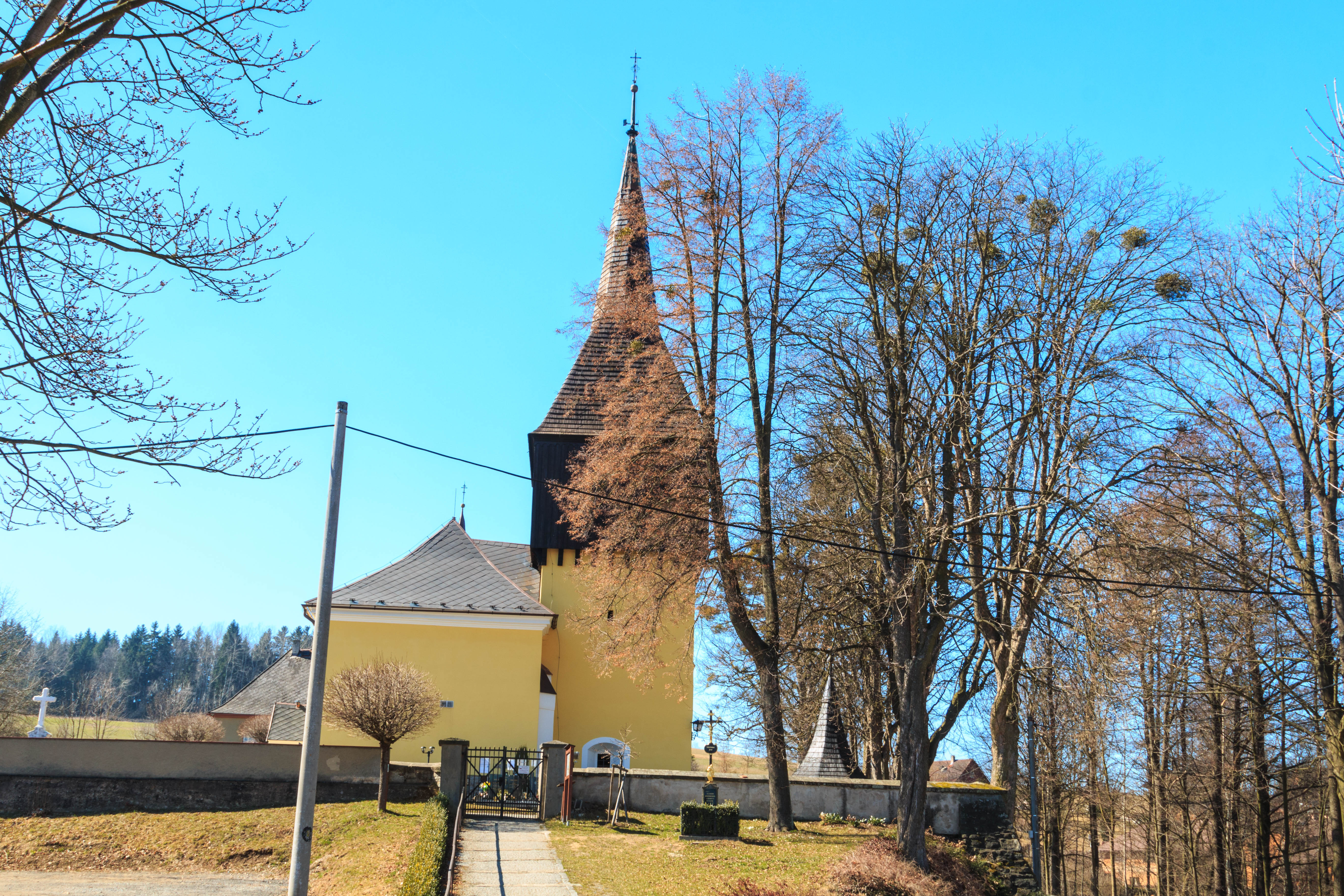
- Church of Saint Margaret

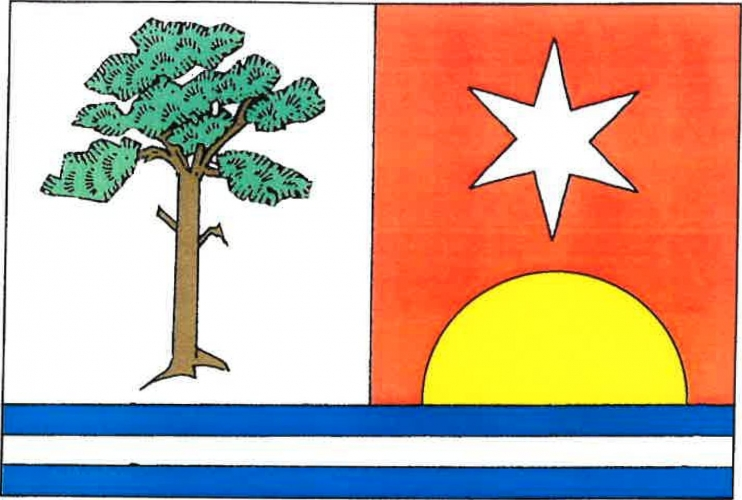
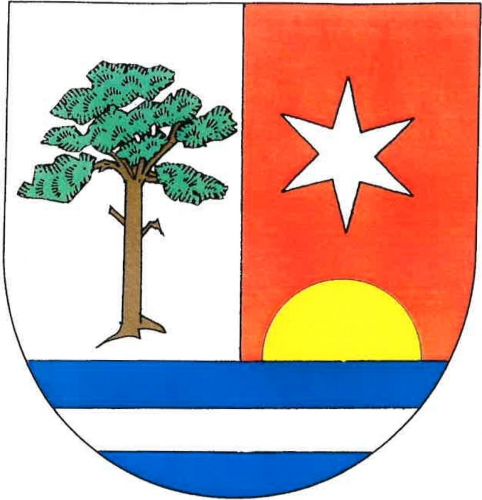
- Flag Coat of arms

- Location in the Czech Republic
- Coordinates: 49°44′30″N 16°9′44″E
- Country: Czech Republic
- Region: Pardubice
- District: Svitavy
- First mentioned: 1349

Area
  - Total: 12.99 km^{2} (5.02 sq mi)
- Elevation: 615 m (2,018 ft)

Population (2026-01-01)
  - Total: 1,041
  - Density: 80.14/km^{2} (207.6/sq mi)
- Time zone: UTC+1 (CET)
  - Summer (DST): UTC+2 (CEST)
- Postal code: 569 82
- Website: www.borova.cz

Borová is a municipality and village in Svitavy District in the Pardubice Region of the Czech Republic. It has about 1,000 inhabitants.

== Etymology ==
The name Borová is an adjective derived from the Czech words borovice ('pine') and bor ('pine forest'). The village was most likely founded near a pine forest or in a pine forest.

== Geography ==
Borová is located about 22 kilometres (14 mi) west of Svitavy and 42 km (26 mi) southeast of Pardubice. It lies in the Upper Svratka Highlands. The highest point is near the top of the hill Betlémský kopec at 740 m (2,430 ft) above sea level. The stream Černý potok flows through the municipality.

== History ==
The first written mention of Borová is from 1349. During feudal times, most of the village was owned by the town of Polička, only part of the village belonged to the Rychmburk estate. Due to the fire in the archives in Polička in 1845, the detailed history of the village is unknown.

== Demographics ==
Historical population

Year	Pop.	±%
1869	1,400	—
1880	1,381	−1.4%
1890	1,313	−4.9%
1900	1,295	−1.4%
1910	1,257	−2.9%

Year	Pop.	±%
1921	1,248	−0.7%
1930	1,611	+29.1%
1950	894	−44.5%
1961	879	−1.7%
1970	846	−3.8%

Year	Pop.	±%
1980	846	+0.0%
1991	900	+6.4%
2001	922	+2.4%
2011	968	+5.0%
2021	997	+3.0%

Source: Censuses

== Transport ==
The I/34 road (the section from Svitavy to Havlíčkův Brod) runs through the municipality.

Borová is located on the railway line Česká Třebová–Skuteč. The municipality is served by two train stops: Borová u Poličky and Borová u Poličky zastávka.

== Sights ==
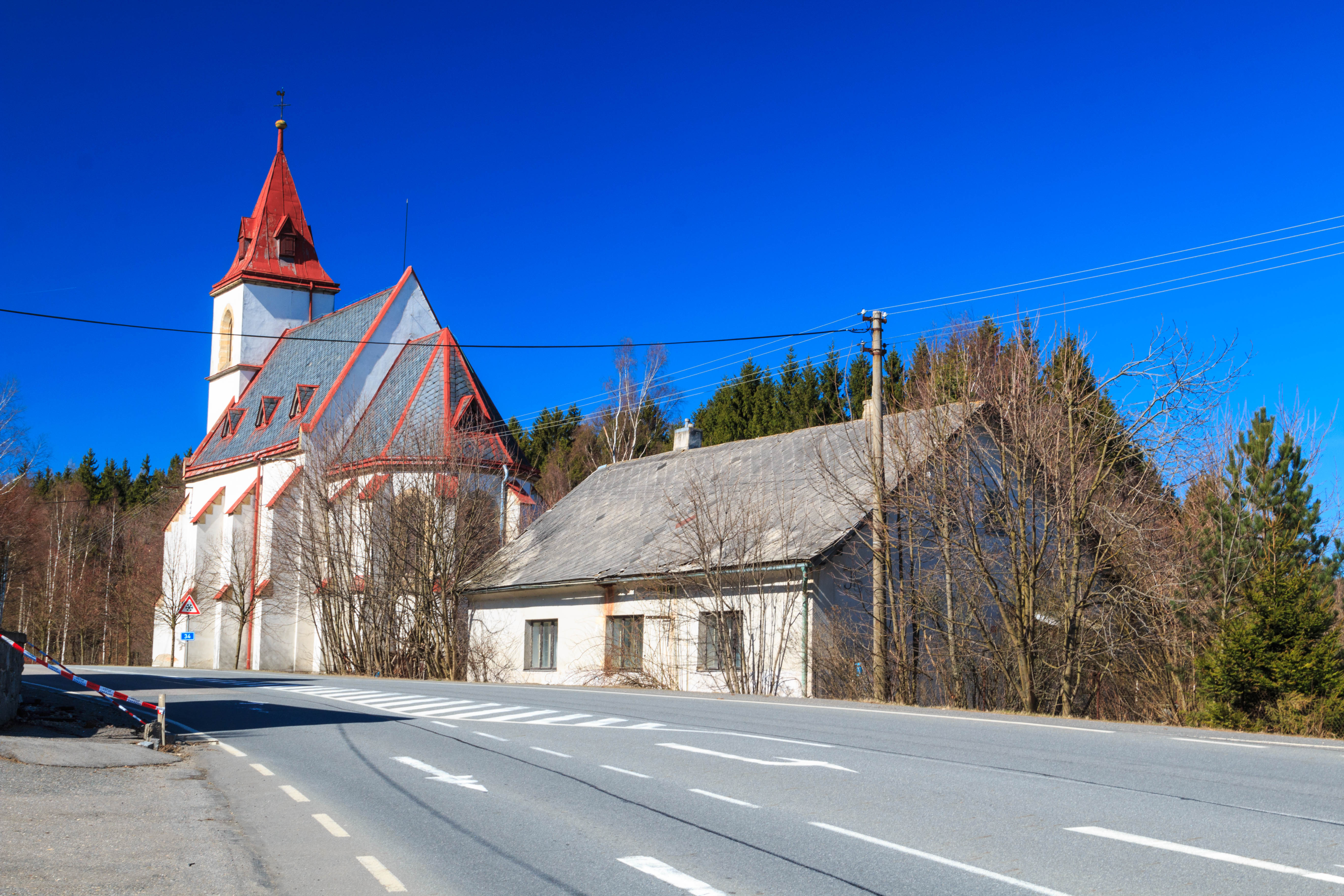
Church of Saint Catherine

The most valuable monument of Borová is the Church of Saint Margaret. It was founded by the Benedictines in the 14th century. Originally a Gothic structure, it was rebuilt and expanded in the 17th and 18th centuries. It has a bell tower with a wooden upper floor. Next to the church is a late Renaissance ossuary.

There are two other churches in Borová: the Church of Saint Catherine in the upper part of Borová, whose origin also dates back to the 14th century, and the Evangelical church from the 18th century.

In Borová there are several well-preserved examples of regional folk architecture (so-called "Polička type").
