= Dubie, Łódź Voivodeship =

Dubie
- Village
- Location within Poland
- Coordinates: 51°21′39″N 19°3′22″E
- Country: Poland
- Voivodeship: Łódź
- County: Bełchatów
- Gmina: Szczerców
- Population: 173

Dubie [ˈdubjɛ] is a village in the administrative district of Gmina Szczerców, within Bełchatów County, Łódź Voivodeship, in central Poland.
