= Borovoy, Altai Krai =

Borovoy Боровой
- Settlement
- Location within Altai Krai Location within Russia
- Coordinates: 52°34′N 85°18′E
- Country: Russia
- Region: Altai Krai
- District: Biysky District
- Time zone: UTC+7:00

Borovoy (Russian: Боровой) is a rural locality (a settlement) in Malougryonovsky Selsoviet, Biysky District, Altai Krai, Russia. The population was 551 as of 2013. There are 9 streets.

== Geography ==
Borovoy is located 13 km northeast of Biysk (the district's administrative centre) by road. Malourgenyovo is the nearest rural locality.
