= Świny, Łódź Voivodeship =

Świny
- Village
- Location within Poland
- Coordinates: 51°45′29″N 19°55′22″E
- Country: Poland
- Voivodeship: Łódź
- County: Łódź East
- Gmina: Koluszki

Świny [ˈɕfinɨ] is a village in the administrative district of Gmina Koluszki, within Łódź East County, Łódź Voivodeship, in central Poland.
