= Borowa, Łódź East County =

Borowa
- Village
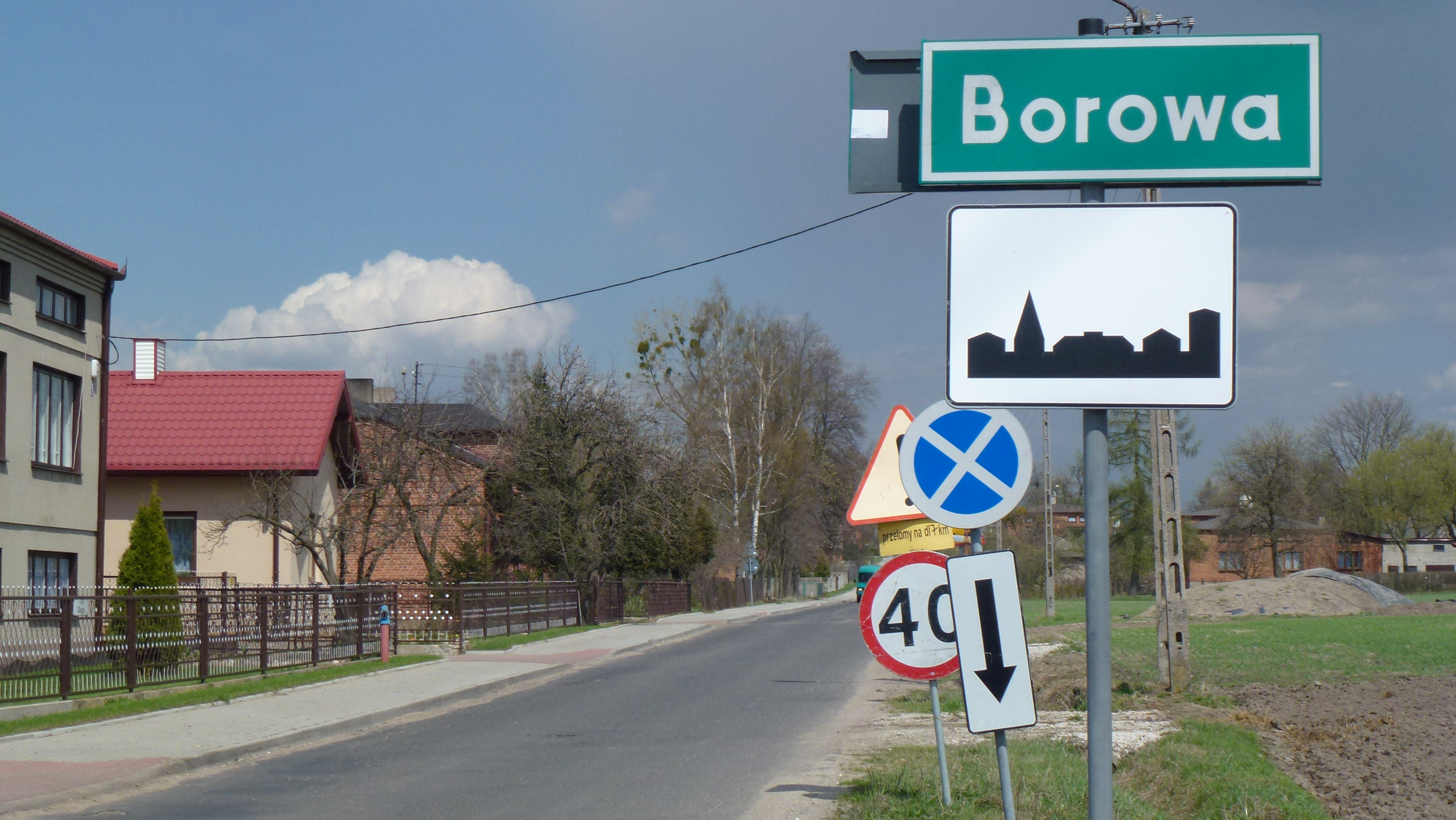

- Location within Poland
- Coordinates: 51°41′50″N 19°43′22″E
- Country: Poland
- Voivodeship: Łódź
- County: Łódź East
- Gmina: Koluszki

Borowa [bɔˈrɔva] (1800-1806, 1943–1945 German Wilhelmswalde) is a village in the administrative district of Gmina Koluszki, within Łódź East County, Łódź Voivodeship, in central Poland.
