= Borovaya, Belgorod Oblast =

Borovaya Боровая
- Selo
- Location within Belgorod Oblast Location within Russia
- Coordinates: 51°07′N 38°20′E
- Country: Russia
- Region: Belgorod Oblast
- District: Starooskolsky District
- Time zone: UTC+3:00

Borovaya (Russian: Боровая) is a rural locality (a selo) in Starooskolsky District, Belgorod Oblast, Russia. The population was 68 as of 2010. There is 1 street.

== Geography ==
Borovaya is located 52 km southeast of Stary Oskol (the district's administrative centre) by road. Vysoky is the nearest rural locality.
