= Borovoy Bridge =

Bridge in Saint Petersburg, Russia

Coordinates: 59°54′58″N 30°20′41″E

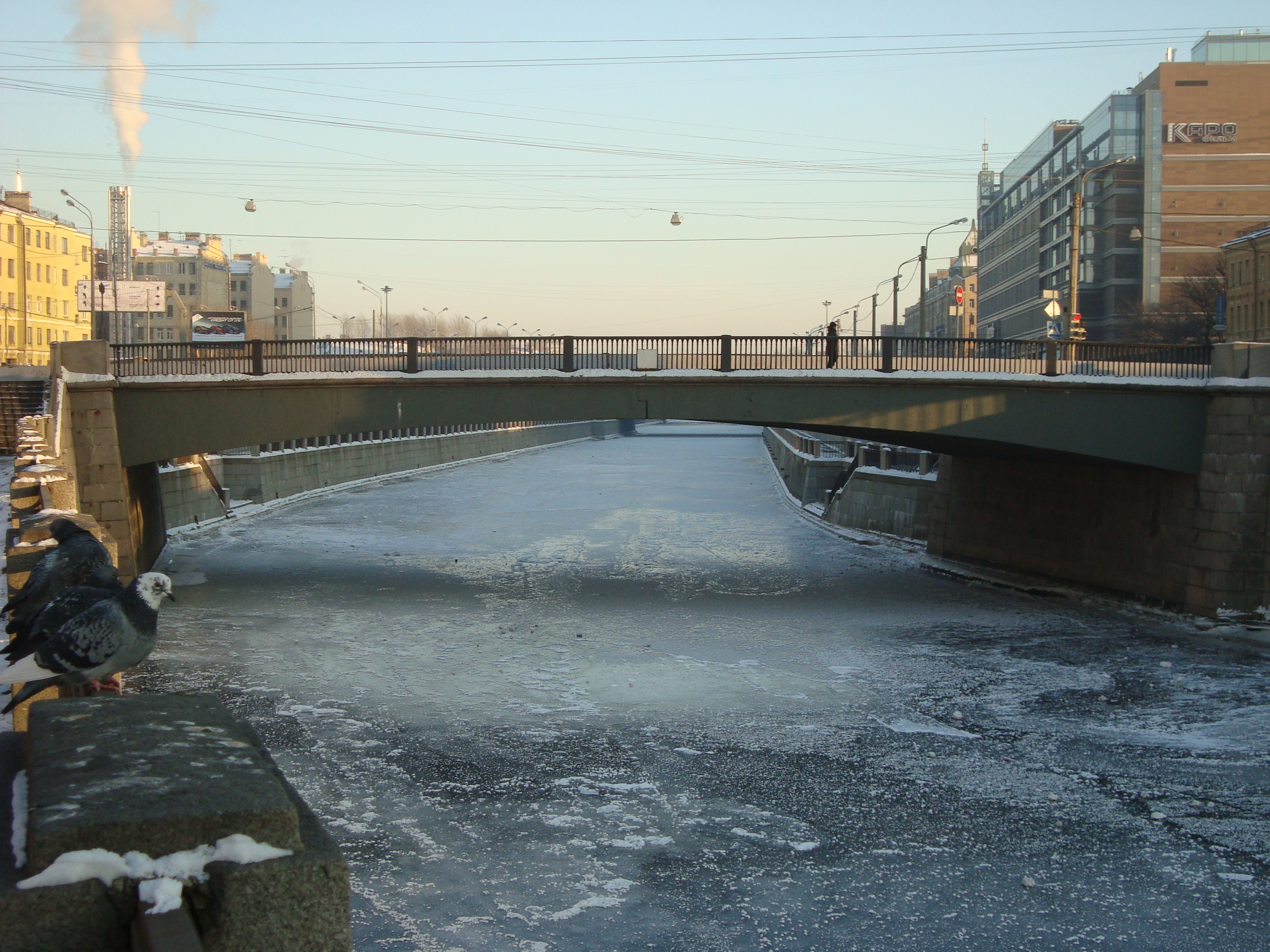

The Borovoy Bridge (Russian: Боровой мост) is a bridge in Saint Petersburg, Russia across the Obvodny Canal.

== History ==
Since 1881 until mid-1880s in its place there was the Andreyevsky Bridge. It was a wooden bride. It was renamed to Borovoy after the Borovaya Street.

The modern concrete bridge was constructed during 1960–1961.
