= Katarzynów, Łódź East County =

Katarzynów
- Village
- Location within Poland
- Coordinates: 51°44′32″N 19°51′3″E
- Country: Poland
- Voivodeship: Łódź
- County: Łódź East
- Gmina: Koluszki

Katarzynów [kataˈʐɨnuf] is a village in the administrative district of Gmina Koluszki, within Łódź East County, Łódź Voivodeship, in central Poland.
