= Felicjanów, Łódź East County =

Felicjanów
- Village
- Location within Poland
- Coordinates: 51°46′N 19°50′E
- Country: Poland
- Voivodeship: Łódź
- County: Łódź East
- Gmina: Koluszki

Felicjanów [fɛlit͡sˈjanuf] is a village in the administrative district of Gmina Koluszki, within Łódź East County, Łódź Voivodeship, in central Poland.
