= Grudna, Łódź Voivodeship =

Grudna
- Village
- Location within Poland
- Coordinates: 51°21′12″N 19°6′54″E
- Country: Poland
- Voivodeship: Łódź
- County: Bełchatów
- Gmina: Szczerców

Grudna [ˈɡrudna] is a village in the administrative district of Gmina Szczerców, within Bełchatów County, Łódź Voivodeship, in central Poland.
