= Kościuszki, Łódź Voivodeship =

Kościuszki
- Village
- Location within Poland
- Coordinates: 51°19′13″N 19°4′46″E
- Country: Poland
- Voivodeship: Łódź
- County: Bełchatów
- Gmina: Szczerców

Kościuszki [kɔɕˈt͡ɕuʂki] is a village in the administrative district of Gmina Szczerców, within Bełchatów County, Łódź Voivodeship, in central Poland.
