= Marcelów, Bełchatów County =

Marcelów
- Village
- Location within Poland
- Coordinates: 51°22′30″N 19°6′39″E
- Country: Poland
- Voivodeship: Łódź
- County: Bełchatów
- Gmina: Szczerców

Marcelów [marˈt͡sɛluf] is a village in the administrative district of Gmina Szczerców, within Bełchatów County, Łódź Voivodeship, in central Poland.
