= Borovoy =

Borovoy or Borovoi Russian: Боровой, masculine) or Borovaya (Боровая; feminine) is a Russian last name shared by the following people:

- Ari Borovoy, Mexican singer, songwriter, and actor
- Alan Borovoy (1932–2015), Canadian lawyer
- Alexei Borovoi (1875–1935), Russian philosopher, anarchist
- Ari Borovoy (born 1979), Mexican singer of the OV7 pop group
- Konstantin Borovoi (born 1948), Russian politician
- Mikhail Borovoi, (born 1951), Soviet and Israeli mathematician
- Saul Borovoi (1903–1989), Soviet economist an historian of Russian and Ukrainian Jewry
- Yakov Borovoi (1947–2010), Soviet and Russian journalist and writer
