= Szczerców =

- Village
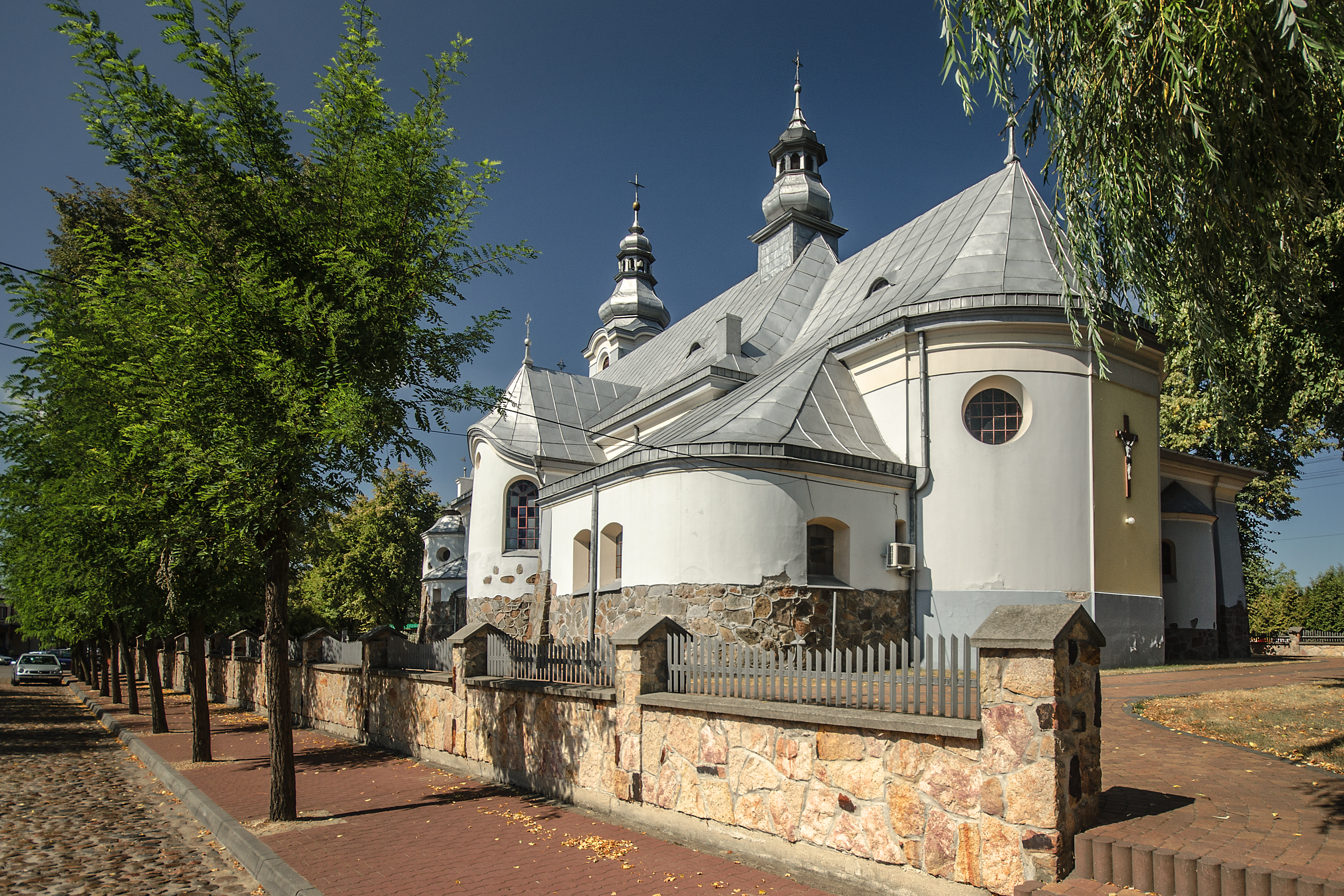
- Church of the Nativity of the Virgin Mary

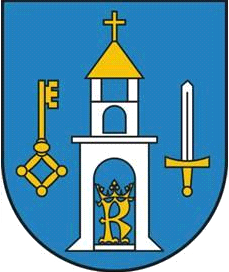
- Coat of arms

- Location within Poland
- Coordinates: 51°20′N 19°7′E
- Country: Poland
- Voivodeship: Łódź
- County: Bełchatów
- Gmina: Szczerców

Area
  - Total: 129 km^{2} (50 sq mi)

Population
  - Total: 3,300
  - Density: 26/km^{2} (66/sq mi)
- Time zone: UTC+1 (CET)
  - Summer (DST): UTC+2 (CEST)
- Postal Code: 97-420
- Area Code: (+48) 44
- Vehicle registration: EBE
- Website: www.szczercow.org

Szczerców [ˈʂt͡ʂɛrt͡suf] is a village in Bełchatów County, Łódź Voivodeship, in central Poland. It is the seat of the gmina (administrative district) called Gmina Szczerców. It is located in the Sieradz Land.

== History ==
Szczerców was a royal town of the Kingdom of Poland, administratively located in the Sieradz County in the Sieradz Voivodeship in the Greater Poland Province.

The town had a history of Jewish migration and settlement, with 35 percent of the population claiming Jewish ancestry at the start of World War II. Shortly after Hitler's forces invaded Poland in 1939, German troops arrived in the town at September 3, 1939. Polish and German troops fought bitterly between September 4 and 5, resulting in the near destruction of the town. The synagogue was burned, and its ruins dismantled after the war, while the majority of Jewish residents took shelter in nearby towns Zelów and Bełchatów.

Among the soldiers to perish in the fighting at Szczerców was Prince Oskar of Prussia (1915–39), a lieutenant with Nazi German Infantry Regiment 51 and a grandson of deposed Kaiser Wilhelm II, through his son Prince Oskar (1888-1958).

== Natural history ==
In 2023 a skeletal remain (an osteoderm) of a fossil (Miocene) crocodylian was found on the Szczerców field of the Bełchatów mine. This is the northernmost finding of a Neogene fossil crocodylian at world's scale.

== Transport ==
National road 74 bypasses Szczerców to the north.

The nearest railway station is Rusiec Łodźki.
