= Bełchatów Coal Mine =

Mine in Poland

Bełchatów coal mine
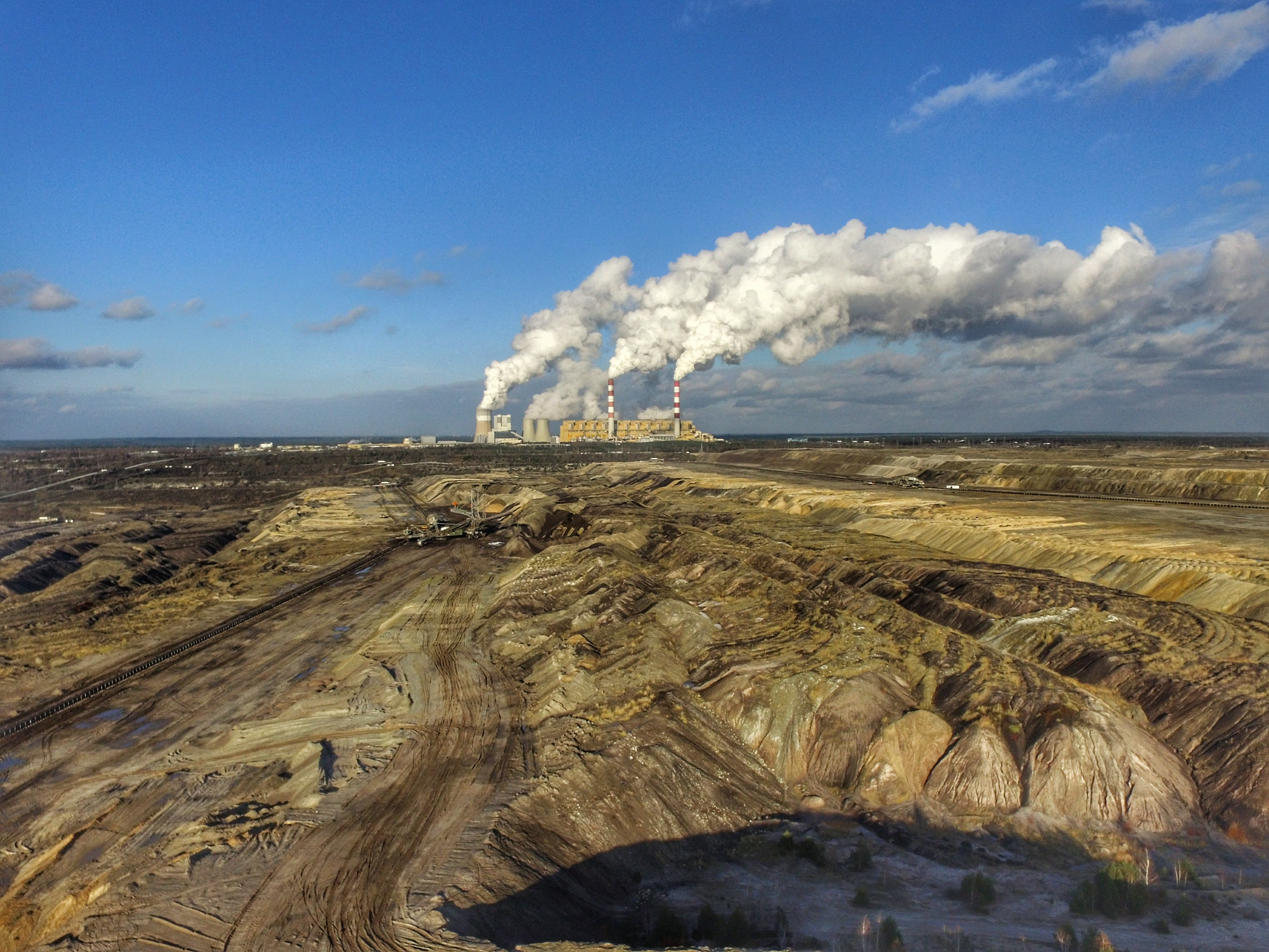

- Location in Poland

Location
- Location: Bełchatów, Łódź Voivodeship, Poland; 51°14′01″N 019°18′46″E

Production
- Products: Coal
- Production: 40,000,000+ t/year

History
- Opened: 1955

Owner
- Company: Kopalnia Wegla Brunatnego Bełchatów

The Bełchatów coal mine (Polish: Kopalnia Węgla Brunatnego „Bełchatów”) is a large open-pit mine in the centre of Poland in Bełchatów, Łódź Voivodeship, 150 km west of the capital, Warsaw. Bełchatów represents one of the largest coal reserves in Poland having estimated reserves of 1,930 million tonnes of lignite coal. In 2015, the mine produced 42.1 million tonnes of lignite (66.7% of Poland's total lignite production) to feed Bełchatów Power Station.

This mine is also a palaeontological site, the age of which is Miocene. Fossil plants and the fragment of a crocodile have been found there.
