= Krutikha, Krutikhinsky District, Altai Krai =

Rural locality in Russia

Krutikha Крутиха
- Selo
- Interactive map of Krutikha
- Location of Krutikha Krutikha (Altai Krai)
- Coordinates: 53°57′54″N 81°12′30″E
- Country: Russia
- Federal subject: Altai Krai
- Administrative district: Krutikhinsky District
- SelsovietSelsoviet: Krutikhinsky Selsoviet
- Founded: 1724

Population (2010 Census)
  - Total: 3,804
  - Estimate (2021): 3,010 (−20.9%)

Administrative status
  - Capital of: Krutikhinsky District, Krutikhinsky Selsoviet

Municipal status
  - Municipal district: Krutikhinsky Municipal District
  - Rural settlement: Krutikhinsky Selsoviet Rural Settlement
  - Capital of: Krutikhinsky Municipal District, Krutikhinsky Selsoviet Rural Settlement
- Time zone: UTC+7 (MSK+4)
- Postal code: 658750
- OKTMO ID: 01621430101

Krutikha (Russian: Крутиха) is a rural locality (a selo) and the administrative center of Krutikhinsky District of Altai Krai, Russia. Population: 3,804 (2010 census); 4,328 (2002 census); 4,199 (1989 Soviet census).
