= Krutikhinsky District =

Krutikhinsky District Крутихинский район (Russian)
- District
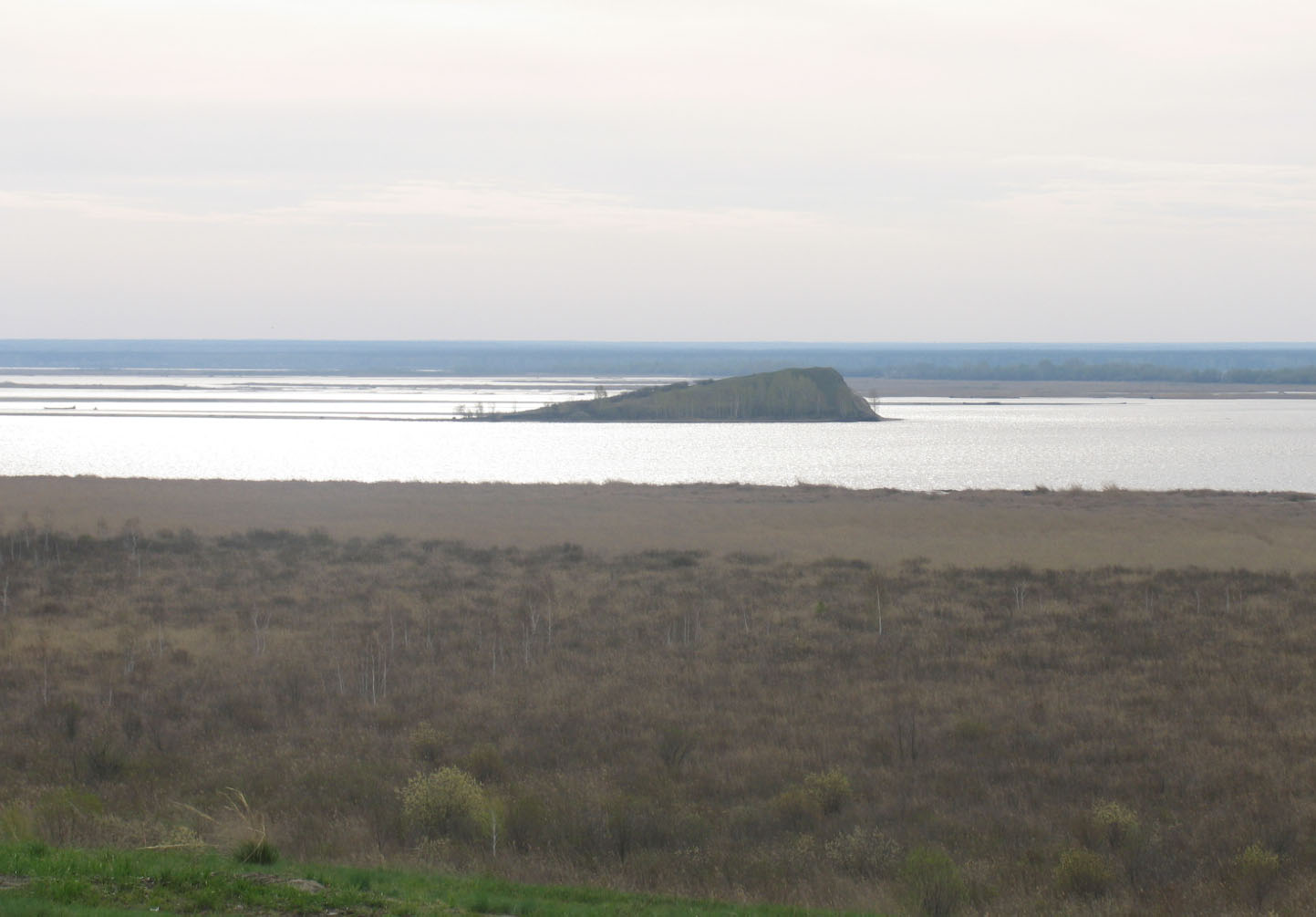
- View of Novosibirsk Reservoir

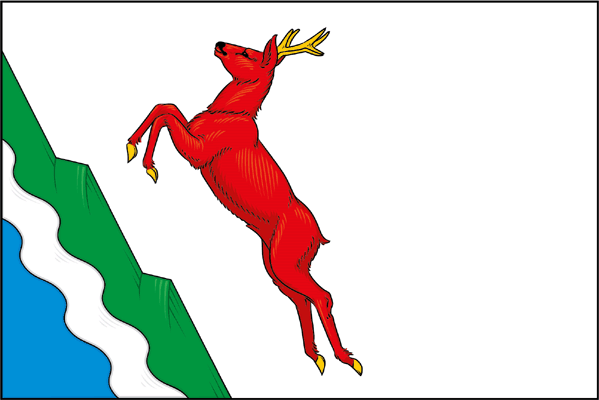
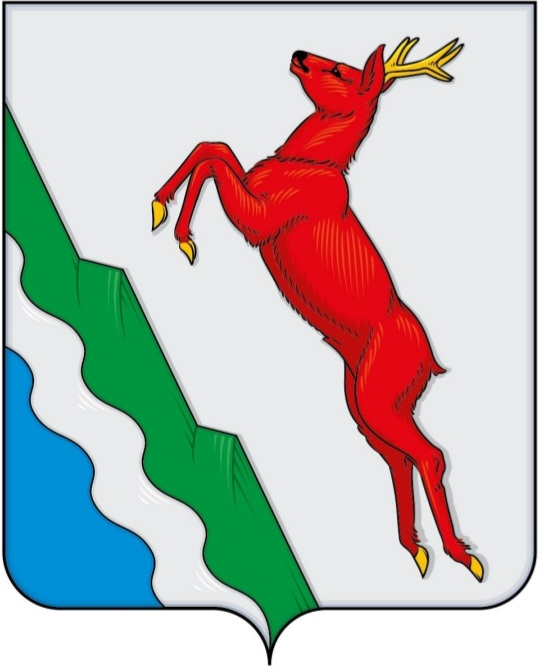
- Flag Coat of arms
- Location of Krutikhinsky District in Altai Krai
- Coordinates: 53°57′42″N 81°12′45″E
- Country: Russia
- Federal subject: Altai Krai
- Established: 1974
- Administrative center: Krutikha

Area
  - Total: 2,051 km^{2} (792 sq mi)

Population (2010 Census)
  - Total: 11,301
  - Density: 5.510/km^{2} (14.27/sq mi)
  - Urban: 0%
  - Rural: 100%

Administrative structure
  - Administrative divisions: 9 selsoviet
  - Inhabited localities: 17 rural localities

Municipal structure
  - Municipally incorporated as: Krutikhinsky Municipal District
  - Municipal divisions: 0 urban settlements, 9 rural settlements
- Time zone: UTC+7 (MSK+4)
- OKTMO ID: 01621000
- Website: http://admin.krutiha.ru/

Krutikhinsky District (Russian: Крути́хинский райо́н) is an administrative and municipal district (raion), one of the fifty-nine in Altai Krai, Russia. It is located in the north of the krai. The area of the district is 2,051 square kilometers (792 sq mi). Its administrative center is the rural locality (a selo) of Krutikha. Population: 11,301 (2010 census); 13,944 (2002 census); 13,738 (1989 Soviet census). The population of Krutikha accounts for 33.7% of the district's total population.
