= Krześlów =

- Village
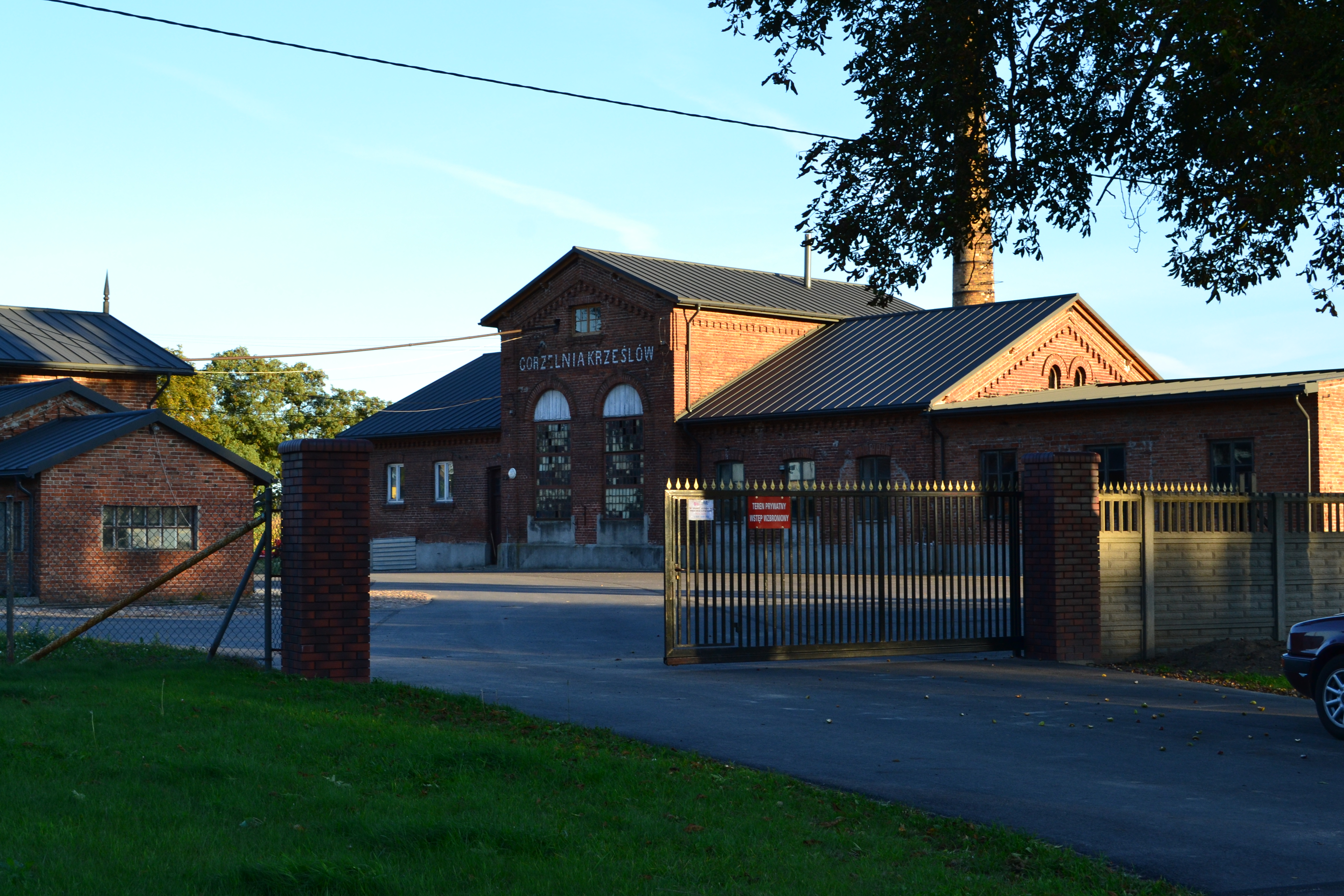

- Location within Poland
- Coordinates: 51°26′10″N 19°10′43″E
- Country: Poland
- Voivodeship: Łódź
- County: Bełchatów
- Gmina: Zelów

Krześlów [ˈkʂɛɕluf] is a village in the administrative district of Gmina Zelów within Bełchatów County, Łódź Voivodeship, in central Poland. It is located approximately 5 km (3 mi) southwest of Zelów, 16 km (10 mi) northwest of Bełchatów, and 44 km (27 mi) southwest of the regional capital, Łódź.
