= Zelów =

Town in Łódź Voivodeship, Poland

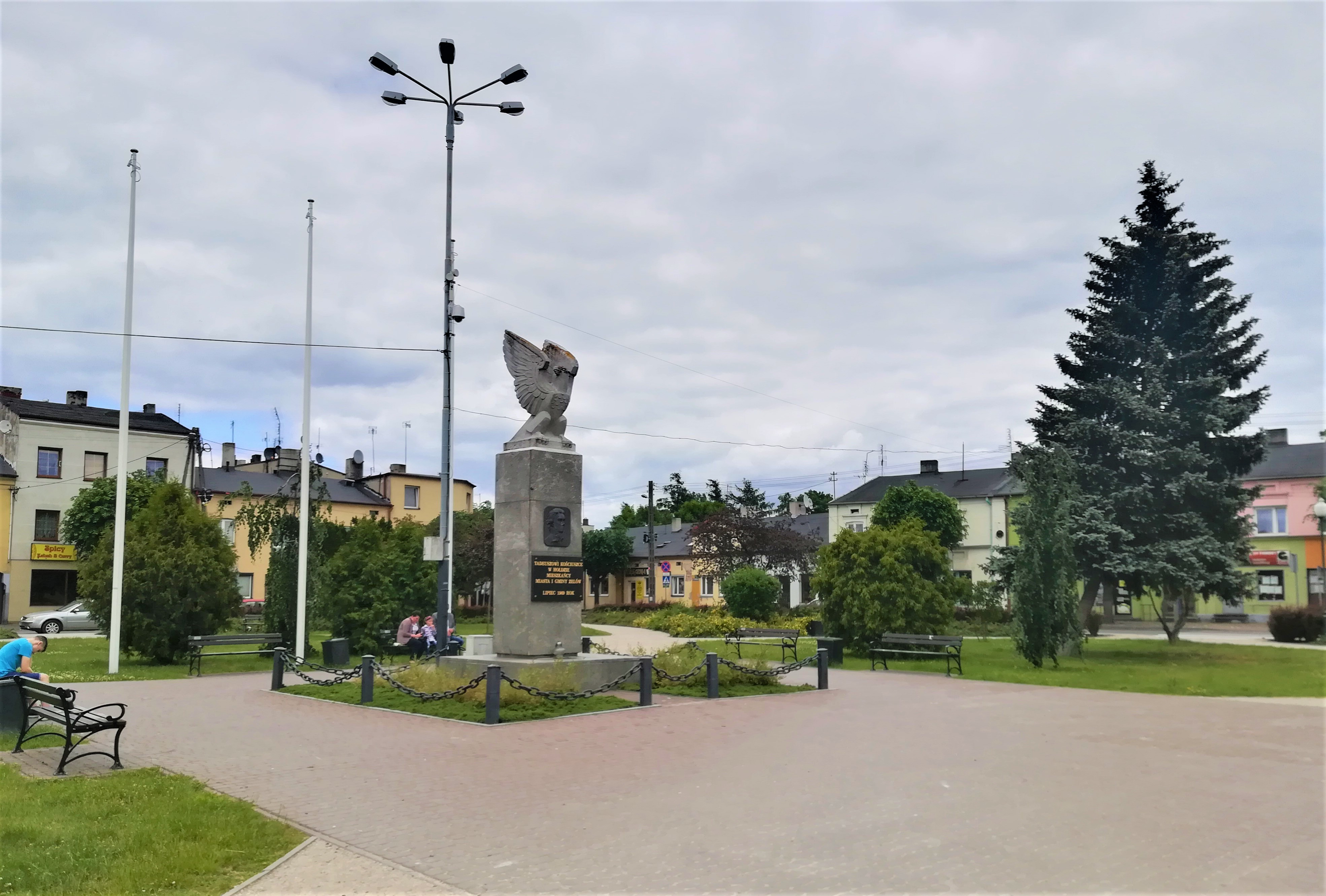
- Market Square and Tadeusz Kościuszko memorial in Zelów

- Coat of arms

- Location within Poland
- Coordinates: 51°28′N 19°13′E
- Country: Poland
- Voivodeship: Łódź
- County: Bełchatów
- Gmina: Zelów

Government
  - Mayor: Kamil Świtała

Area
  - Total: 10.75 km^{2} (4.15 sq mi)

Population (31 December 2020)
  - Total: 7,459 ▼
  - Density: 693.9/km^{2} (1,797/sq mi)
- Time zone: UTC+1 (CET)
  - Summer (DST): UTC+2 (CEST)
- Postal code: 97-425
- Car plates: EBE
- Website: http://www.zelow.pl

Zelów [ˈzɛluf] (Czech: Zelov) is a town in Bełchatów County, Łódź Voivodeship, in central Poland, with 7,459 inhabitants (2020). It is located in the historic Sieradz Land.

== History ==
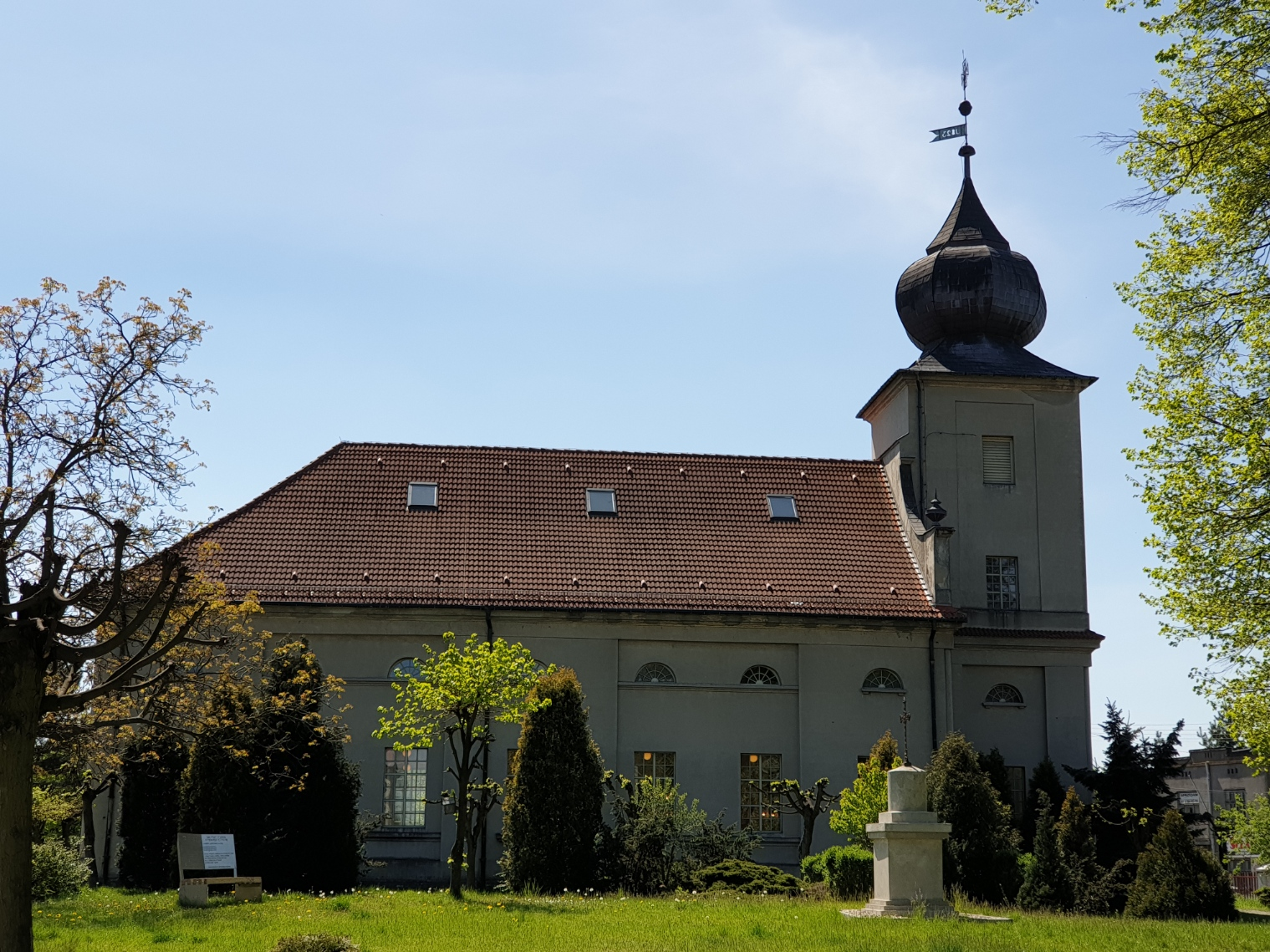
Reformed church in Zelów

Zelów was probably founded in the 13th century, when it was part of fragmented Piast-ruled Poland. It was mentioned in documents in 1441. In 1802 the town was purchased by Czech colonists from Czernin, Mały Tabor, and Duży Tabor. The official act of purchase dated- 21 December 1802, says, that Józef Świdziński sold the village with all its surrounding grounds, forests, buildings, etc. for a figure of 25,666 Prussian thalers, which was equivalent to 154,000 Polish zlotych. The former owner of the land promised to relocate the peasants living in the territory, however, according to the contract, they had a right to harvest crops of what they planted during fall. The first Czech families that came into Zelów in 1803 soon began to build houses and communal buildings, since the existing ones were not enough to accommodate the group of newcomers. The main building material used by the colonists was wood obtained from the surrounding forests. Each of the family was given around 18 Morgens of farmlands and 18 Morgens of forests. Within the first few years, the colonists had to build roads and bridges for the sake of Trakt Napoleoński. Despite initial difficulties, Zelów was expanding. By 1827 the settlement consisted of 142 houses and 847 settlers(which paralleled the demographics of the surrounding villages). After years of effort, the Kingdom of Poland gave Czech colonists permission for building a church. Most of the building costs were covered by the residents. Construction lasted from 1821 to 1825. The development of the city contributed to a new wave of colonists coming in, which resulted in population growth. This led to the development of the surrounding area, new villages emerged (like Zelówek, Ignaców, Pożdżenice). Since agriculture wasn't profitable enough Zelów residents had to engage in additional activities like weaving, hackwork, production of tablecloths, and other jobs. The weaving industry became a significant part of the town’s history in the years to come.

In the 1921 census, 72.0% of the population declared Polish nationality, 15.1% Czech, 10.3% Jewish and 2.6% German.

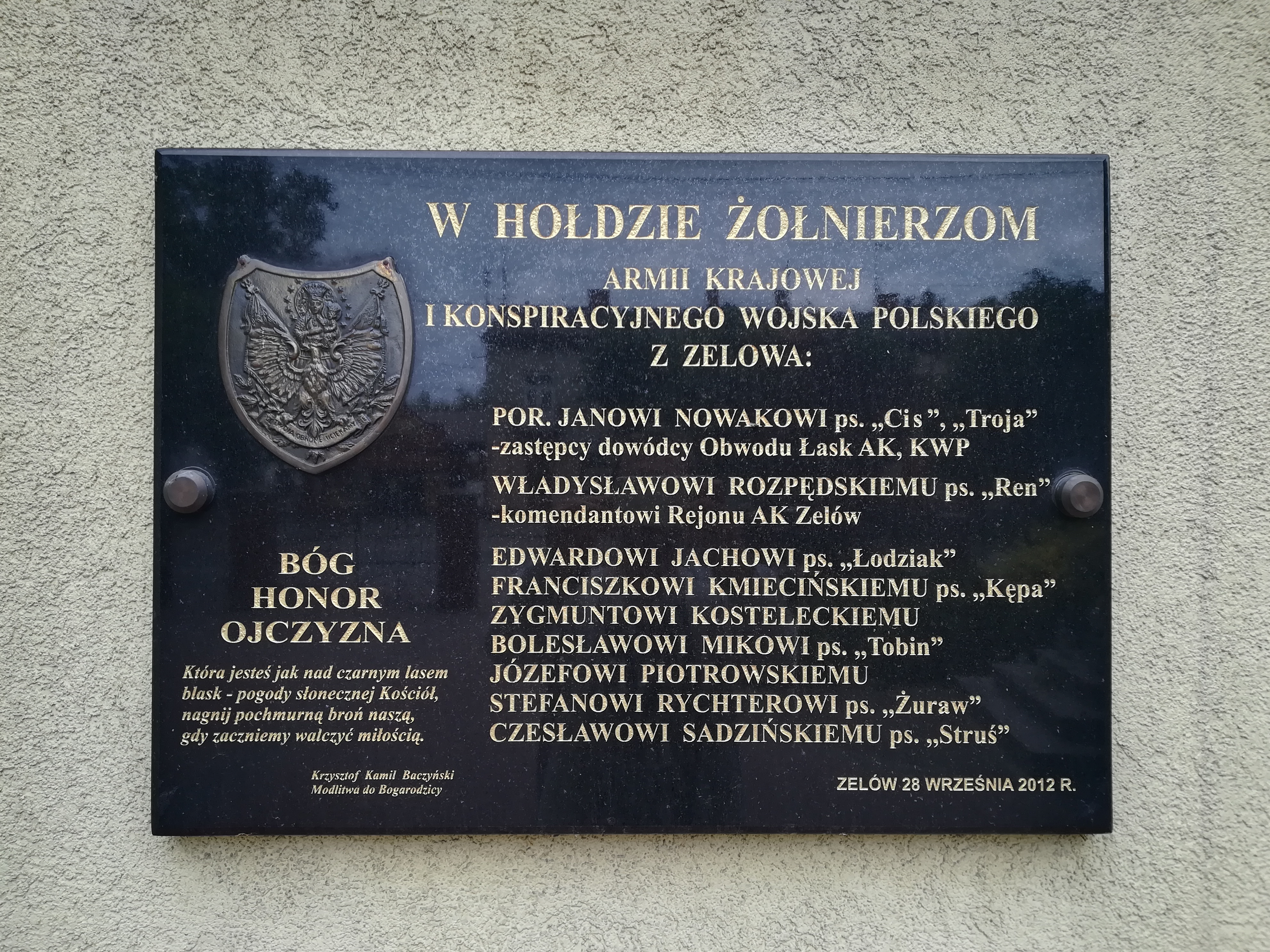
Memorial plaque to local members of the Home Army and Underground Polish Army in the Catholic Church of Saint Mary

When the Germans invaded Poland at the start of World War II in September 1939, they began to rob and terrorize the Jewish population. Some Jews fled the town in 1939, but the Jewish population increased when the Germans resettled hundreds from nearby towns in Zelów. The ghetto population rose to more than 6,000 by early 1941. During this early stage of the war, local ethnic Germans were often brutal to the Jews, but some Poles and local Czechs were more sympathetic, even providing some food. Similarly, the German wholesale company Karl Lieb provided food vouchers to the local Jewish population. The Germans imprisoned several Polish women from Zelów in a female prison in Łódź for helping Jews and their fate remains unknown. A subcamp of the Nazi German prison in Sieradz was operated in Zelów, and another subcamp was located in the present-day district of Herbertów. Nevertheless, the Polish resistance movement was active in the town. In what must be a unique occurrence, two Jewish boys played on the Hitler Youth football team, a fact that brought an angry protest from one of their opponents. In spring 1942, ten Jews were publicly hanged with the Jewish population forced to watch. In June, some Jews were sent to the Chełmno extermination camp, where they were immediately gassed. About 100 were sent to the Łódź Ghetto. In August 1942, the remaining Jews were rounded up and held in a local factory and church. Some were murdered on the spot, about 150 were sent to the Łódź Ghetto, a few tried to hide, and the rest were sent to be murdered at Chełmno. The German occupation ended in 1945, and the town was restored to Poland, although with a Soviet-installed communist regime, which remained in power until the Fall of Communism in the 1980s.

Only about 40 Zelów Jews survived and found their way back to Zelów after the war. They found one of their synagogues burned and the other used as a storehouse. They soon left.

== Transport ==
Zelów lies along voivodeship road which connects it to Bełchatów.

The nearest railway station is in Łask.

== Sports ==
The local football club is Włókniarz Zelów. It competes in the lower leagues.
