= Faustynów, Gmina Zelów =

Faustynów
- Village
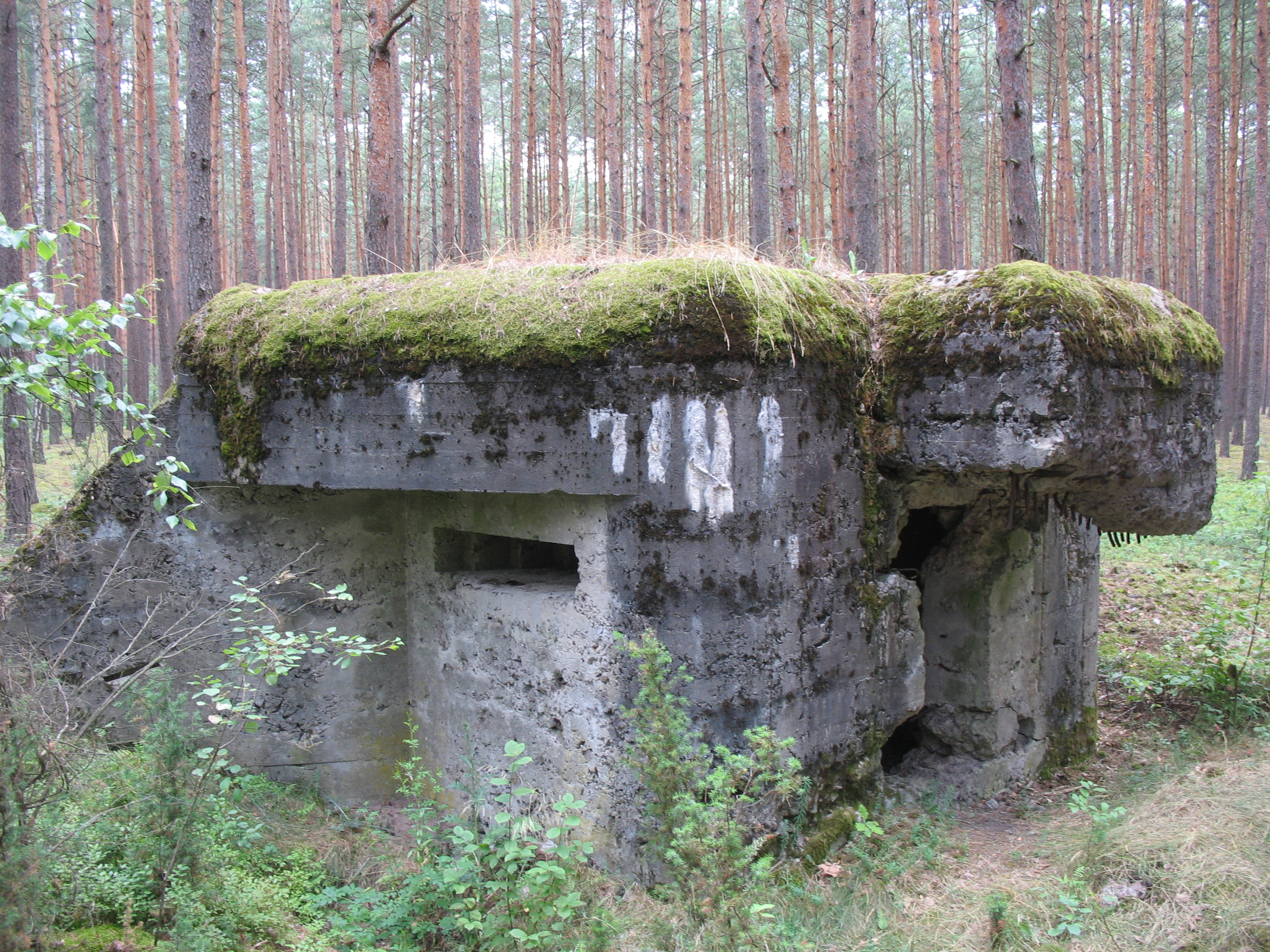
- Bunker

- Location within Poland
- Coordinates: 51°24′5″N 19°5′23″E
- Country: Poland
- Voivodeship: Łódź
- County: Bełchatów
- Gmina: Zelów

Faustynów [fausˈtɨnuf] is a village in the administrative district of Gmina Zelów, within Bełchatów County, Łódź Voivodeship, in central Poland.
