= Bujny Księże =

- Village
- Location within Poland
- Coordinates: 51°27′N 19°16′E
- Country: Poland
- Voivodeship: Łódź
- County: Bełchatów
- Gmina: Zelów

Bujny Księże (Polish pronunciation: [ˈbujnɨ ˈkɕɛ̃ʐɛ]) is a village in the administrative district of Gmina Zelów, within Bełchatów County, Łódź Voivodeship, in central Poland.
