= Grębociny =

- Village
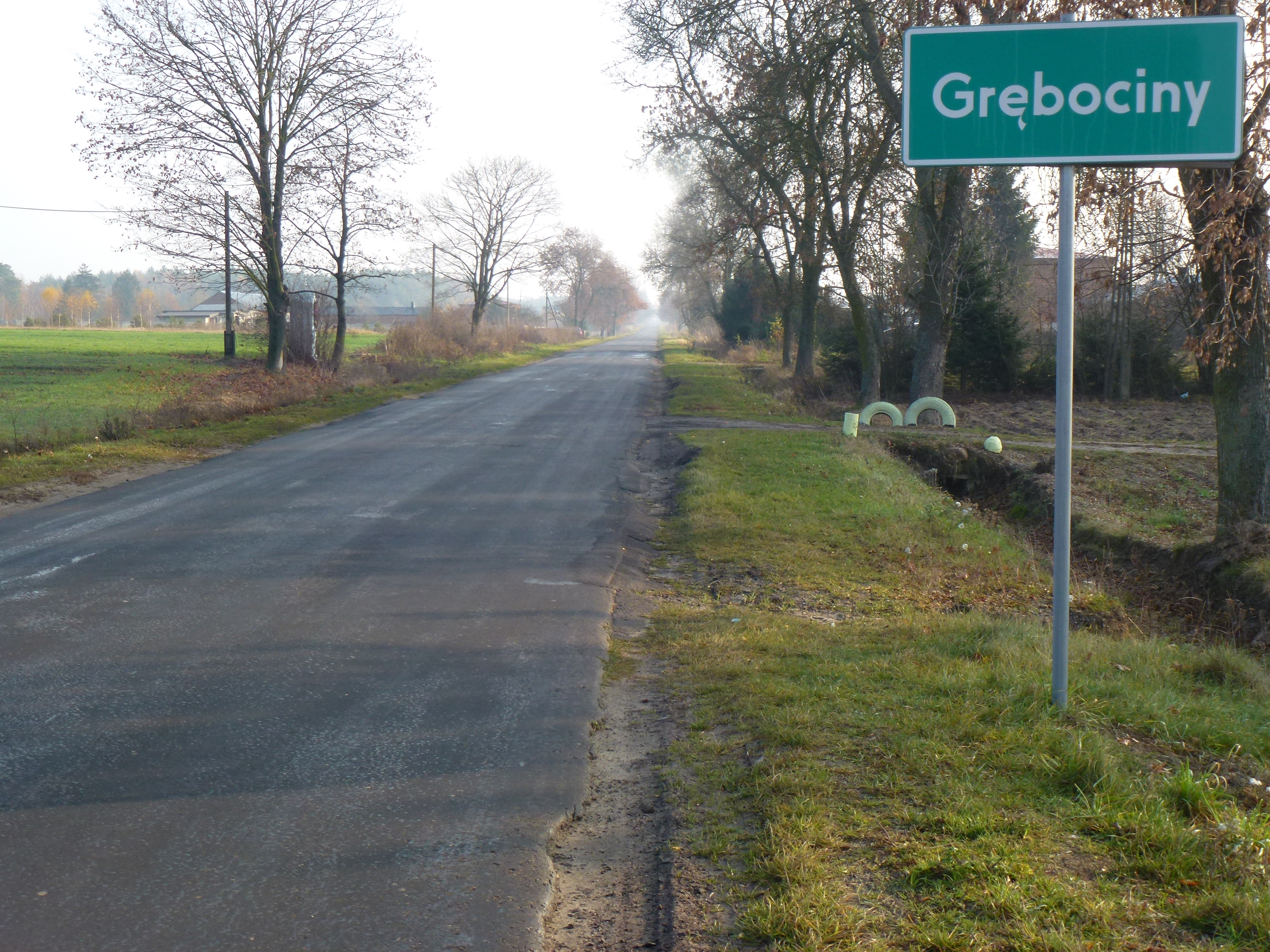

- Location within Poland
- Coordinates: 51°25′N 19°15′E
- Country: Poland
- Voivodeship: Łódź
- County: Bełchatów
- Gmina: Zelów

Grębociny [ɡrɛmbɔˈt͡ɕinɨ] is a village in the administrative district of Gmina Zelów, within Bełchatów County, Łódź Voivodeship, in central Poland.
