= Trząs =

- Village
- Location within Poland
- Coordinates: 51°18′N 19°11′E
- Country: Poland
- Voivodeship: Łódź
- County: Bełchatów
- Gmina: Kluki
- Elevation: 157 m (515 ft)
- Population: 235

Trząs [tʂɔ̃s] is a village in the administrative district of Gmina Kluki, within Bełchatów County, Łódź Voivodeship, in central Poland.
