= Sobki, Łódź Voivodeship =

Sobki
- Village
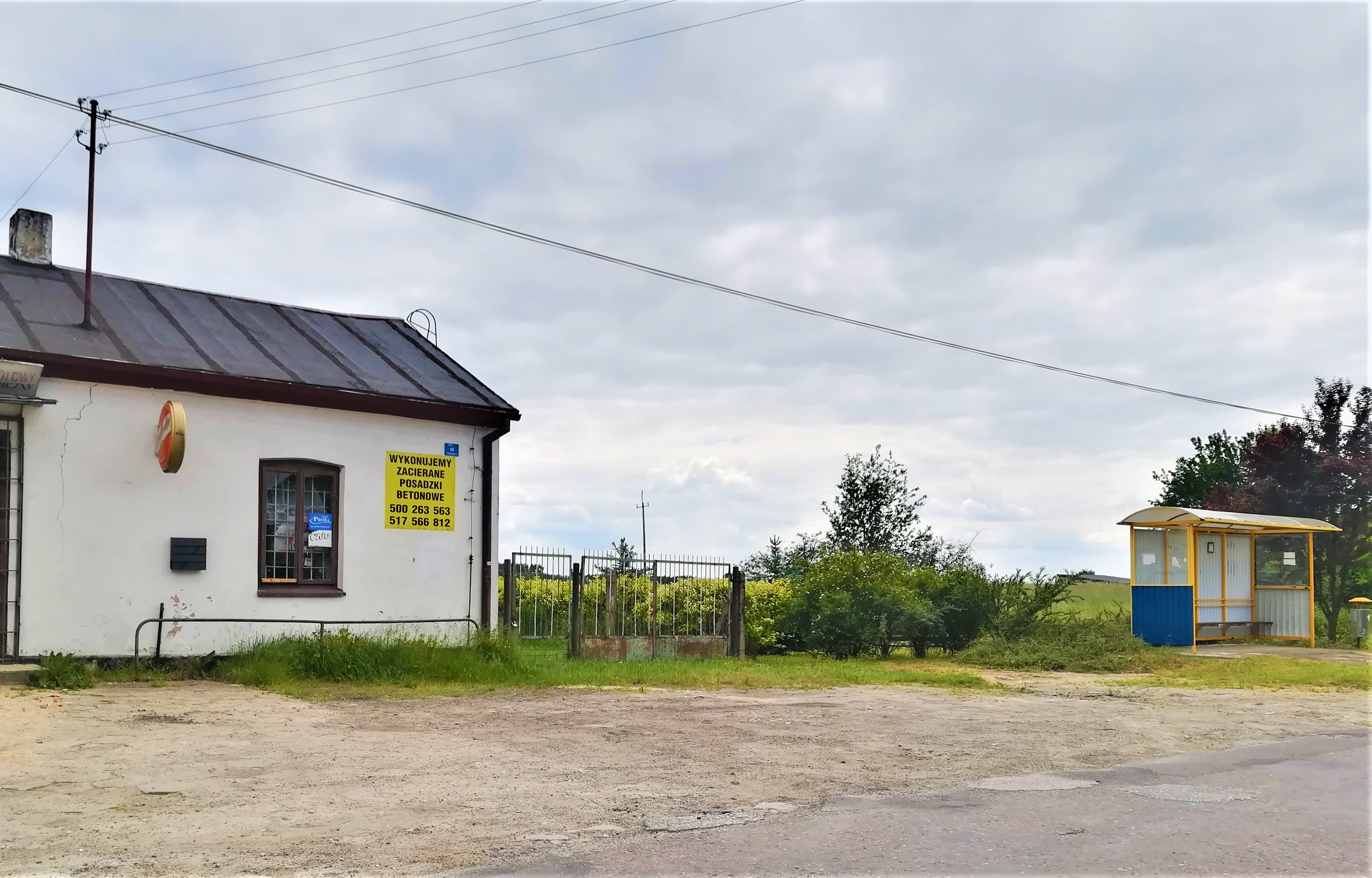

- Location within Poland
- Coordinates: 51°26′9″N 19°11′11″E
- Country: Poland
- Voivodeship: Łódź
- County: Bełchatów
- Gmina: Zelów

Sobki [ˈsɔpki] is a village in the administrative district of Gmina Zelów, within Bełchatów County, Łódź Voivodeship, in central Poland.
