= Kuźnica, Gmina Zelów =

Kuźnica
- Village
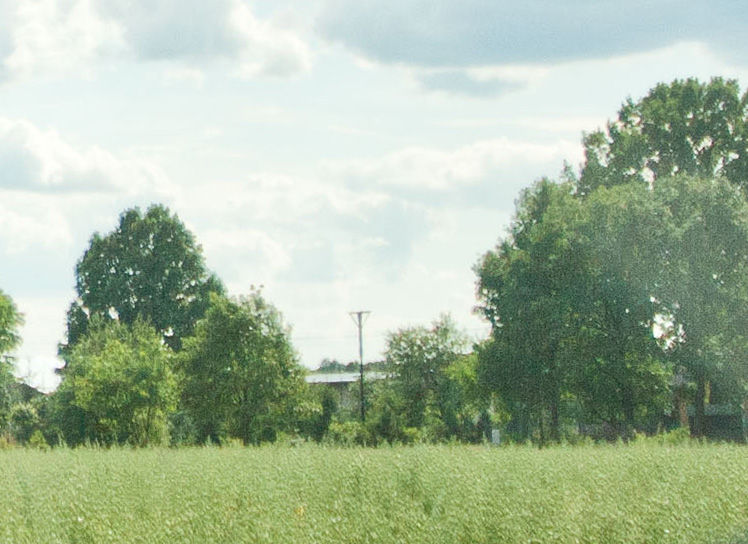

- Location within Poland
- Coordinates: 51°31′30″N 19°18′22″E
- Country: Poland
- Voivodeship: Łódź
- County: Bełchatów
- Gmina: Zelów
- Population: 70

Kuźnica (Polish pronunciation: [kuʑˈɲit͡sa]) is a village in the administrative district of Gmina Zelów, within Bełchatów County, Łódź Voivodeship, in central Poland.
