= Łobudzice, Bełchatów County =

Łobudzice
- Village
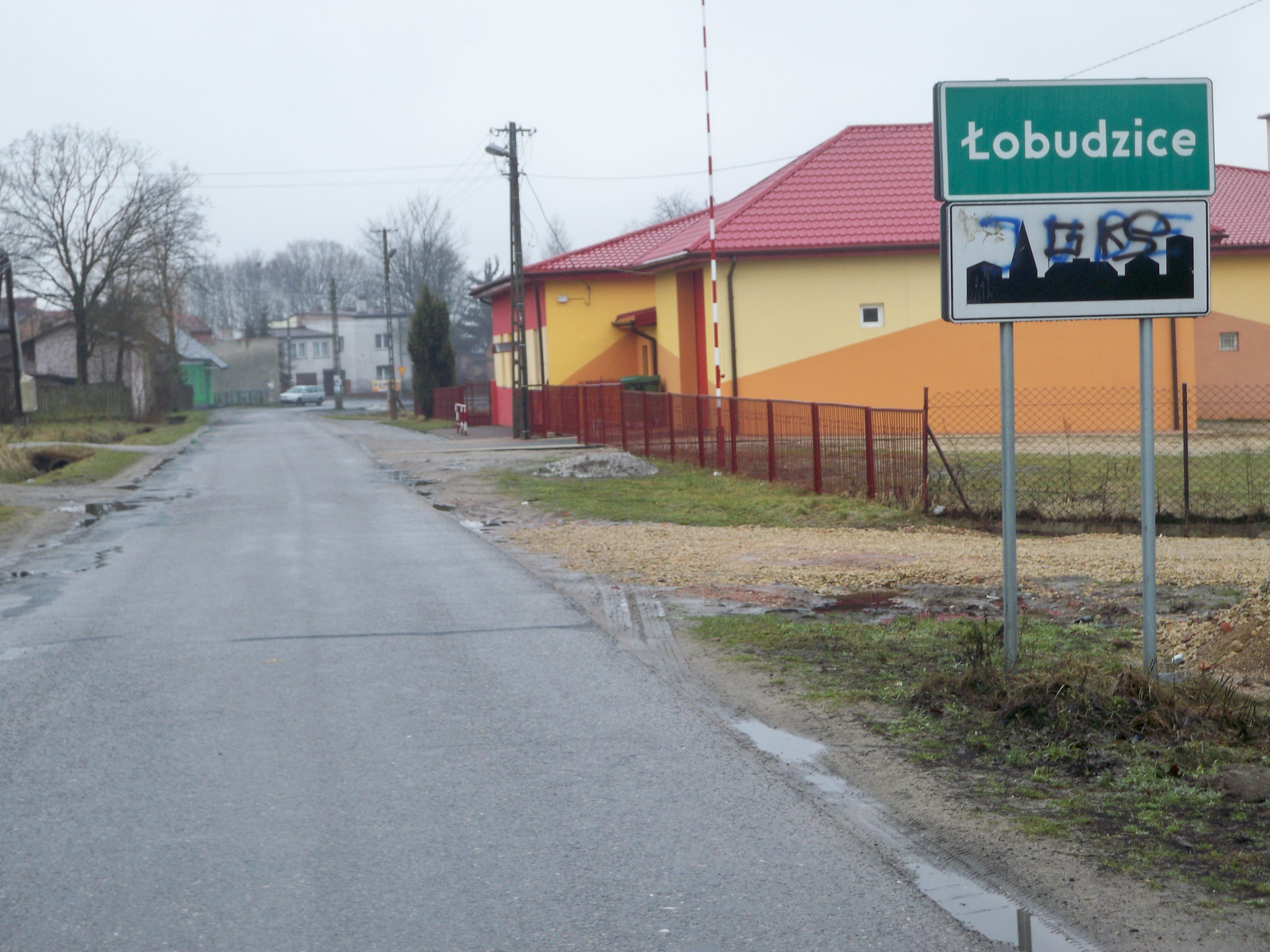

- Location within Poland
- Coordinates: 51°26′45″N 19°15′25″E
- Country: Poland
- Voivodeship: Łódź
- County: Bełchatów
- Gmina: Zelów
- Population: 420

Łobudzice [wɔbuˈd͡ʑit͡sɛ] is a village in the administrative district of Gmina Zelów, within Bełchatów County, Łódź Voivodeship, in central Poland.
