= Zarzecze, Bełchatów County =

Zarzecze
- Village
- Location within Poland
- Coordinates: 51°17′50″N 19°16′7″E
- Country: Poland
- Voivodeship: Łódź
- County: Bełchatów
- Gmina: Kluki

Zarzecze [zaˈʐɛt͡ʂɛ] is a village in the administrative district of Gmina Kluki, within Bełchatów County, Łódź Voivodeship, in central Poland.
