= Kaszewice =

- Village
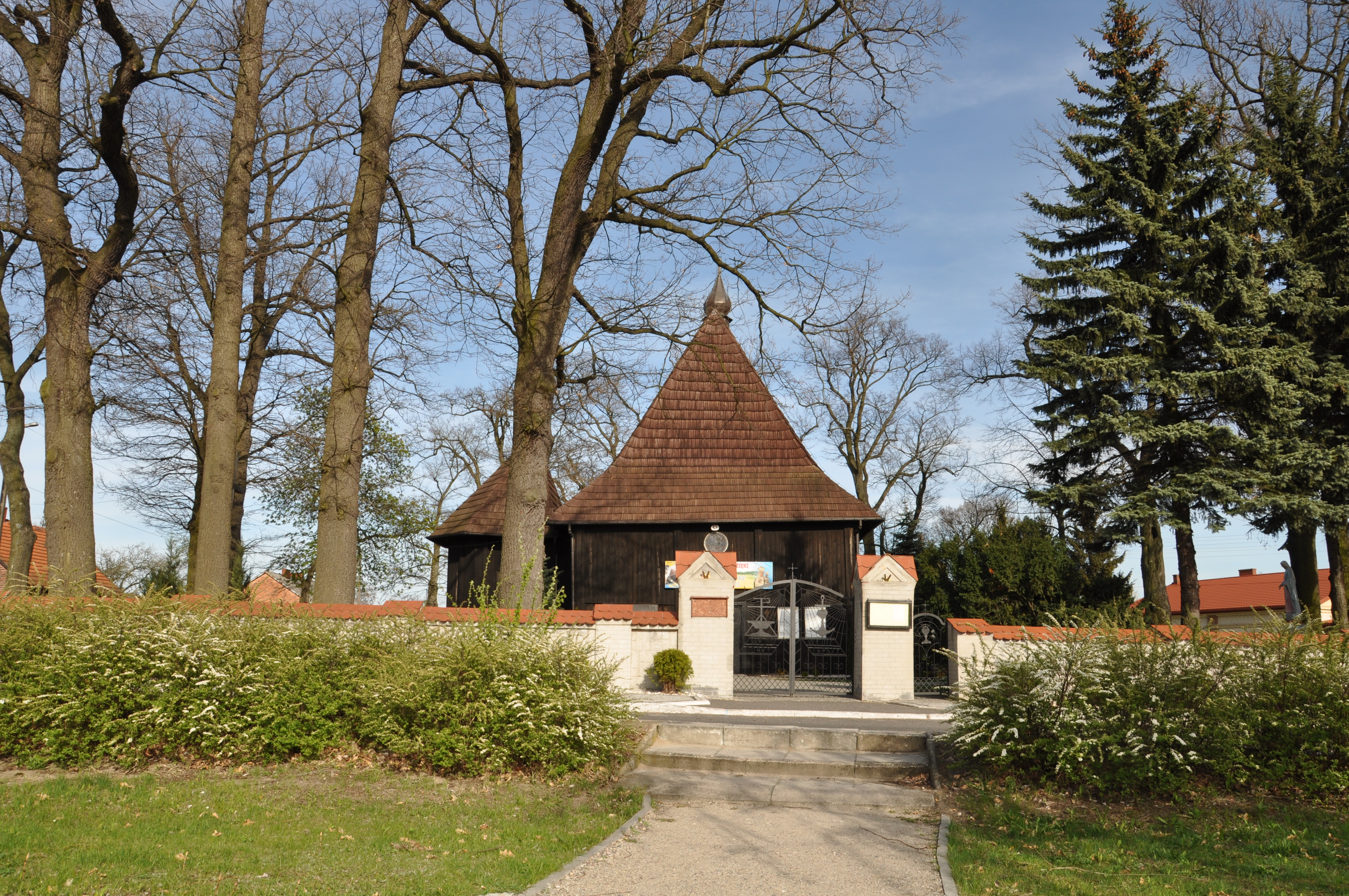
- Holy Trinity church in Kaszewice, front view

- Location within Poland
- Coordinates: 51°19′N 19°16′E
- Country: Poland
- Voivodeship: Łódź
- County: Bełchatów
- Gmina: Kluki
- Population: 500

Kaszewice [kaʂɛˈvit͡sɛ] is a village in the administrative district of Gmina Kluki, within Bełchatów County, Łódź Voivodeship, in central Poland. The village has a population of about 500.
