= Janów, Gmina Zelów =

Janów
- Village
- Location within Poland
- Coordinates: 51°25′23″N 19°12′20″E
- Country: Poland
- Voivodeship: Łódź
- County: Bełchatów
- Gmina: Zelów

Janów [ˈjanuf] is a village in the administrative district of Gmina Zelów, within Bełchatów County, Łódź Voivodeship, in central Poland.
