= Wypychów, Bełchatów County =

Wypychów
- Village
- Location within Poland
- Coordinates: 51°25′34″N 19°9′39″E
- Country: Poland
- Voivodeship: Łódź
- County: Bełchatów
- Gmina: Zelów
- Population: 260

Wypychów [vɨˈpɨxuf] is a village in the administrative district of Gmina Zelów, within Bełchatów County, Łódź Voivodeship, in central Poland.
