= Mauryców, Bełchatów County =

Mauryców
- Village
- Location within Poland
- Coordinates: 51°27′2″N 19°13′10″E
- Country: Poland
- Voivodeship: Łódź
- County: Bełchatów
- Gmina: Zelów

Mauryców [mauˈrɨt͡suf] is a village in the administrative district of Gmina Zelów, within Bełchatów County, Łódź Voivodeship, in central Poland.
