= Marszywiec =

- Village
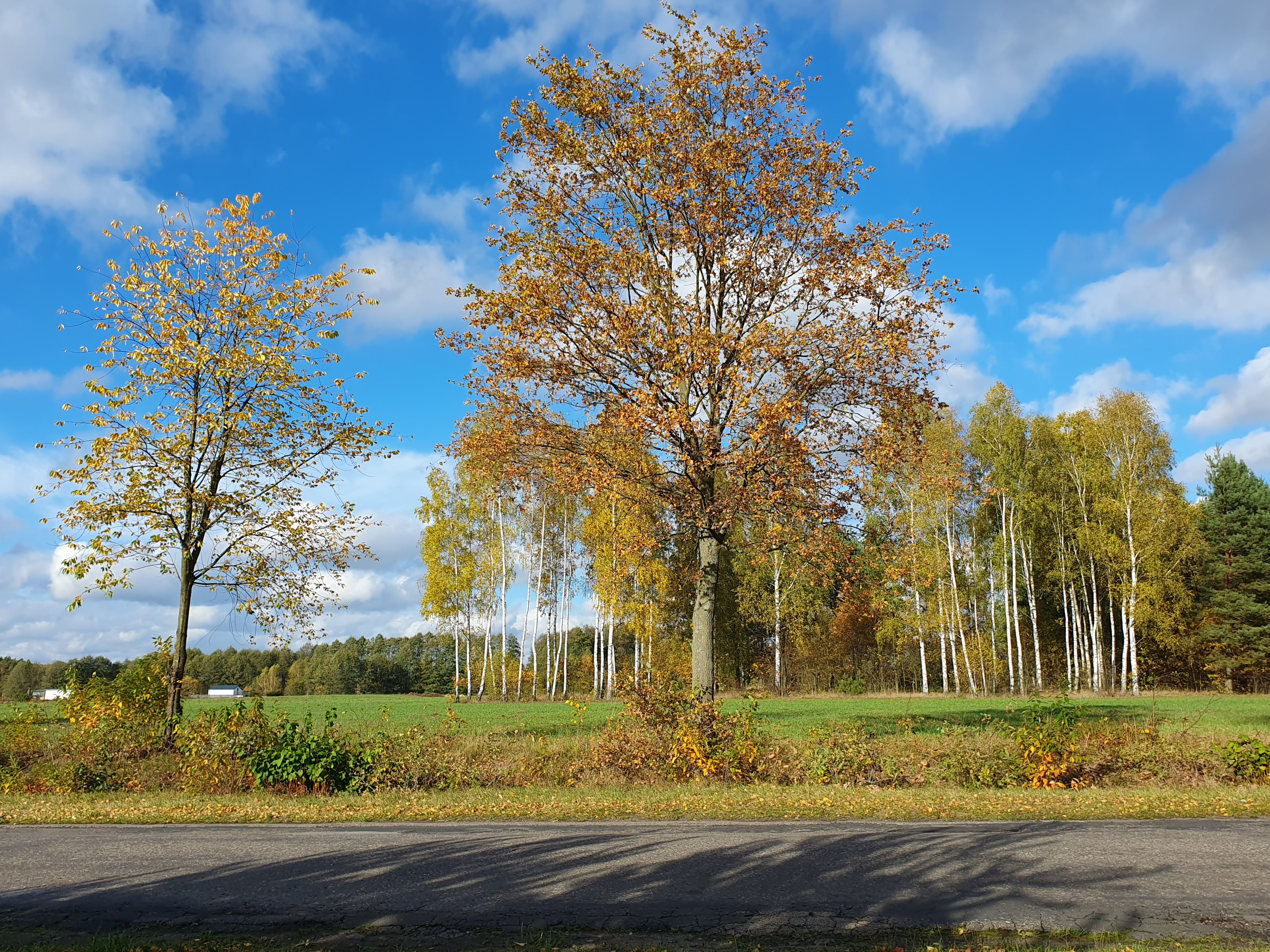

- Location within Poland
- Coordinates: 51°25′57″N 19°18′27″E
- Country: Poland
- Voivodeship: Łódź
- County: Bełchatów
- Gmina: Zelów
- Population: 60

Marszywiec [marˈʂɨvjɛt͡s] is a village in the administrative district of Gmina Zelów, within Bełchatów County, Łódź Voivodeship, in central Poland.
