= Zelówek =

- Village
- Location within Poland
- Coordinates: 51°29′N 19°15′E
- Country: Poland
- Voivodeship: Łódź
- County: Bełchatów
- Gmina: Zelów
- Time zone: UTC+1 (CET)
  - Summer (DST): UTC+2 (CEST)
- Vehicle registration: EBE

Zelówek [zɛˈluvɛk] is a village in the administrative district of Gmina Zelów, within Bełchatów County, Łódź Voivodeship, in central Poland. It is located in the historic Sieradz Land.

According to the 1921 census, the village had a population of 409, 76.8% Polish and 23.2% Czech.
