= Wygiełzów, Bełchatów County =

Wygiełzów
- Village
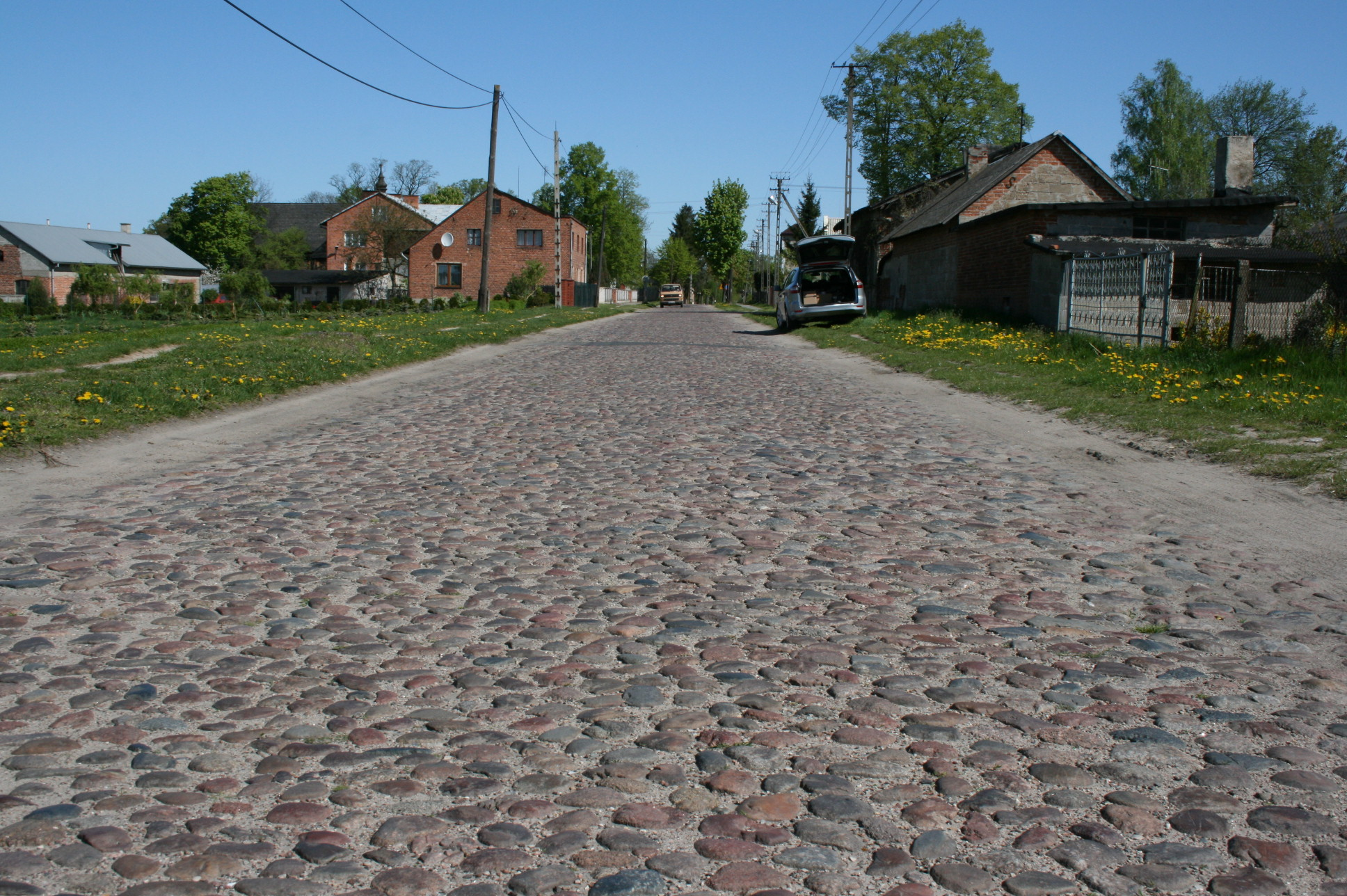

- Location within Poland
- Coordinates: 51°27′12″N 19°6′24″E
- Country: Poland
- Voivodeship: Łódź
- County: Bełchatów
- Gmina: Zelów

Wygiełzów [vɨˈɡʲɛu̯zuf] is a village in the administrative district of Gmina Zelów, within Bełchatów County, Łódź Voivodeship, in central Poland.
