= Gmina Zelów =

Gmina Zelów Zelów Commune
- Gmina
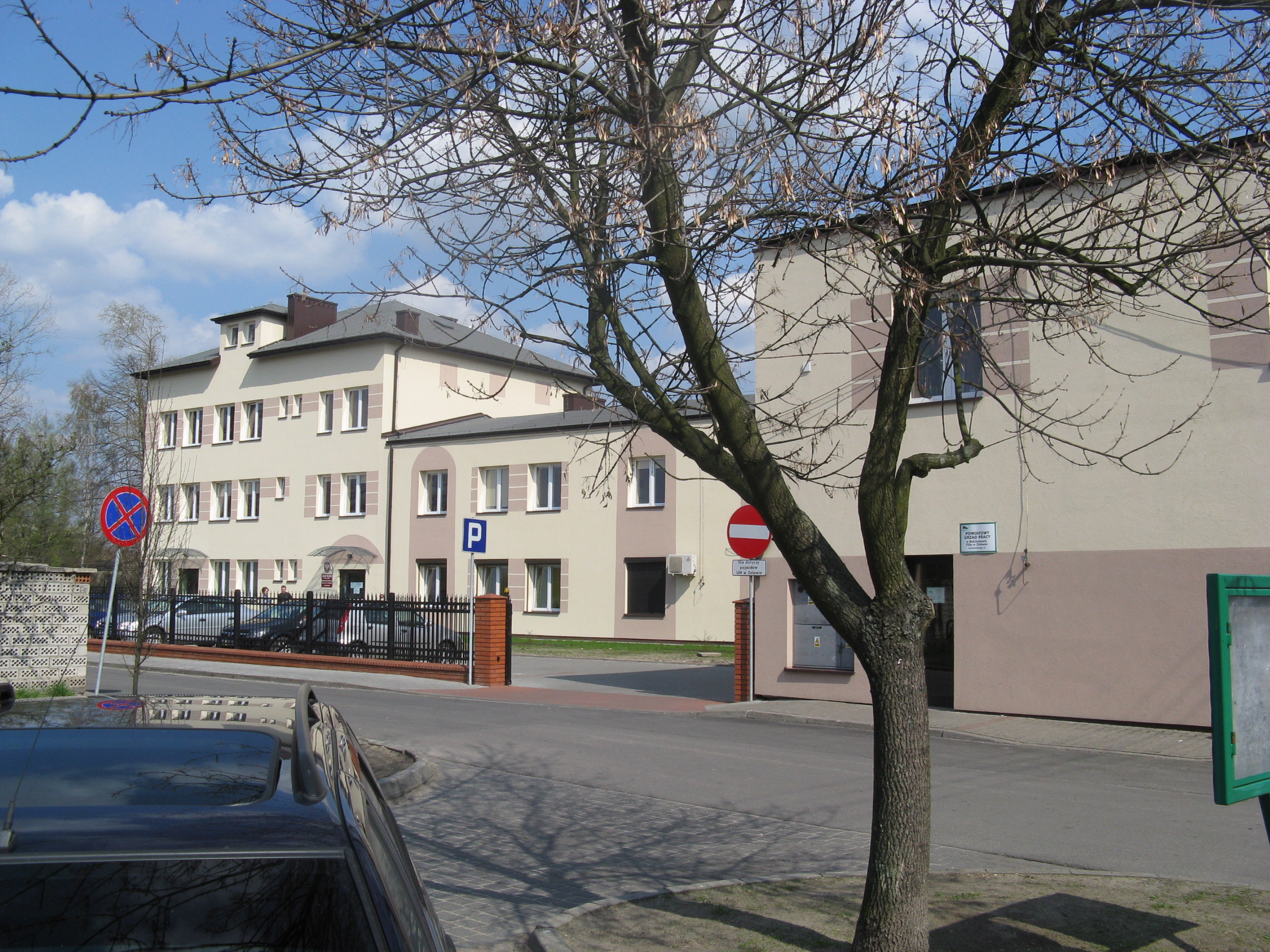
- Municipal hall

- Coat of arms
- Interactive map of Gmina Zelów
- Coordinates (Zelów): 51°28′N 19°13′E
- Country: Poland
- Voivodeship: Łódź
- County: Bełchatów
- Seat: Zelów

Area
  - Total: 168.21 km^{2} (64.95 sq mi)

Population (2006)
  - Total: 15,321
  - Density: 91.083/km^{2} (235.90/sq mi)
  - Urban: 8,173
  - Rural: 7,148
- Website: www.zelow.pl

Gmina Zelów is an urban-rural gmina (administrative district) in Bełchatów County, Łódź Voivodeship, in central Poland. Its seat is the town of Zelów, which lies approximately 16 kilometres (10 mi) north-west of Bełchatów and 40 km (25 mi) south-west of the regional capital Łódź.

The gmina covers an area of 168.21 square kilometres (64.9 sq mi), and as of 2006 its total population is 15,321 (of which the population of Zelów amounts to 8,173, and the population of the rural part of the gmina is 7,148).

== Villages ==
Apart from the town of Zelów, Gmina Zelów contains the villages and settlements of:

- Bocianicha
- Bujny Księże
- Bujny Szlacheckie
- Chajczyny
- Dąbrowa
- Faustynów
- Grabostów
- Grabostów-Bominy
- Grębociny
- Ignaców
- Jamborek
- Janów
- Jawor
- Karczmy
- Karczmy-Kolonia
- Kociszew
- Kociszew A
- Kolonia Grabostów
- Kolonia Kociszew
- Kolonia Ostoja
- Krześlów
- Kurów
- Kurówek
- Kuźnica
- Łęki
- Łęki-Kolonia
- Łobudzice
- Łobudzice-Kolonia
- Marszywiec
- Mauryców
- Nowa Wola
- Ostoja
- Pawłowa
- Podlesie
- Pożdżenice
- Pożdżenice-Kolonia
- Przecznia
- Pszczółki
- Pukawica
- Sobki
- Sromutka
- Tosin
- Walewice
- Wola Pszczółecka
- Wygiełzów
- Wypychów
- Zabłoty
- Zagłówki
- Zalesie
- Zelówek

== Neighbouring gminas ==
Gmina Zelów is bordered by the gminas of Bełchatów, Buczek, Dłutów, Drużbice, Kluki, Łask, Sędziejowice, Szczerców and Widawa.
