= Zabłoty =

- Village
- Location within Poland
- Coordinates: 51°31′N 19°16′E
- Country: Poland
- Voivodeship: Łódź
- County: Bełchatów
- Gmina: Zelów

Zabłoty [zaˈbwɔtɨ] is a village in the administrative district of Gmina Zelów, within Bełchatów County, Łódź Voivodeship, in central Poland.
