= Kociszew, Łódź Voivodeship =

Kociszew
- Village
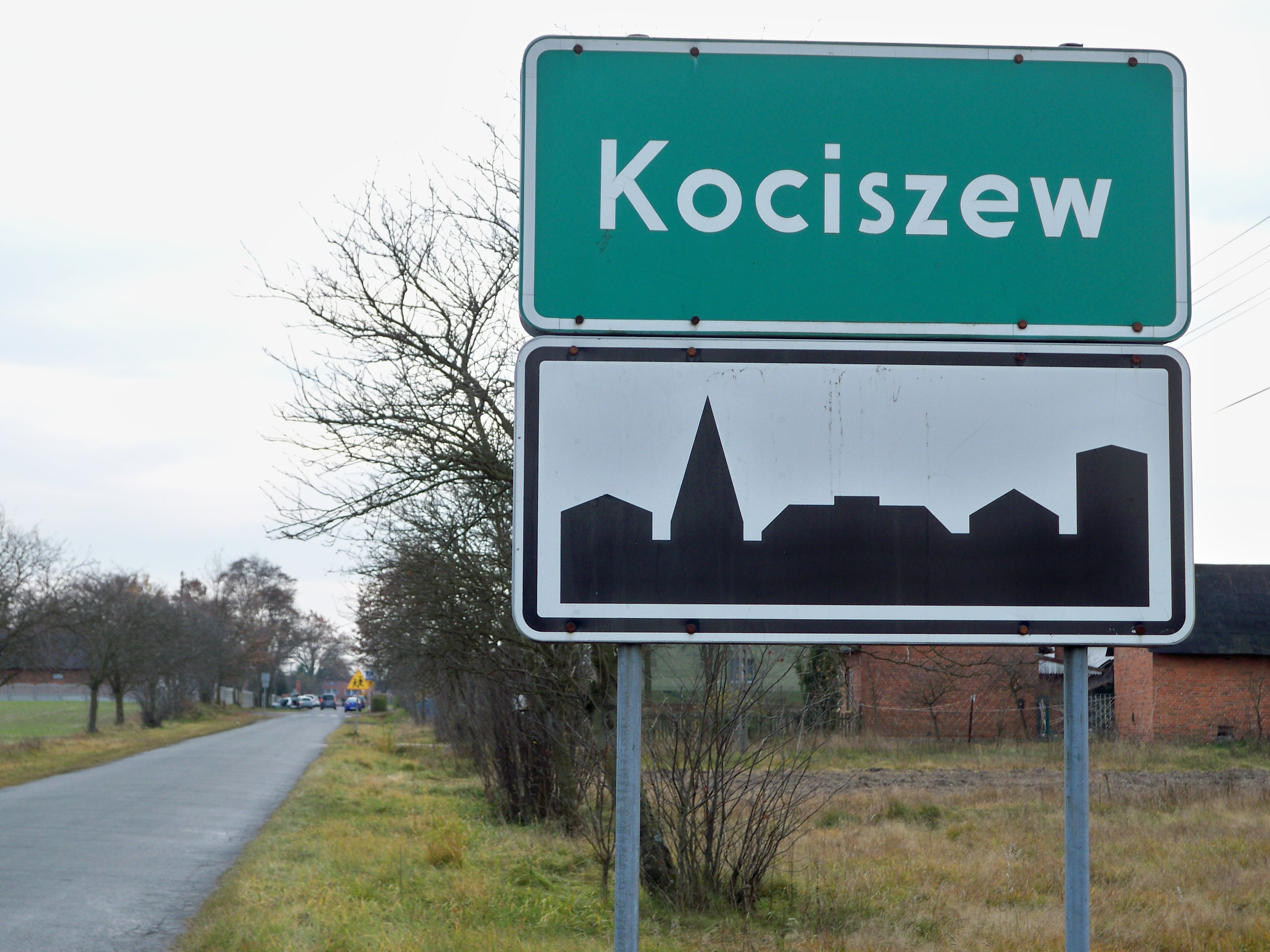

- Location within Poland
- Coordinates: 51°29′35″N 19°17′43″E
- Country: Poland
- Voivodeship: Łódź
- County: Bełchatów
- Gmina: Zelów

Kociszew [kɔˈt͡ɕiʂɛf] is a village in the administrative district of Gmina Zelów, within Bełchatów County, Łódź Voivodeship, in central Poland.
