= Tosin, Bełchatów County =

Tosin
- Village
- Location within Poland
- Coordinates: 51°26′18″N 19°11′49″E
- Country: Poland
- Voivodeship: Łódź
- County: Bełchatów
- Gmina: Zelów

Tosin [ˈtɔɕin] is a village in the administrative district of Gmina Zelów, within Bełchatów County, Łódź Voivodeship, in central Poland.
