= Przecznia =

- Village
- Location within Poland
- Coordinates: 51°25′50″N 19°7′10″E
- Country: Poland
- Voivodeship: Łódź
- County: Bełchatów
- Gmina: Zelów

Przecznia [ˈpʂɛt͡ʂɲa] is a village in the administrative district of Gmina Zelów, within Bełchatów County, Łódź Voivodeship, in central Poland.
