= Kuźnica Kaszewska =

- Village
- Location within Poland
- Coordinates: 51°18′N 19°17′E
- Country: Poland
- Voivodeship: Łódź
- County: Bełchatów
- Gmina: Kluki
- Population: 100

Kuźnica Kaszewska (Polish pronunciation: [kuʑˈɲit͡sa kaˈʂɛfska]) is a village in the administrative district of Gmina Kluki, within Bełchatów County, Łódź Voivodeship, in central Poland.
