= Grabostów-Bominy =

- Village
- Location within Poland
- Coordinates: 51°27′N 19°18′E
- Country: Poland
- Voivodeship: Łódź
- County: Bełchatów
- Gmina: Zelów

Grabostów-Bominy [ɡraˈbɔstuf bɔˈminɨ] is a village in the administrative district of Gmina Zelów, within Bełchatów County, Łódź Voivodeship, in central Poland.
