= Kolonia Kociszew =

- Village
- Location within Poland
- Coordinates: 51°29′14″N 19°17′14″E
- Country: Poland
- Voivodeship: Łódź
- County: Bełchatów
- Gmina: Zelów
- Population: 150

Kolonia Kociszew [kɔˈlɔɲa kɔˈt͡ɕiʂɛf] is a village in the administrative district of Gmina Zelów, within Bełchatów County, Łódź Voivodeship, in central Poland.
