= Pożdżenice-Kolonia =

- Village
- Location within Poland
- Coordinates: 51°28′1″N 19°10′56″E
- Country: Poland
- Voivodeship: Łódź
- County: Bełchatów
- Gmina: Zelów

Pożdżenice-Kolonia [pɔʐd͡ʐɛˈnit͡sɛ kɔˈlɔɲa] is a village in the administrative district of Gmina Zelów, within Bełchatów County, Łódź Voivodeship, in central Poland.
