= Sromutka =

- Village
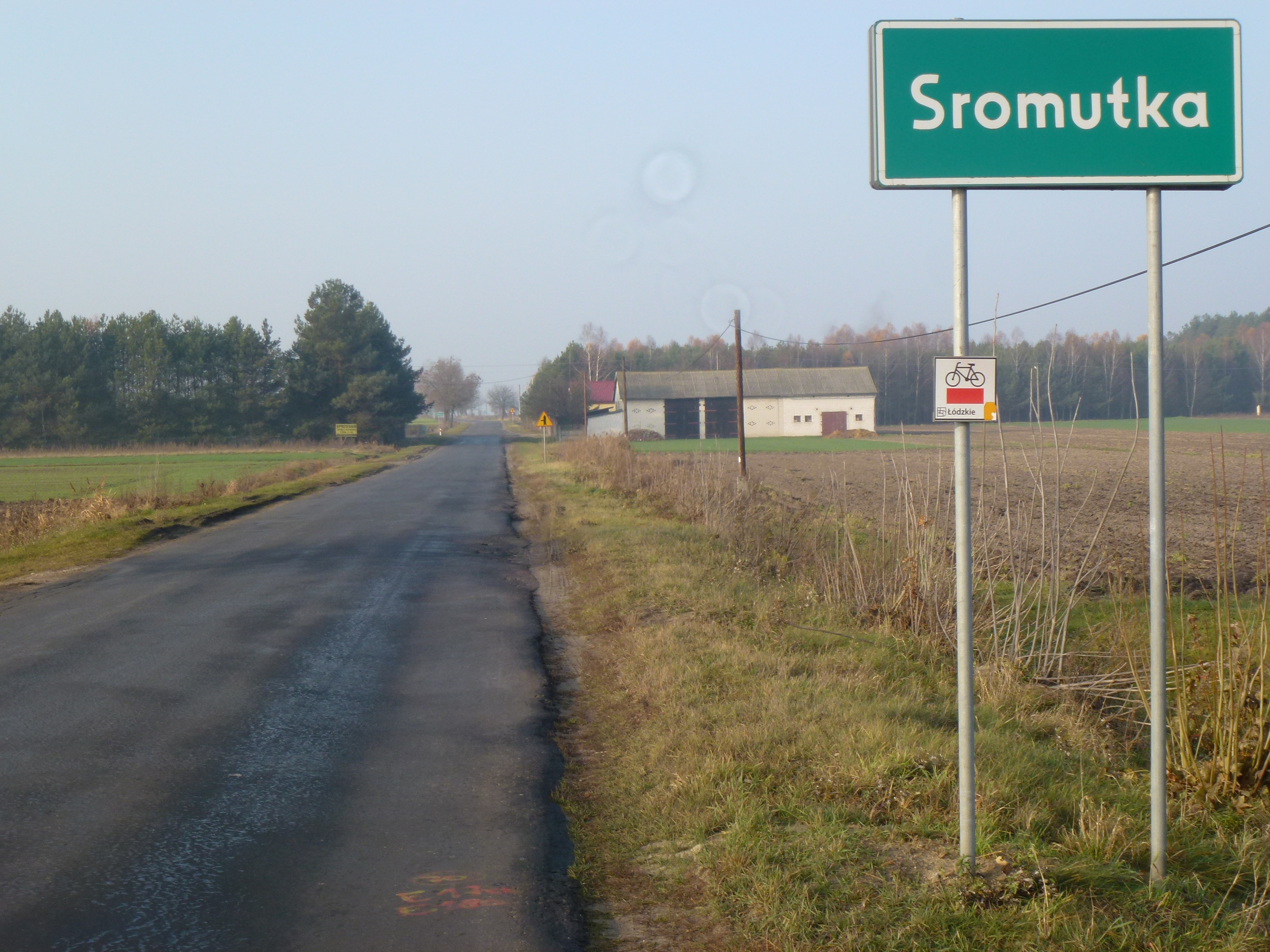

- Location within Poland
- Coordinates: 51°26′N 19°14′E
- Country: Poland
- Voivodeship: Łódź
- County: Bełchatów
- Gmina: Zelów

Sromutka [srɔˈmutka] is a village in the administrative district of Gmina Zelów, within Bełchatów County, Łódź Voivodeship, in central Poland.
