= Nowy Janów, Łódź Voivodeship =

Nowy Janów
- Village
- Location within Poland
- Coordinates: 51°17′N 19°18′E
- Country: Poland
- Voivodeship: Łódź
- County: Bełchatów
- Gmina: Kluki
- Population: 200

Nowy Janów [ˈnɔvɨ ˈjanuf] is a village in the administrative district of Gmina Kluki, within Bełchatów County, Łódź Voivodeship, in central Poland.
