= Dąbrowa, Gmina Zelów =

Dąbrowa
- Village
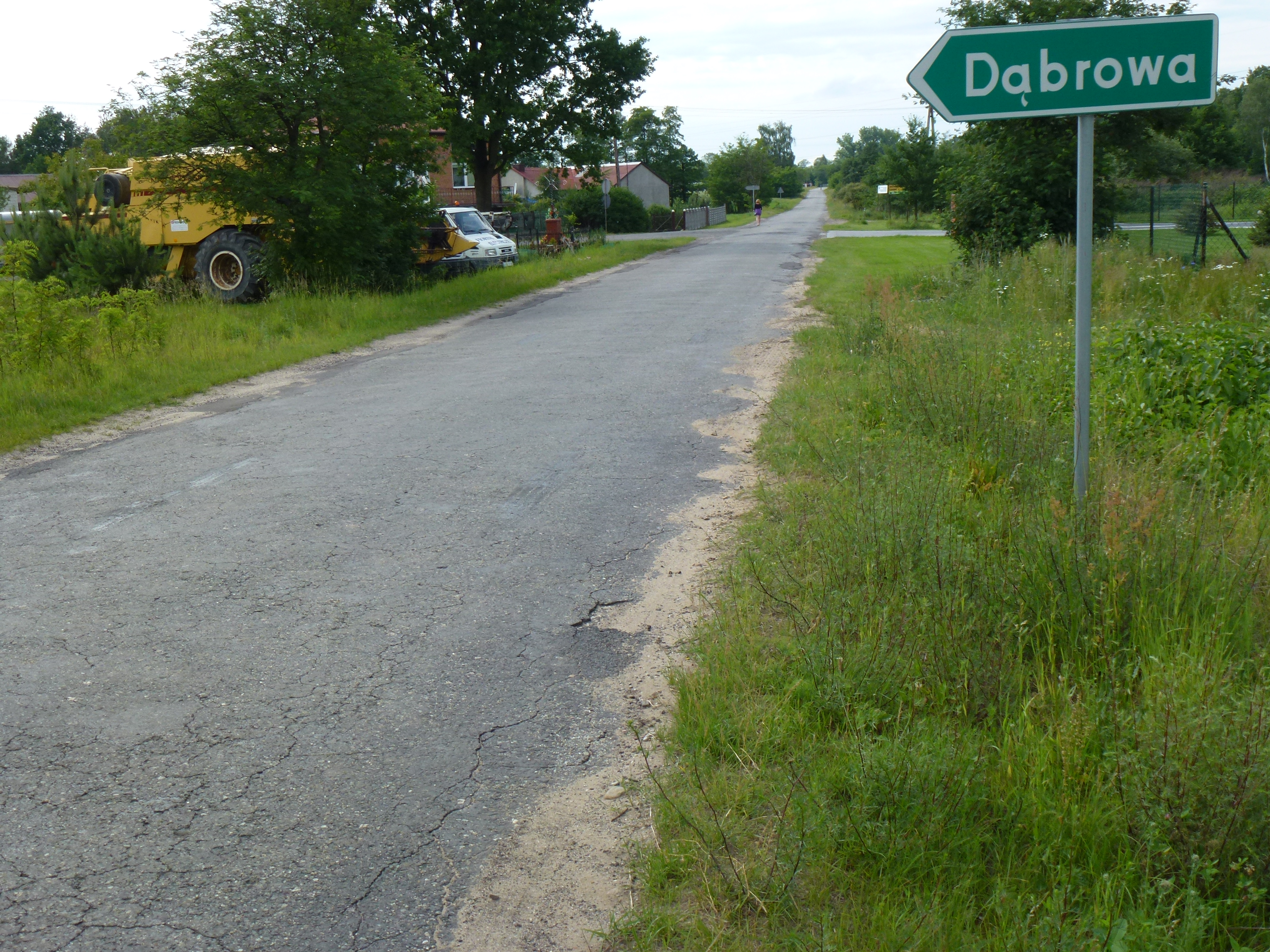
- Road sign leading to Dąbrowa

- Location within Poland
- Coordinates: 51°29′24″N 19°18′30″E
- Country: Poland
- Voivodeship: Łódź
- County: Bełchatów
- Gmina: Zelów

Dąbrowa [dɔmˈbrɔva] is a village in the administrative district of Gmina Zelów, within Bełchatów County, Łódź Voivodeship, in central Poland.
