= Kolonia Ostoja =

- Village
- Location within Poland
- Coordinates: 51°26′47″N 19°18′7″E
- Country: Poland
- Voivodeship: Łódź
- County: Bełchatów
- Gmina: Zelów

Kolonia Ostoja [kɔˈlɔɲa ɔsˈtɔja] is a village in the administrative district of Gmina Zelów, within Bełchatów County, Łódź Voivodeship, in central Poland.
