= Cisza, Łódź Voivodeship =

Cisza
- Village
- Location within Poland
- Coordinates: 51°22′N 19°13′E
- Country: Poland
- Voivodeship: Łódź
- County: Bełchatów
- Gmina: Kluki
- Population: 80

Cisza [ˈt͡ɕiʂa] is a village in the administrative district of Gmina Kluki, within Bełchatów County, Łódź Voivodeship, in central Poland.
