= Herbertów =

- District
- Location within Poland
- Coordinates: 51°28′32″N 19°12′08″E
- Country: Poland
- Voivodeship: Łódź
- County: Bełchatów
- Town: Zelów
- Time zone: UTC+1 (CET)
  - Summer (DST): UTC+2 (CEST)
- Vehicle registration: EBE

Herbertów [xɛrˈbɛrtuf] is a district of Zelów, Poland, located in the northwestern part of the town.

During the German occupation of Poland (World War II), a subcamp of the Nazi German prison in Sieradz was located in the Herbertów.
