= Łęki-Kolonia =

- Village
- Location within Poland
- Coordinates: 51°26′15″N 19°8′9″E
- Country: Poland
- Voivodeship: Łódź
- County: Bełchatów
- Gmina: Zelów
- Population: 150

Łęki-Kolonia (Polish pronunciation: [ˈwɛŋkʲi kɔˈlɔɲa]) is a village in the administrative district of Gmina Zelów, within Bełchatów County, Łódź Voivodeship, in central Poland.
