= Kolonia Grabostów =

- Settlement
- Location within Poland
- Coordinates: 51°28′N 19°19′E
- Country: Poland
- Voivodeship: Łódź
- County: Bełchatów
- Gmina: Zelów

Kolonia Grabostów [kɔˈlɔɲa ɡraˈbɔstuf] is a settlement in the administrative district of Gmina Zelów, within Bełchatów County, Łódź Voivodeship, in central Poland.
