= Kociszew A =

- Village
- Country: Poland
- Voivodeship: Łódź
- County: Bełchatów
- Gmina: Zelów

Kociszew A is a village in the administrative district of Gmina Zelów, within Bełchatów County, Łódź Voivodeship, in central Poland.
