= Karczmy-Kolonia =

- Village
- Location within Poland
- Coordinates: 51°32′37″N 19°16′32″E
- Country: Poland
- Voivodeship: Łódź
- County: Bełchatów
- Gmina: Zelów
- Population: 60

Karczmy-Kolonia [ˈkart͡ʂmɨ kɔˈlɔɲa] is a village in the administrative district of Gmina Zelów, within Bełchatów County, Łódź Voivodeship, in central Poland.
