= Żelichów, Łódź Voivodeship =

Żelichów
- Village
- Location within Poland
- Coordinates: 51°18′53″N 19°15′9″E
- Country: Poland
- Voivodeship: Łódź
- County: Bełchatów
- Gmina: Kluki

Żelichów [ʐɛˈlixuf] is a village in the administrative district of Gmina Kluki, within Bełchatów County, Łódź Voivodeship, in central Poland.
