= Nowa Wola, Gmina Zelów =

Nowa Wola
- Village
- Location within Poland
- Coordinates: 51°28′0″N 19°9′46″E
- Country: Poland
- Voivodeship: Łódź
- County: Bełchatów
- Gmina: Zelów

Nowa Wola [ˈnɔva ˈvɔla] is a village in the administrative district of Gmina Zelów, within Bełchatów County, Łódź Voivodeship, in central Poland.
