= Walewice (disambiguation) =

Walewice may refer to the following places:

- Walewice in Łódź Voivodeship (central Poland)
- Walewice, Bełchatów County in Łódź Voivodeship (central Poland)
- Walewice, Lubusz Voivodeship (west Poland)
