= Podlesie, Bełchatów County =

Podlesie
- Village
- Location within Poland
- Coordinates: 51°25′6″N 19°9′40″E
- Country: Poland
- Voivodeship: Łódź
- County: Bełchatów
- Gmina: Zelów

Podlesie [pɔdˈlɛɕɛ] is a village in the administrative district of Gmina Zelów, within Bełchatów County, Łódź Voivodeship, in central Poland.
