= Strzyżewice =

Strzyżewice may refer to the following places:

- Strzyżewice, Greater Poland Voivodeship (west-central Poland)
- Strzyżewice, Łódź Voivodeship (central Poland)
- Strzyżewice, Lublin Voivodeship (east Poland)
