= Osina =

Osina may refer to:

== People ==
- Pesach Osina, American politician

== Places ==
=== Bulgaria ===
- Osina, Blagoevgrad Province

=== Nigeria ===
- Osina, Ideato North, Imo State

=== Poland ===
- Osina, Łódź Voivodeship
- Osina, Lublin Voivodeship
- Osina, Goleniów County, West Pomeranian Voivodeship
- Osina, Myślibórz County, West Pomeranian Voivodeship
- Gmina Osina, Goleniów County, West Pomeranian Voivodeship

== See also ==
- Ozina
