= Ostoja =

Ostoja (Serbian Cyrillic: Остоја) may refer to:

- Ostoja, Łódź Voivodeship, a village in Poland
- Ostoja, West Pomeranian Voivodeship, a village in Poland
- Clan of Ostoja, a late medieval European clan
- Ostoja coat of arms
- Ostoja, masculine given name
  - Ostoja Rajaković, Serbian medieval nobleman
  - Ostoja Stjepanović, Macedonian footballer
  - Stephen Ostoja of Bosnia, Bosnian king
- Joseph Stanislaus Ostoja-Kotkowski, Australian artist

== See also ==
- Ostojić
