= Biskupski =

Biskupski (feminine: Biskupska; plural: Biskupscy) is a Polish-language surname, derived from biskup meaning "bishop". It may refer to:

- Eugeniusz Biskupski (1947–2010), Polish athlete
- Jackie Biskupski (born 1966), American politician
- Mieczysław B. Biskupski, Polish-American historian

== See also ==
- Vasili Biskupsky, Russian general
