= Jawor, Bełchatów County =

Village in Poland

Jawor
- Village
- Location within Poland
- Coordinates: 51°27′9″N 19°5′27″E
- Country: Poland
- Voivodeship: Łódź
- County: Bełchatów
- Gmina: Zelów

Jawor [ˈjavɔr] is a small village in the administrative district of Gmina Zelów, within Bełchatów County, Łódź Voivodeship, in central Poland.
