= Kurówek =

- Village
- Location within Poland
- Coordinates: 51°27′20″N 19°9′2″E
- Country: Poland
- Voivodeship: Łódź
- County: Bełchatów
- Gmina: Zelów
- Population: 210

Kurówek [kuˈruvɛk] is a village in the administrative district of Gmina Zelów, within Bełchatów County, Łódź Voivodeship, in central Poland.
