= Łęki, Łódź Voivodeship =

Łęki
- Village
- Location within Poland
- Coordinates: 51°25′45″N 19°8′15″E
- Country: Poland
- Voivodeship: Łódź
- County: Bełchatów
- Gmina: Zelów

Łęki [ˈwɛŋkʲi] is a village in the administrative district of Gmina Zelów, within Bełchatów County, Łódź Voivodeship, in central Poland.
