= Łobudzice-Kolonia =

- Village
- Location within Poland
- Coordinates: 51°26′55″N 19°15′49″E
- Country: Poland
- Voivodeship: Łódź
- County: Bełchatów
- Gmina: Zelów

Łobudzice-Kolonia [wɔbuˈd͡ʑit͡sɛ kɔˈlɔɲa] is a village in the administrative district of Gmina Zelów, within Bełchatów County, Łódź Voivodeship, in central Poland.
