= Zalesie, Gmina Zelów =

Zalesie
- Village
- Location within Poland
- Coordinates: 51°26′26″N 19°6′21″E
- Country: Poland
- Voivodeship: Łódź
- County: Bełchatów
- Gmina: Zelów

Zalesie [zaˈlɛɕɛ] is a village in the administrative district of Gmina Zelów, within Bełchatów County, Łódź Voivodeship, in central Poland.
