= Pszczółki =

Pszczółki may refer to the following places:

- Pszczółki, Łódź Voivodeship (central Poland)
- Pszczółki, Pomeranian Voivodeship (north Poland)
- Pszczółki, Warmian-Masurian Voivodeship (north Poland)
