= Pożdżenice =

- Village
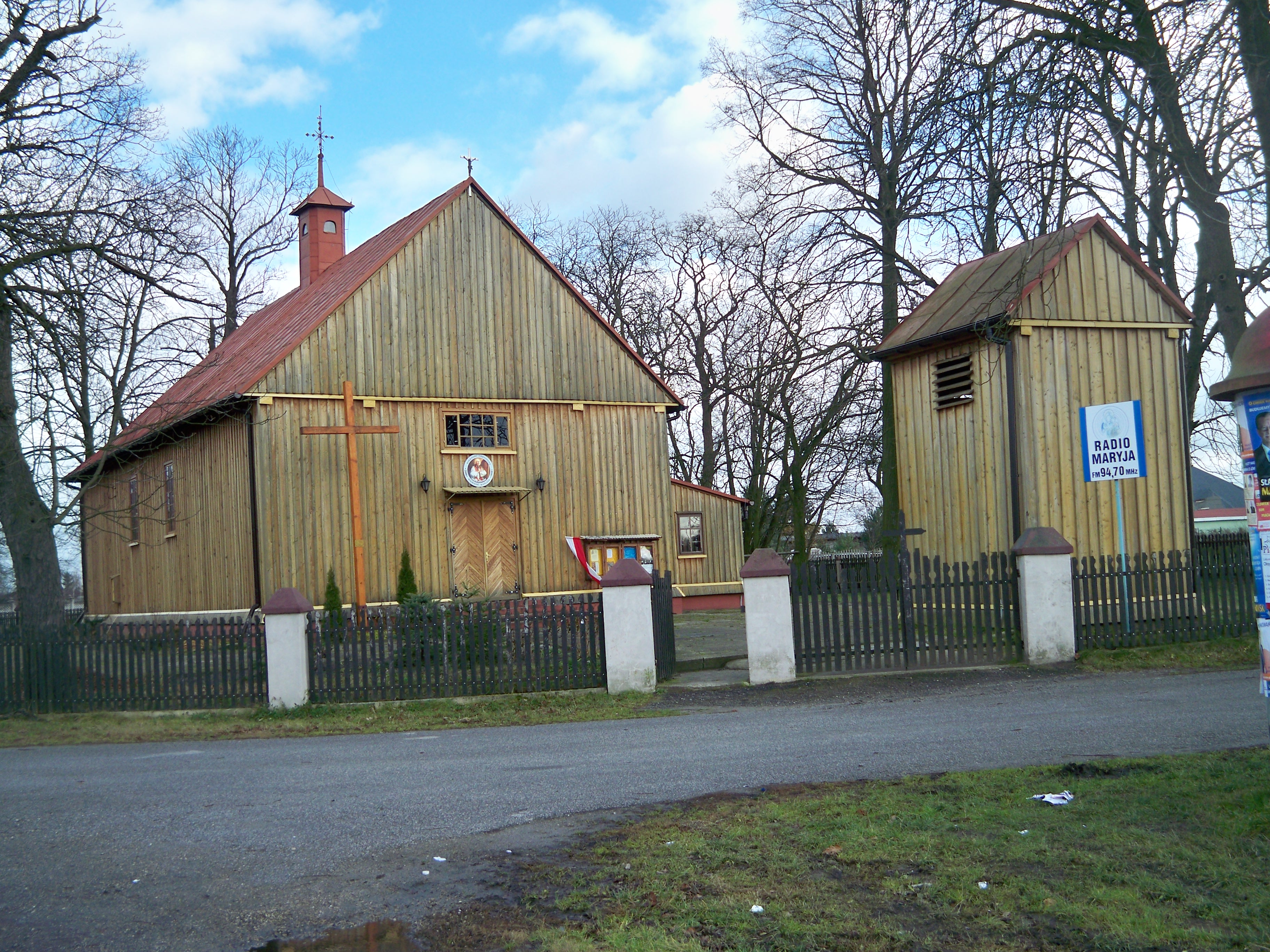
- Church of Saints Casimir and Barbara

- Location within Poland
- Coordinates: 51°27′2″N 19°11′11″E
- Country: Poland
- Voivodeship: Łódź
- County: Bełchatów
- Gmina: Zelów

Pożdżenice [pɔʐd͡ʐɛˈnit͡sɛ] is a village in the administrative district of Gmina Zelów, within Bełchatów County, Łódź Voivodeship, in central Poland.
