= Kluki, Łódź Voivodeship =

Kluki
- Village
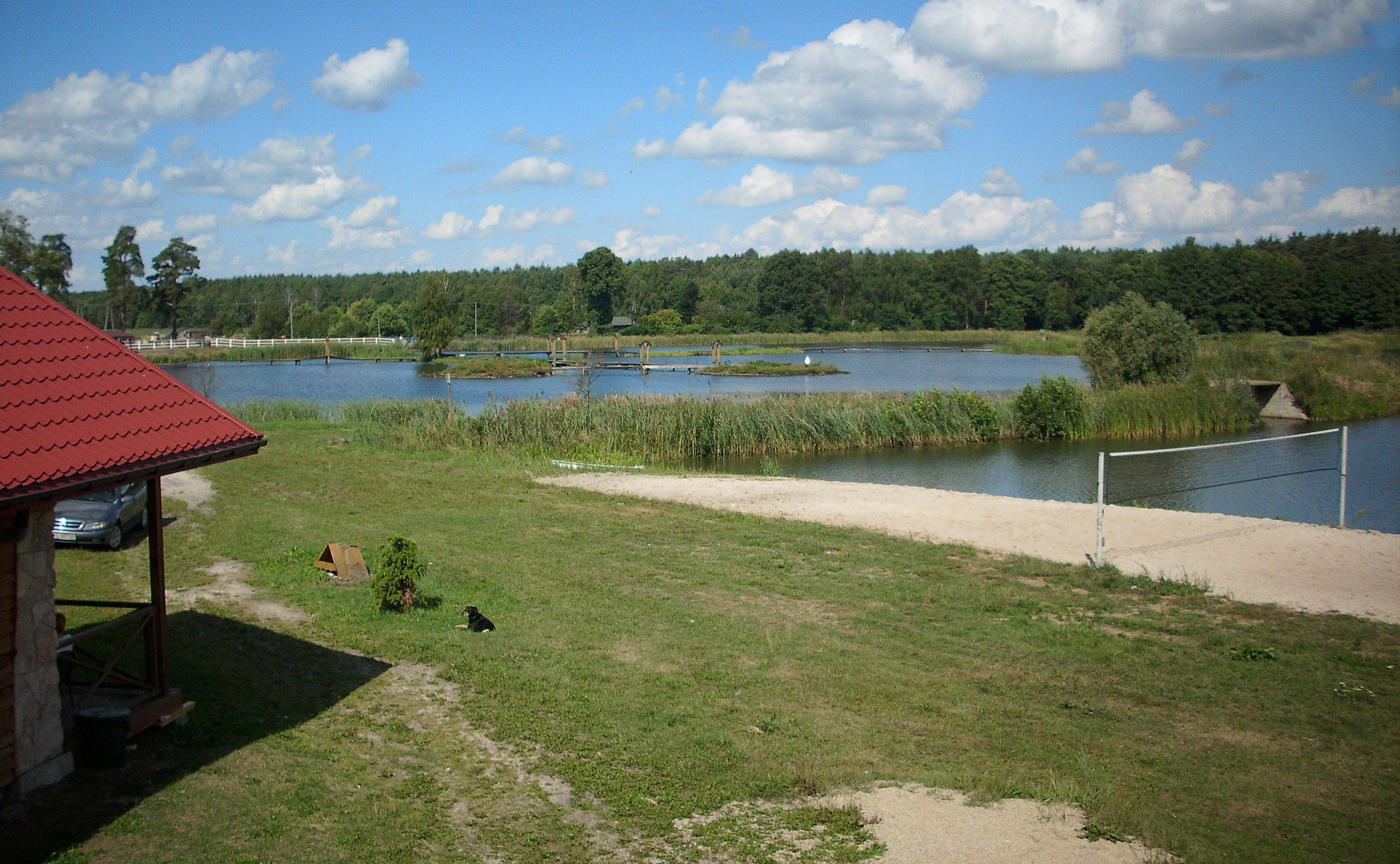

- Location within Poland
- Coordinates: 51°21′N 19°14′E
- Country: Poland
- Voivodeship: Łódź
- County: Bełchatów
- Gmina: Kluki
- Population: 750
- Website: http://www.kluki.pl/

Kluki [ˈkluki] is a village in Bełchatów County, Łódź Voivodeship, in central Poland. It is the seat of the gmina (administrative district) called Gmina Kluki.
