= Osina, Łódź Voivodeship =

Osina
- Village
- Location within Poland
- Coordinates: 51°21′N 19°11′E
- Country: Poland
- Voivodeship: Łódź
- County: Bełchatów
- Gmina: Kluki
- Population: 310

Osina [ɔˈɕina] is a village in the administrative district of Gmina Kluki, within Bełchatów County, Łódź Voivodeship, in central Poland.
