= Pszczółki, Łódź Voivodeship =

Pszczółki
- Village
- Location within Poland
- Coordinates: 51°25′18″N 19°6′6″E
- Country: Poland
- Voivodeship: Łódź
- County: Bełchatów
- Gmina: Zelów

Pszczółki [ˈpʂt͡ʂuu̯ki] is a village in the administrative district of Gmina Zelów, within Bełchatów County, Łódź Voivodeship, in central Poland.
