= Walewice, Bełchatów County =

Polish village in Łódź Voivodeship, central Poland

Walewice
- Village
- Location within Poland
- Coordinates: 51°25′16″N 19°7′34″E
- Country: Poland
- Voivodeship: Łódź
- County: Bełchatów
- Gmina: Zelów

Walewice [valɛˈvit͡sɛ] is a village in the administrative district of Gmina Zelów, within Bełchatów County, Łódź Voivodeship, in central Poland.
