= Eugeniusz Biskupski =

Polish triple jumper (1947–2010)

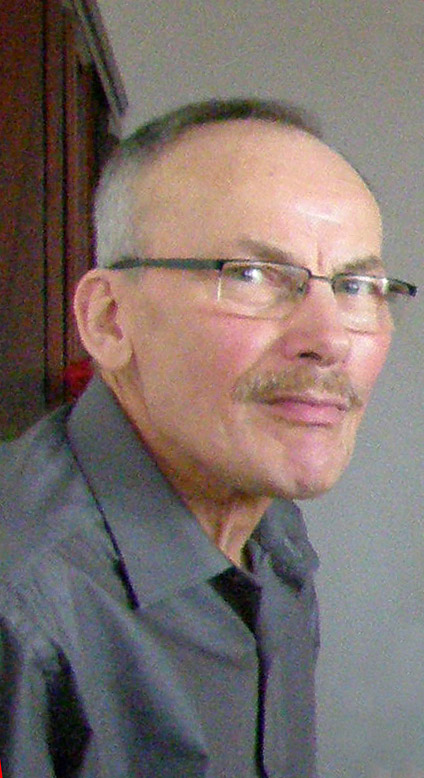
Eugeniusz Biskupski, 2009.

Eugeniusz Biskupski (17 December 1947 – 10 September 2010) was a Polish triple jumper.

He was born in Karczmy and represented the club Legia Warszawa. He finished seventh at the 1966 European Junior Championships, eleventh at the 1972 European Indoor Championships, sixth at the 1975 European Indoor Championships, ninth at the 1976 European Indoor Championships, seventh at the 1976 Olympic Games and tenth at the 1978 European Championships.

He became Polish champion in 1977 and 1979, rivalling with Michał Joachimowski, and Polish indoor champion in 1978. His personal best jump was 16.73 metres, achieved in 1975.
