= Ignaców, Bełchatów County =

Ignaców
- Village
- Location within Poland
- Coordinates: 51°29′N 19°9′E
- Country: Poland
- Voivodeship: Łódź
- County: Bełchatów
- Gmina: Zelów
- Time zone: UTC+1 (CET)
  - Summer (DST): UTC+2 (CEST)
- Vehicle registration: EBE

Ignaców [iɡˈnat͡suf] is a village in the administrative district of Gmina Zelów, within Bełchatów County, Łódź Voivodeship, in central Poland. It is located in the historic Sieradz Land.

According to the 1921 census, the village had a population of 235, entirely Polish by nationality.
