= Ostojić =

Ostojić or Ostoich (Serbian Cyrillic: Остојић) is a South Slavic surname derived from a masculine given name Ostoja. It may refer to:

- Arsen Anton Ostojić (born 1965), Croatian film director
- Bojan Ostojić (born 1984), Serbian football player
- Đuro Ostojić (born 1976), Montenegrin professional basketball player
- Esteban Ostojich (born 1982), Uruguayan football referee
- Ljubica Ostojić (1945–2021), writer and poet from Bosnia-Herzegovina
- Néstor Kirchner Ostoich (1950–2010), Argentine politician
- Predrag Ostojić (1938–1996), Yugoslav chess Grandmaster
- Radivoje Ostojić, Yugoslav basketball player
- Rajko Ostojić (born 1962), Croatian politician
- Stephen Ostojić of Bosnia, King of Bosnia from 1418 to 1421
- Stevan Ostojić (1941–2022), Serbian football player, as forward and also football manager
- Tanja Ostojić (born 1972), Serbian feminist performance artist
- Zaharije Ostojić (1907–1945), Montenegrin Serb Chetnik commander
