= Strzyżewice, Łódź Voivodeship =

Strzyżewice
- Village
- Location within Poland
- Coordinates: 51°24′N 19°14′E
- Country: Poland
- Voivodeship: Łódź
- County: Bełchatów
- Gmina: Kluki
- Population: 300

Strzyżewice [stʂɨʐɛˈvit͡sɛ] is a village in the administrative district of Gmina Kluki, within Bełchatów County, Łódź Voivodeship, in central Poland.
