= Karczmy =

- Village
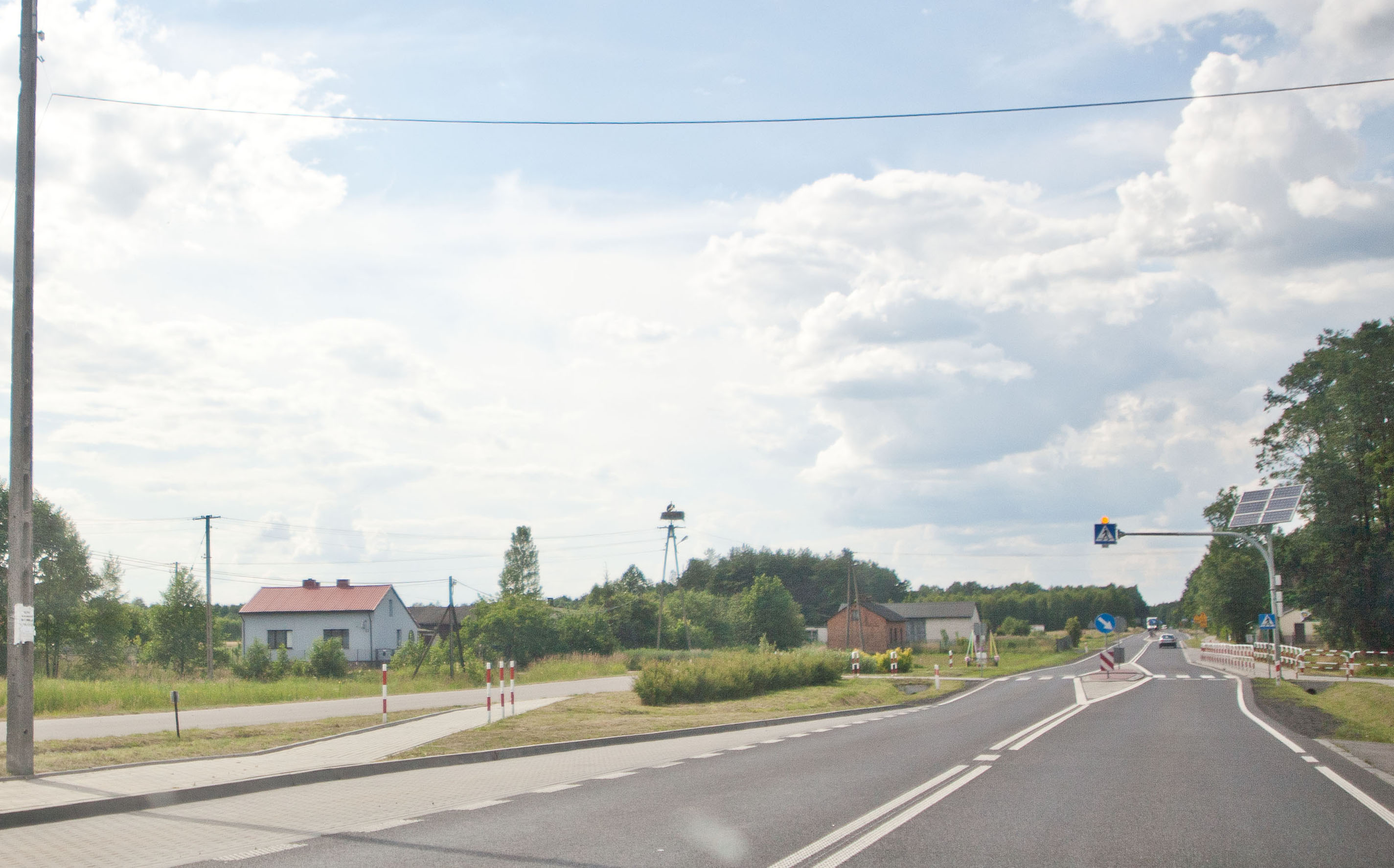

- Location within Poland
- Coordinates: 51°31′35″N 19°16′49″E
- Country: Poland
- Voivodeship: Łódź
- County: Bełchatów
- Gmina: Zelów

Karczmy [ˈkart͡ʂmɨ] is a village in the administrative district of Gmina Zelów, within Bełchatów County, Łódź Voivodeship, in central Poland.
