= Ostoja, Łódź Voivodeship =

Ostoja
- Village
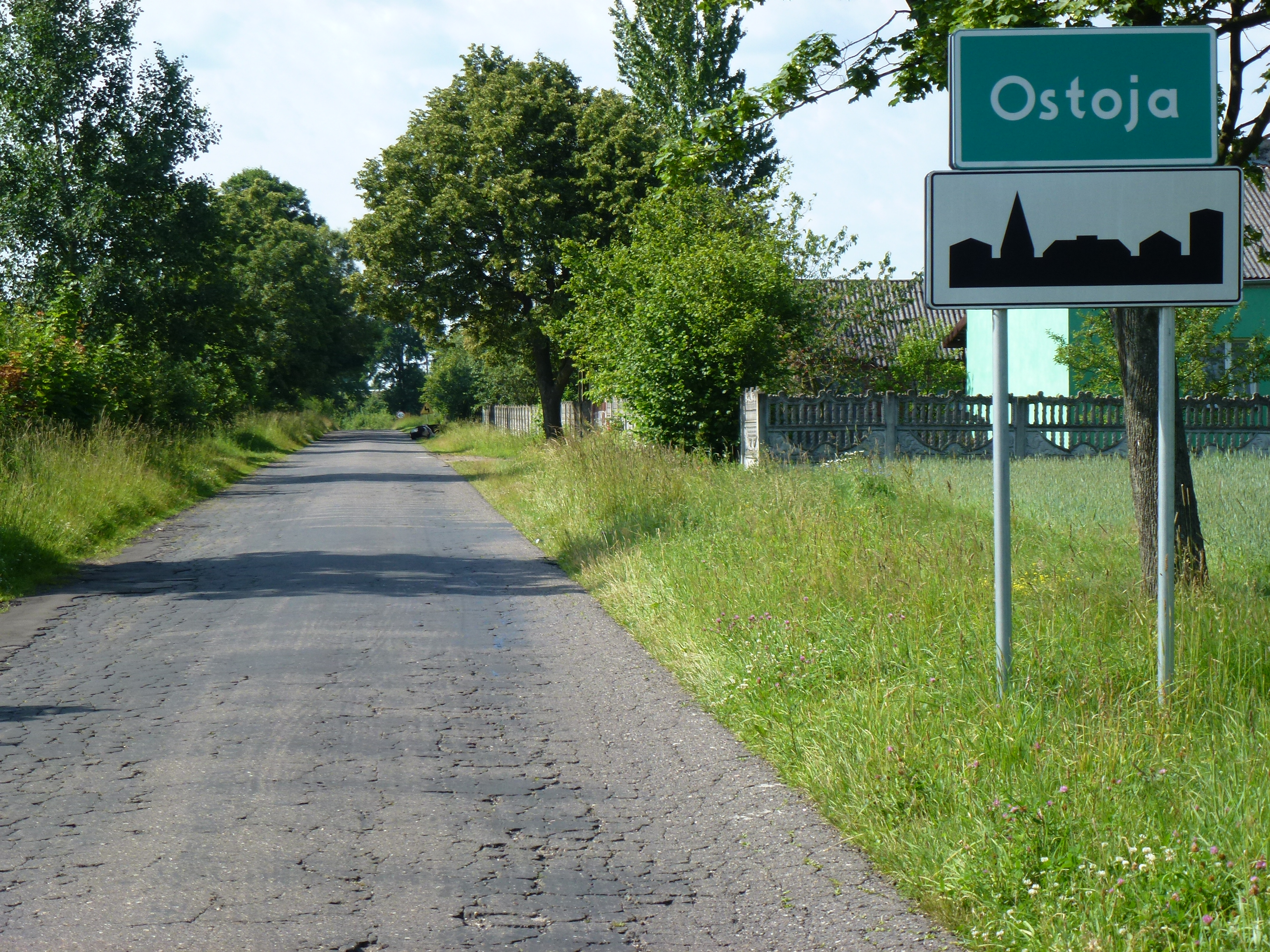

- Location within Poland
- Coordinates: 51°27′3″N 19°18′53″E
- Country: Poland
- Voivodeship: Łódź
- County: Bełchatów
- Gmina: Zelów

Ostoja [ɔsˈtɔja] is a village in the administrative district of Gmina Zelów, within Bełchatów County, Łódź Voivodeship, in central Poland.
