= Gmina Kluki =

Gmina Kluki Kluki Commune
- Gmina
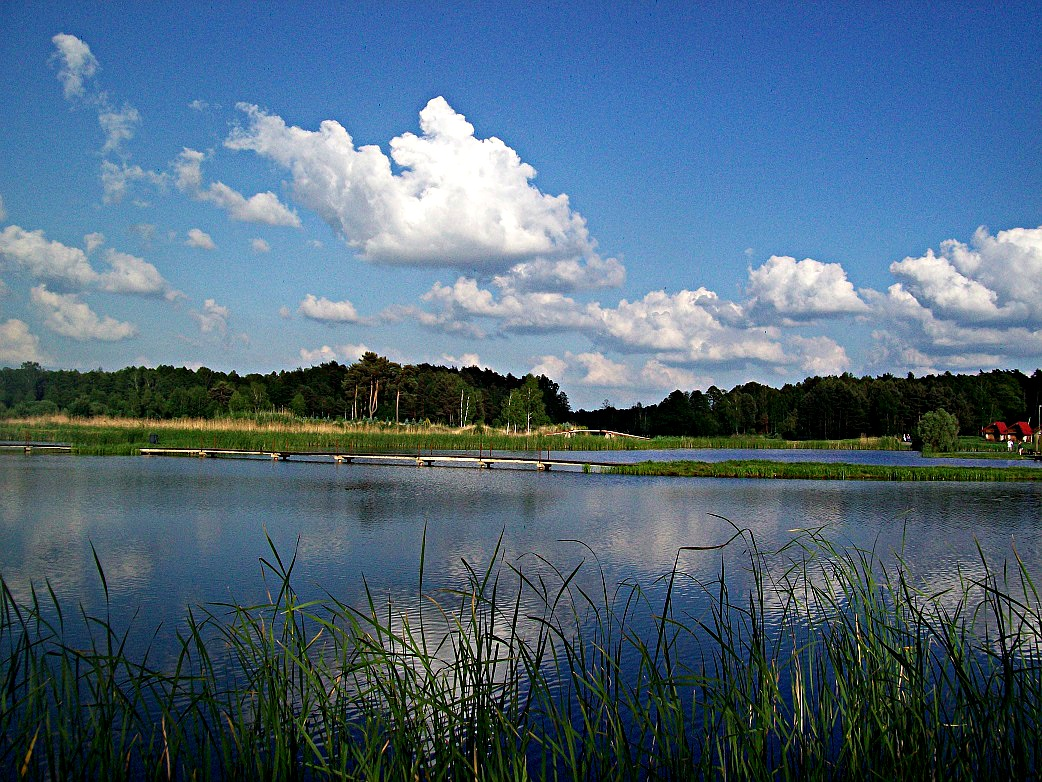

- Flag Coat of arms
- Interactive map of Gmina Kluki
- Coordinates (Kluki): 51°21′N 19°14′E
- Country: Poland
- Voivodeship: Łódź
- County: Bełchatów
- Seat: Kluki

Area
  - Total: 118.5 km^{2} (45.8 sq mi)

Population (2006)
  - Total: 3,949
  - Density: 33.32/km^{2} (86.31/sq mi)
- Time zone: UTC+1 (CET)
  - Summer (DST): UTC+2 (CEST)
- Website: www.kluki.pl

Gmina Kluki is a rural gmina (administrative district) in Bełchatów County, Łódź Voivodeship, in central Poland. Its seat is the village of Kluki, which lies approximately 10 kilometres (6 mi) west of Bełchatów and 51 km (32 mi) south of the regional capital Łódź.

The gmina covers an area of 118.5 square kilometres (45.8 sq mi), and as of 2006 its total population is 3,949.

== Villages ==
Gmina Kluki contains the villages and settlements of:

- Cisza
- Imielnia
- Kaszewice
- Kluki
- Kuźnica Kaszewska
- Nowy Janów
- Osina
- Parzno
- Podwódka
- Roździn
- Ścichawa
- Strzyżewice
- Trząs
- Wierzchy Kluckie
- Żar
- Zarzecze
- Żelichów

== Neighbouring gminas ==
Gmina Kluki is bordered by the gminas of Bełchatów, Kleszczów, Szczerców and Zelów.
