= Pawłowa, Łódź Voivodeship =

Pawłowa
- Village
- Location within Poland
- Coordinates: 51°29′24.1″N 19°19′13.8″E
- Country: Poland
- Voivodeship: Rzeszów
- County: Przeworsk
- Gmina: Adamówka

Pawłowa [paˈvwɔva] is a village in the administrative district of Adamówka, within Przeworsk County, Rzeszów Voivodeship, in central Poland.
