= Czechs in Poland =

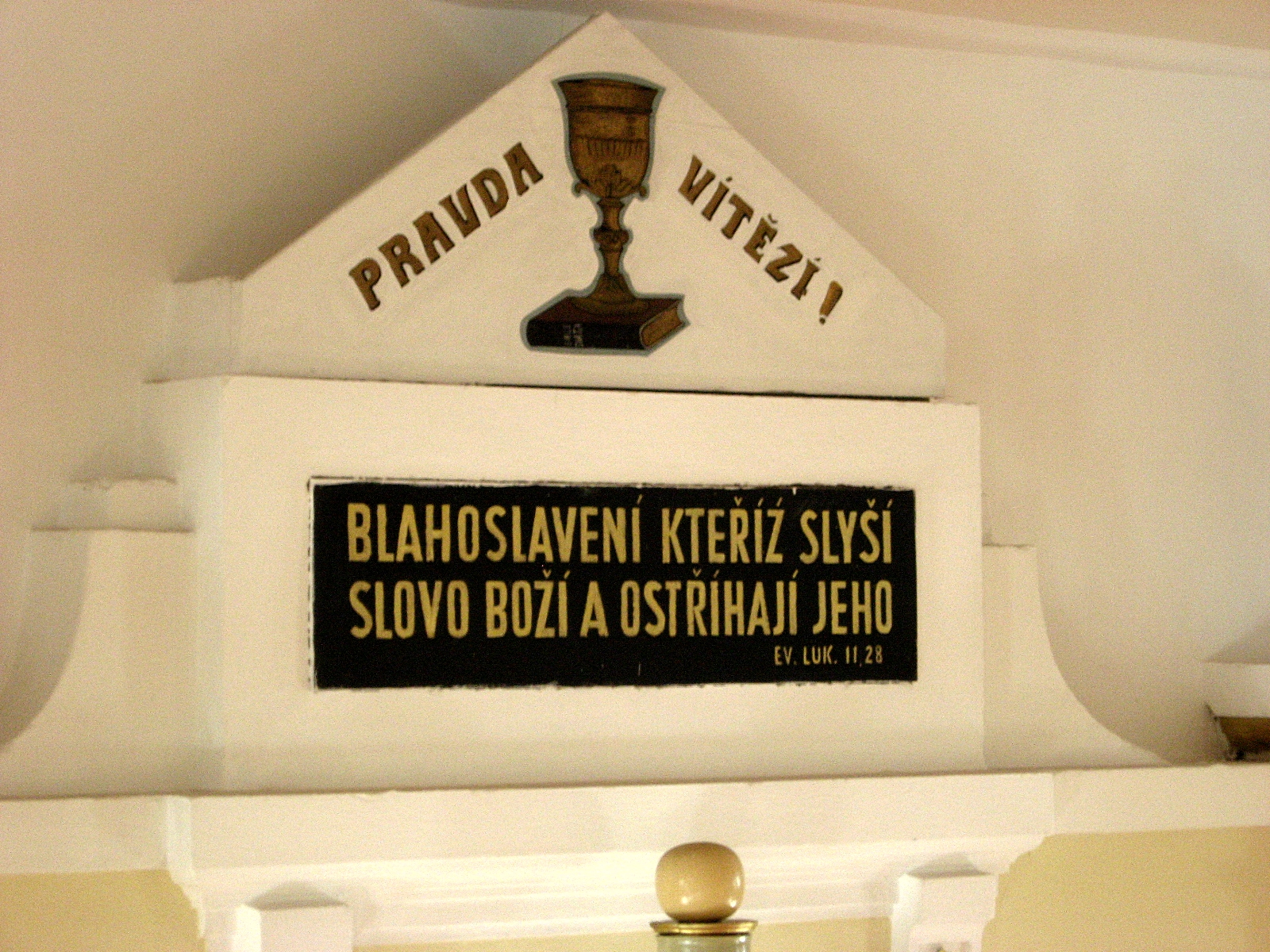
- Czech inscription in Zelów's Polish Reformed Church.

Total population
- 7,818 (2021)

Regions with significant populations
- Cieszyn Silesia, Łódź Voivodeship, Warsaw, Kłodzko County

Languages
- Czech, Polish

Religion
- Irreligion (majority) · Roman Catholic (minority)

Related ethnic groups
- Czechs

Czechs in Poland form a small minority of 3,447, according to the 2011 census, up from 386 in 2002. Minority of 7,818 according to the 2021 census. Czech presence in Poland dates back several centuries, with more numerous migration to Poland starting in the early modern period.

Most of them reside in and around Zelów (81, in Łódź Voivodeship), in the Czech Corner within the southwest portion of Kłodzko County (47, in Lower Silesian Voivodeship) and in the Polish sections of Cieszyn Silesia (61). Some live in Warsaw.

== History ==
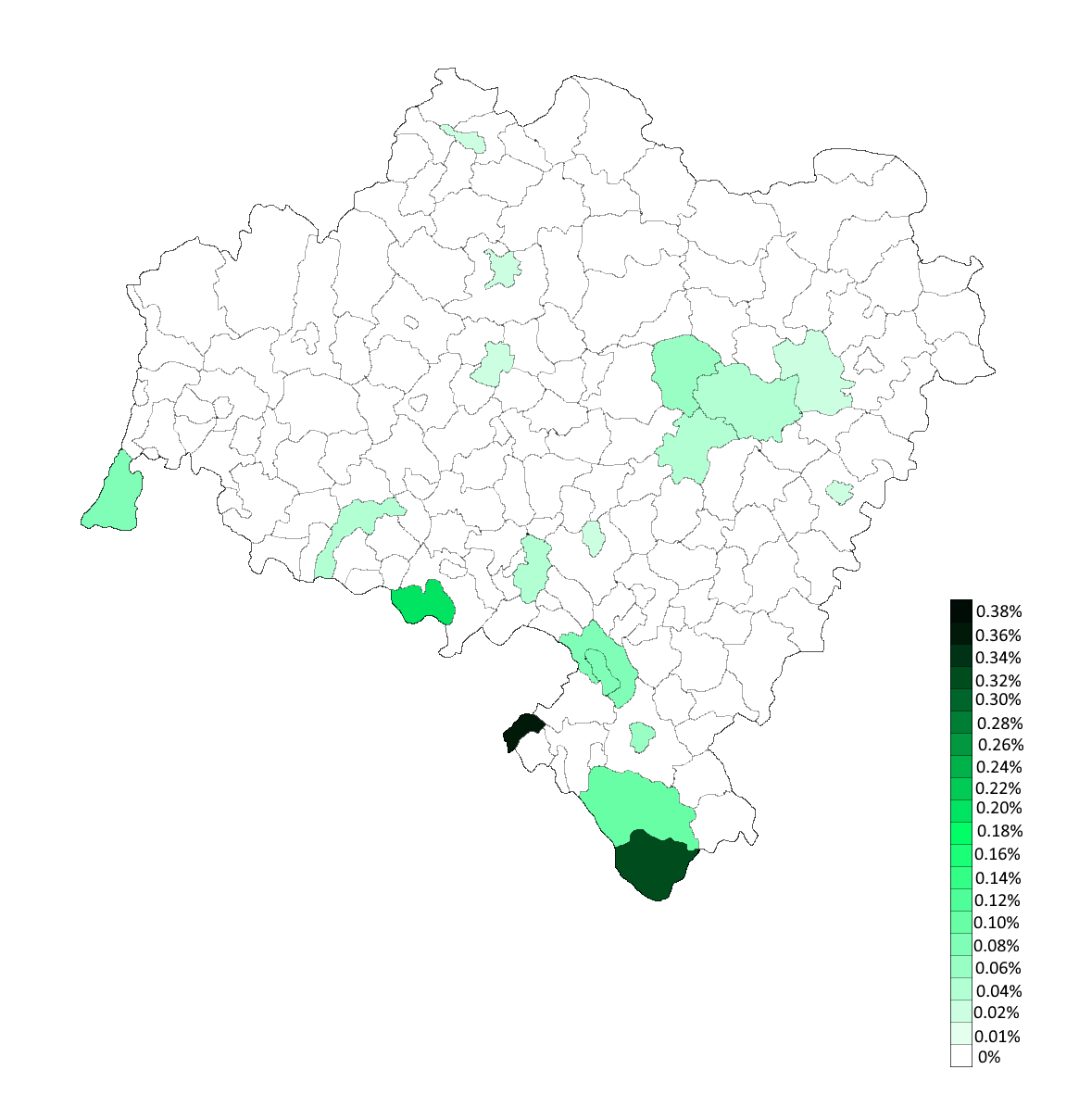
Distribution of Czechs in the Lower Silesian Voivodeship, bordering the Czech Republic

After the Bohemian loss to Austria at the Battle of White Mountain of 1620, many Czechs adhering to the Moravian Church fled subsequent Austrian Catholic persecution to Poland. The main center of Czechs in Poland became Leszno. Notable Czech refugee in Poland was philosopher John Amos Comenius. A notable remnant of the Czech Protestants in Poland are the files and library of the Unity of the Brethren from Leszno, now held at the State Archive and Raczyński Library in Poznań and the Kórnik Library in Kórnik, and listed on the UNESCO Memory of the World Register.

In the 19th century, Czechs also settled in Zelów and its environs and in Volhynia. Czechs of Kwasiłów in Volhynia founded a local branch of the Sokol movement in 1911, which formed part of the Polish Sokół movement. Within interwar Poland, the main centers of Czechs were Zelów and Kwasiłów in the Wołyń Voivodeship (1.5%). After the war many Czechs of Volhynia were expelled by the Soviet Union, and forcibly resettled in Czechoslovakia.

== Czechs in Poland and Poles of Czech descent ==
- Aleksander Augezdecky
- Josef František
- Wlastimil Hofman
- Gustaw Holoubek
- Jan Jelínek
- Jan Ámos Komenský
- Franciszek Krajowski
- Jan Matejko
- Igor Newerly
- Leopold Staff
- Jan Styka
- Ludvík Svoboda
- Karol Szajnocha
- Wojciech Żywny

== See also ==
- Czech Republic–Poland relations
- Czech diaspora
- Immigration to Poland
- Polish minority in the Czech Republic
