= Bełchatów County =

Bełchatów County Powiat bełchatowski
- County
- Flag Coat of arms

- Location within the voivodeship
- Coordinates (Bełchatów): 51°22′N 19°22′E
- Country: Poland
- Voivodeship: Łódź
- Seat: Bełchatów
- Gminas: Total 8 (incl. 1 urban): Bełchatów; Gmina Bełchatów; Gmina Drużbice; Gmina Kleszczów; Gmina Kluki; Gmina Rusiec; Gmina Szczerców; Gmina Zelów

Area
  - Total: 969.21 km^{2} (374.21 sq mi)

Population (2006)
  - Total: 112,640
  - Density: 116.22/km^{2} (301.00/sq mi)
  - Urban: 70,235
  - Rural: 42,405
- Car plates: EBE
- Website: www.powiat-belchatowski.pl

Bełchatów County (Polish: powiat bełchatowski) is a unit of territorial administration and local government (powiat) in Łódź Voivodeship, central Poland. It came into being on January 1, 1999, as a result of the Polish local government reforms passed in 1998. Its administrative seat and largest town is Bełchatów, which lies 47 kilometres (29 mi) south of the regional capital Łódź. The only other town in the county is Zelów, lying 16 km (10 mi) north-west of Bełchatów.

The county covers an area of 969.21 square kilometres (374.2 sq mi). As of 2006 its total population is 112,640, out of which the population of Bełchatów is 62,062, that of Zelów is 8,173, and the rural population is 42,405.

== Neighbouring counties ==
Bełchatów County is bordered by Pabianice County to the north, Piotrków County to the east, Radomsko County to the south, Pajęczno County to the south-west, Wieluń County to the west and Łask County to the north-west.

== Administrative divisions ==
The county is subdivided into eight gminas (one urban, one urban-rural and six rural). These are listed in the following table, in descending order of population.

Gmina	Type	Area (km^{2})	Population (2006)	Seat
Bełchatów	urban	34.6	62,062	
Gmina Zelów	urban-rural	168.2	15,321	Zelów
Gmina Bełchatów	rural	179.9	9,306	Bełchatów *
Gmina Szczerców	rural	128.9	7,582	Szczerców
Gmina Rusiec	rural	99.7	5,389	Rusiec
Gmina Drużbice	rural	114.5	4,873	Drużbice
Gmina Kleszczów	rural	124.8	4,158	Kleszczów
Gmina Kluki	rural	118.5	3,949	Kluki
* seat not part of the gmina
