= Śniadka =

Śniadka may refer to one of four villages in the administrative district of Gmina Bodzentyn, within Kielce County, Świętokrzyskie Voivodeship, in south-central Poland:

- Śniadka Druga
- Śniadka Parcele
- Śniadka Pierwsza
- Śniadka Trzecia
