= Hucisko, Gmina Bodzentyn =

Hucisko
- Village
- Location within Poland
- Coordinates: 50°57′35″N 20°52′30″E
- Country: Poland
- Voivodeship: Świętokrzyskie
- County: Kielce
- Gmina: Bodzentyn
- Population: 240

Hucisko [xuˈt͡ɕiskɔ] is a village in the administrative district of Gmina Bodzentyn, within Kielce County, Świętokrzyskie Voivodeship, in south-central Poland. It lies approximately 7 km (4 mi) west of Bodzentyn and 21 km (13 mi) north-east of the regional capital Kielce.
