= Kamieniec, Kielce County =

Kamieniec
- Village
- Location within Poland
- Coordinates: 50°57′43″N 20°53′43″E
- Country: Poland
- Voivodeship: Świętokrzyskie
- County: Kielce
- Gmina: Bodzentyn
- Population: 180

Kamieniec [kaˈmjɛɲɛt͡s] is a village in the administrative district of Gmina Bodzentyn, within Kielce County, Świętokrzyskie Voivodeship, in south-central Poland. It lies approximately 5 km (3 mi) north-west of Bodzentyn and 22 km (14 mi) north-east of the regional capital Kielce.
