= Psary-Stara Wieś =

- Village
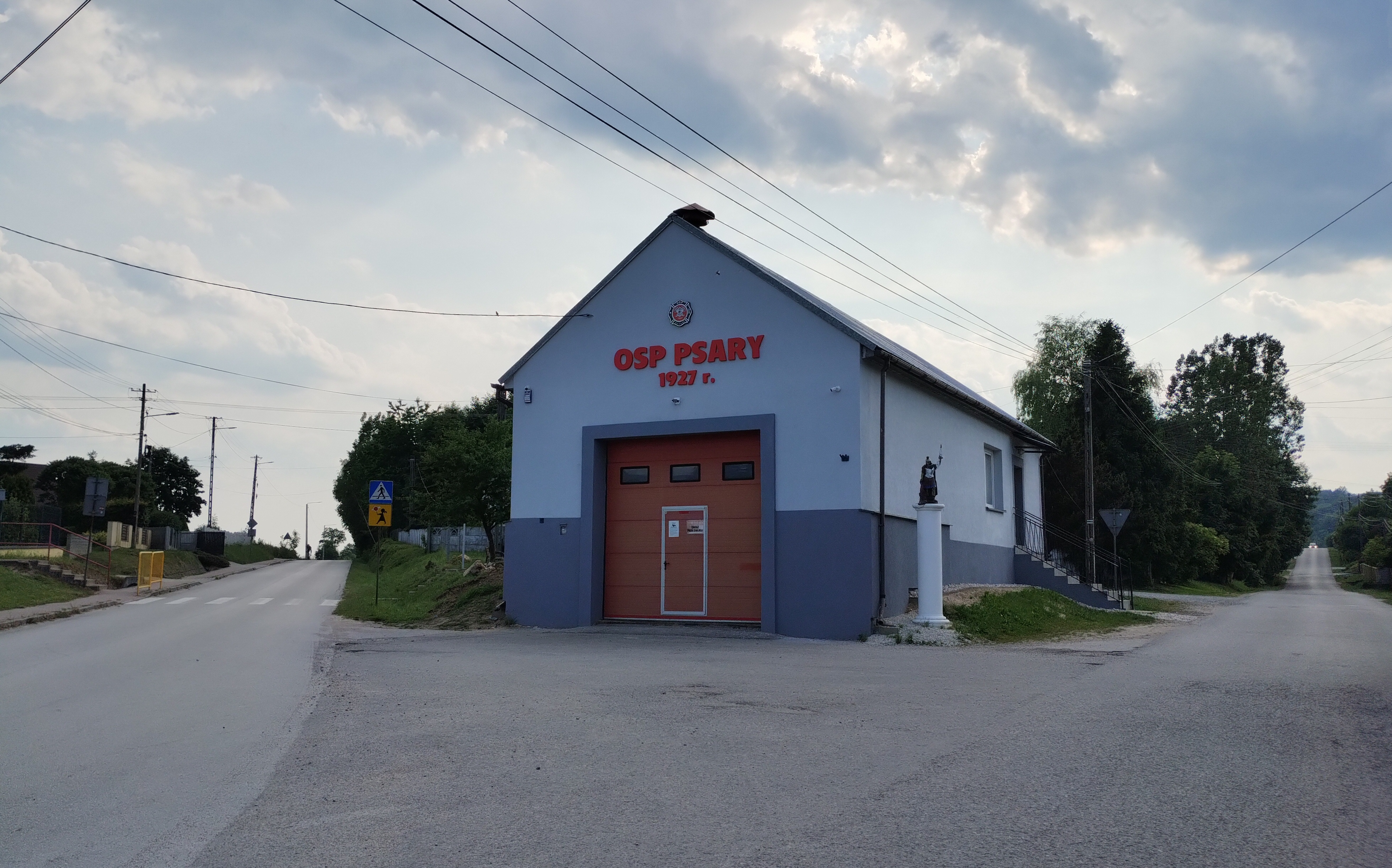
- Fire station

- Location within Poland
- Coordinates: 50°56′32″N 20°54′50″E
- Country: Poland
- Voivodeship: Świętokrzyskie
- County: Kielce
- Gmina: Bodzentyn
- Population: 500

Psary-Stara Wieś [ˈpsarɨ ˈstara ˈvjɛɕ] is a village in the administrative district of Gmina Bodzentyn, within Kielce County, Świętokrzyskie Voivodeship, in south-central Poland. It lies approximately 4 km (2 mi) west of Bodzentyn and 22 km (14 mi) east of the regional capital Kielce.
