= Podgórze, Kielce County =

Podgórze
- Village
- Location within Poland
- Coordinates: 50°55′57″N 20°56′27″E
- Country: Poland
- Voivodeship: Świętokrzyskie
- County: Kielce
- Gmina: Bodzentyn
- Population: 220

Podgórze [pɔdˈɡuʐɛ] is a village in the administrative district of Gmina Bodzentyn, within Kielce County, Świętokrzyskie Voivodeship, in south-central Poland. It lies approximately 2 km (1 mi) south-west of Bodzentyn and 24 km (15 mi) east of the regional capital Kielce.
