= Celiny, Gmina Bodzentyn =

Celiny
- Village
- Location within Poland
- Coordinates: 50°55′16″N 20°56′54″E
- Country: Poland
- Voivodeship: Świętokrzyskie
- County: Kielce
- Gmina: Bodzentyn

Celiny [t͡sɛˈlinɨ] is a village in the administrative district of Gmina Bodzentyn, within Kielce County, Świętokrzyskie Voivodeship, in south-central Poland. It lies approximately 3 km (2 mi) south of Bodzentyn and 24 km (15 mi) east of the regional capital Kielce.

== History ==
During World War II, on 4 May 1943, German soldiers under the command of Lieutenant Albert Hugo Schuster surrounded Celiny and gathered its residents. They executed three young men; Stefan Putkowski (32 years old), Bolesław Wzorek (20), and Stanisław Nowocień (21). An hour later, they also killed Stanisława Domoradzka, a 42-year-old woman from Bodzentyn who was en route to Celiny.

In December 2018, the local Women's Agricultural Circle, known as "Celinianki," was established under the leadership of Teresa Bzymek, the village's head. The group engages in traditional crafts, organizes community events, and participates in regional cultural activities.

80 years later, to honour the memory of the Munich massacre victims, a commemorative monument was unveiled on 10 September 2023, marking the 80th anniversary of the massacre. The ceremony commenced with a Mass at the village's community center, followed by the unveiling of the monument by local officials and representatives from the Institute of National Remembrance. The event featured a performance by the Estradi Various ensemble, which performed wartime songs, and a lecture on wartime atrocities in the region by Paweł Żołądek from the IPN.
