= Sieradowice Pierwsze =

- Village
- Location within Poland
- Coordinates: 50°57′41″N 20°56′30″E
- Country: Poland
- Voivodeship: Świętokrzyskie
- County: Kielce
- Gmina: Bodzentyn

Sieradowice Pierwsze [ɕɛradɔˈvit͡sɛ ˈpjɛrfʂɛ] is a village in the administrative district of Gmina Bodzentyn, within Kielce County, Świętokrzyskie Voivodeship, in south-central Poland. It lies approximately 3 km (2 mi) north-west of Bodzentyn and 25 km (16 mi) east of the regional capital Kielce.
