= Wola Szczygiełkowa =

- Village
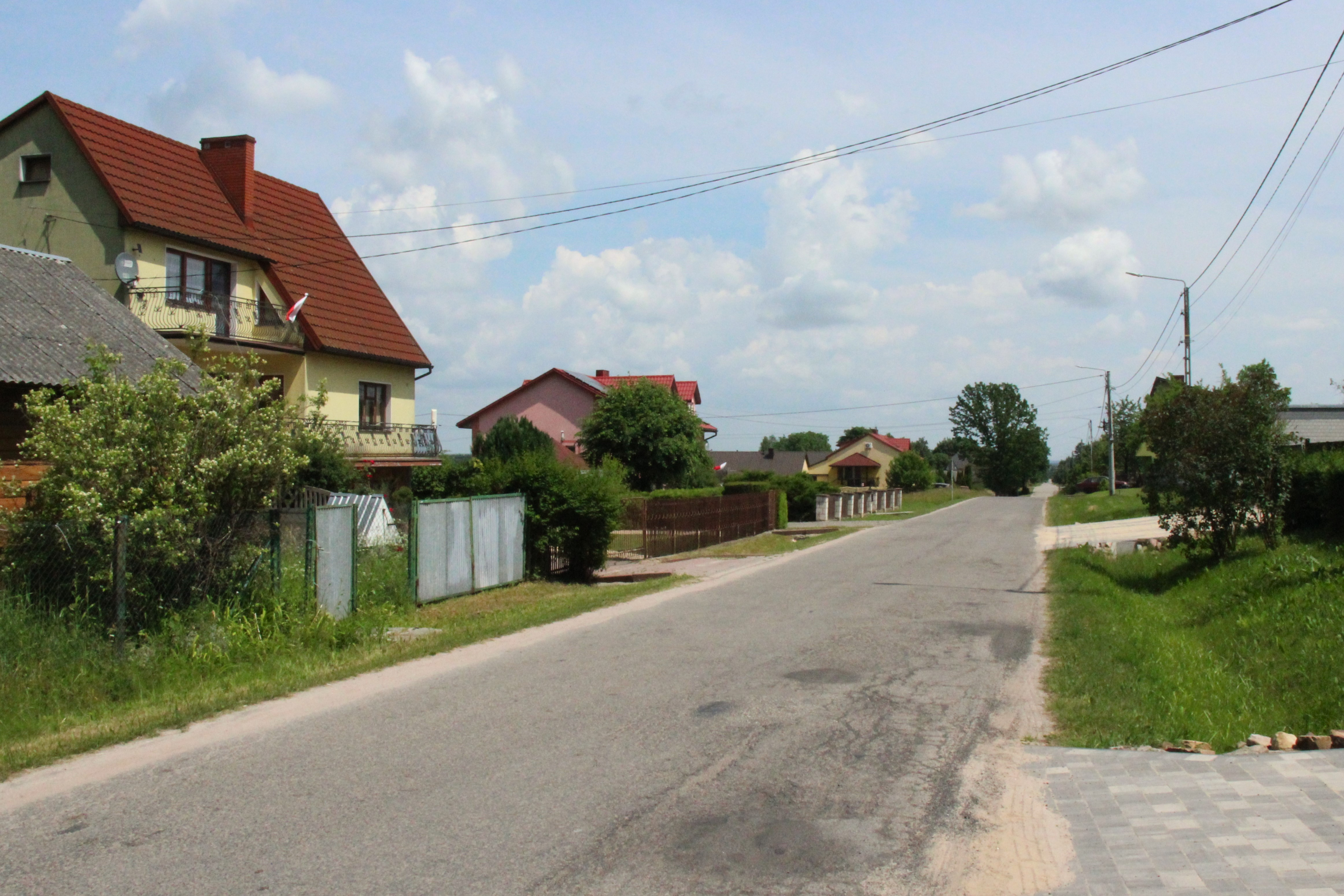

- Location within Poland
- Coordinates: 50°53′49″N 20°56′53″E
- Country: Poland
- Voivodeship: Świętokrzyskie
- County: Kielce
- Gmina: Bodzentyn
- Population: 610

Wola Szczygiełkowa [ˈvɔla ʂt͡ʂɨɡʲɛu̯ˈkɔva] is a village in the administrative district of Gmina Bodzentyn, within Kielce County, Świętokrzyskie Voivodeship, in south-central Poland. It lies approximately 5 km (3 mi) south of Bodzentyn and 24 km (15 mi) east of the regional capital Kielce.
