= Weather of 2007 =

Global weather activity of 2007 profiles the major worldwide weather events, including blizzards, ice storms, tornadoes, tropical cyclones, and other weather events from January 1, 2007 to December 31, 2007. Winter storms are events in which the dominant varieties of precipitation are formed during cold temperatures; they include snow or sleet, or a rainstorm where ground temperatures are cold enough to allow ice, including freezing rain, to form. They may be marked by strong wind, thunderstorms (thunder and lightning), heavy precipitation, including ice storm, wind transporting some substance through the atmosphere, including dust storms, snowstorms, and hail storms. Other major non winter events such as large dust storms, hurricanes, cyclones, tornados, gales, flooding, and rainstorms are also caused by such phenomena.

Very rarely, these weather events may form in summer, though it would have to be an abnormally cold summer, such as the summer of 1816 in the Northeast United States. In most locations in the Northern Hemisphere, the most powerful winter storms occur in March and in regions where temperatures are cold enough, as late as April.

== 2007 events ==
=== January ===
==== January 9–12 ====
Prior of hitting the Prairies, the system brought another windstorm to western British Columbia, with gusts exceeding 60 mph (97 km/h). Additional trees at Stanley Park in Vancouver were uprooted. It also hindered efforts from workers who were trying to repair the inflatable roof of BC Place Stadium (home to the Canadian Football League's BC Lions), which was damaged by winds from a previous storm a few days earlier. A secondary wave following the main storm dumped over 4 inches of snow (10 cm) in the Victoria, Vancouver, and Seattle areas with heavier snow in the mountains. Over 115,000 homes were without power during the storm in B.C.

The storm would later drop some locally heavy amount of snows in parts of northern Ontario and central Quebec with 8 inches (20 cm) reported in Saguenay.

==== January 12–24 ====
Following a prolonged period of mild weather, a series of winter storms produced several waves of damaging freezing rain across the Midwest of the United States and central Canada from the 12th to the 16th causing the deaths of 85 people as of January 20. Several thousands of customers from Texas to New England lost power, some for several days. Some areas received as much as 4 inches of ice (100 mm).

Oklahoma and Missouri were declared disaster areas as they were the most hard hit states from the storms. Areas from Utah to New Brunswick received heavy amounts of snow from the 13th to the 16th. The storm was followed by an intense period of cold across most of the continent from California to Newfoundland and Labrador.

Additional waves of precipitation have affected the south half of the United States from the 16th to 18th from Texas to North Carolina, while another winter storm, called a weather bomb affected portions of New Brunswick, Quebec and Maine on the 19th and 20th with near blizzard conditions. Portions of eastern Quebec received as much as 32 inches of snow (80 cm) in just over 12 hours

A total of 85 deaths across 12 U.S. states and three Canadian provinces, and caused hundreds of thousands of residents across the U.S. and Canada to lose electric power.

Winter storms contributed to deaths in traffic collisions: 14 in Missouri, 8 in Iowa, 12 in Texas, 2 in Minnesota, 4 in New York, 1 in Maine, 1 in Indiana, 4 in Michigan, 3 in Arkansas, 1 in Quebec, 1 in Ontario, 1 in Nova Scotia, 2 in North Carolina, 2 in Kansas, 4 in Nebraska and 25 in Oklahoma. A crash near Elk City, Oklahoma, killed 7 occupants who were inside a minivan when it collided with a tractor-trailer during the storm.

Another winter storm affected the central and southern Plains from the 19th to the 21st bringing snow and ice for most of the area with accumulations that topped off at about 4 to 10 inches of snow (10–25 cm). It also brought a light wintry mix across the Ohio Valley and the mid-Atlantic states on the 21st with little accumulation. Newfoundland and Labrador was the last region affected by the series of storms on the 23rd and 24th.

==== January 14 ====
Per was the name of a powerful storm with hurricane winds which hit the west coast of Sweden and Norway on the morning of January 14, 2007. In Sweden six people died from the storm and approx. 300,000 households were left without electricity.

==== January 15–19 ====
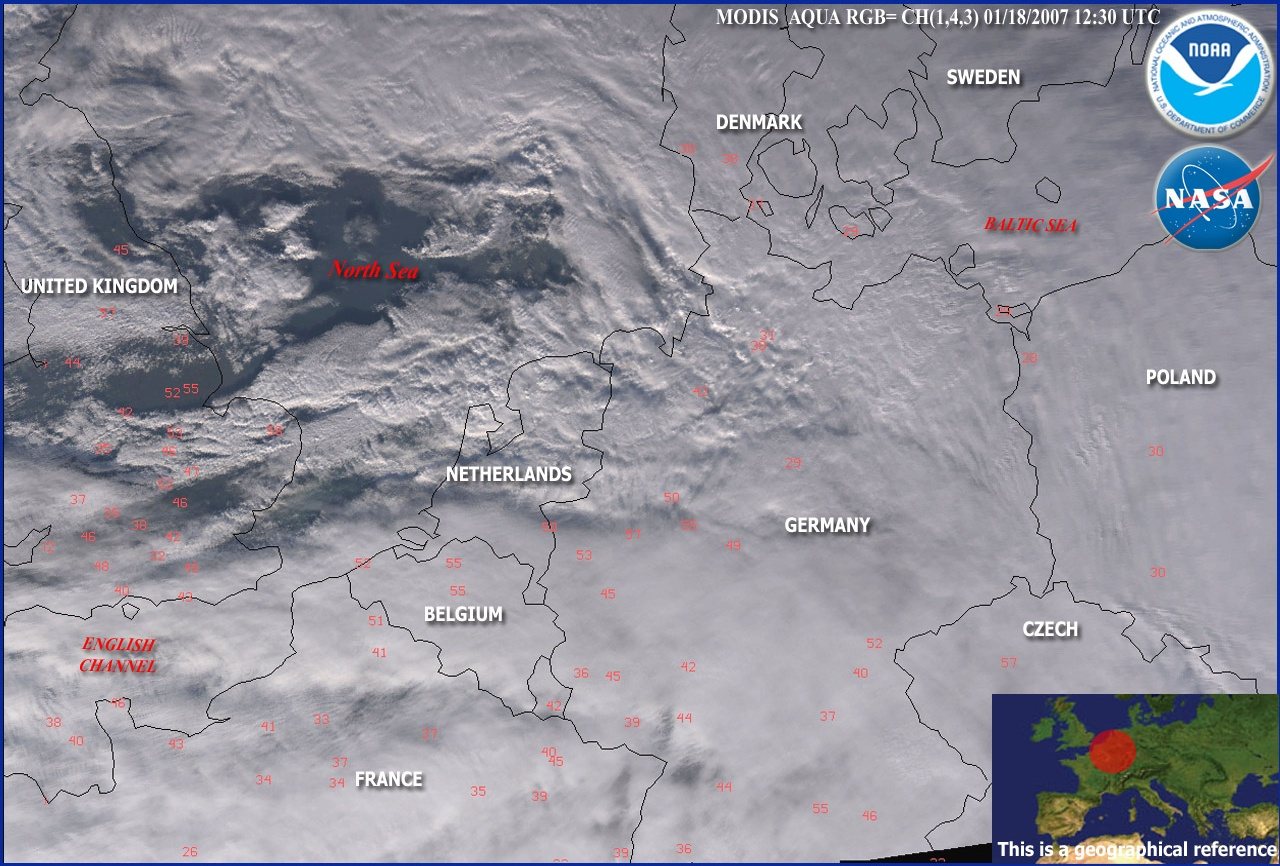
Kyrill as of January 18, 2007, at 12:30 UTC.

A major European windstorm gave heavy amounts of snow across portions of Scotland. Most areas of western Europe from Great Britain to the Czech Republic have experienced damaging winds. Wind gusts have reached 90 mph (140 km/h) in the plain and up to 140 mph (230 km/h) in the mountain area. Boat, rail and air traffic have been heavily affected, while several hundreds of flights from London, Berlin, Amsterdam, Vienna, Prague and Paris have been delayed or canceled. U.S. Secretary of State Condoleezza Rice shortened her European trip due to the strong winds. Millions of residents were without power including 1 million in the Czech Republic. As of 9:00 pm GMT on January 21, Kyrill had caused 47 fatalities. They were- 13 in Germany, 11 in United Kingdom, 7 in Ireland, 6 in The Netherlands, 4 in Poland, 3 in the Czech Republic 3, 1 in France, 1in Belgium and 1 in Austria.

Germany had 3 tornadoes on February 22.

==== January 23–27 ====
A snowstorm affected a large area of western and central Europe, including France, Great Britain, Austria and Germany bringing locally heavy snow accumulations and ice which disrupted air and train travel in Berlin, Stuttgart and London. Some areas in the Alps region received as much as 1 meter of snow (40 inches). Three people were killed in Germany due to accidents caused by the storm. Over 5,000 motorists were stranded in a highway in eastern France due to the heavy snow amounts. Scattered power outages were reported with central France being affected the most with nearly 85,000 homes without power.

On the 27th about 40,000 people had been affected by flooding in Bolivia and Peru

=== February ===
==== February 1–2 ====
A winter storm crossed through the southern United States, with a mix of winter weather. Several inches of snow fell across parts of Arkansas, Georgia, the Carolinas and Tennessee with scattered sleet and freezing rain farther south. Anywhere from 1–4 inches of snow fell across Tennessee and Arkansas, with lighter amounts in the Carolinas.

==== February 1–12 ====
Areas near Oswego and northeast of Syracuse received as much as 141 inches (360 cm) of snow during that period.

On February 1, a snow squall just east of Oshawa, Ontario on the north shore of Lake Ontario caused a 15-vehicle pileup including a tractor trailer which burst into flames. Two people were killed in the event. There were no reported deaths related to the event in New York State. However, 20 were killed in other states due to cold weather.

==== February 7–9 ====
A winter storm blanketed parts of the United Kingdom including the City of London disrupting travel all across the city including numerous flights cancelled from all airports and several motorists were stranding on area roads. Service on the Underground subway system was also affected with several stations been closed. Many schools were also closed for one or two days.

==== February 12–16 ====
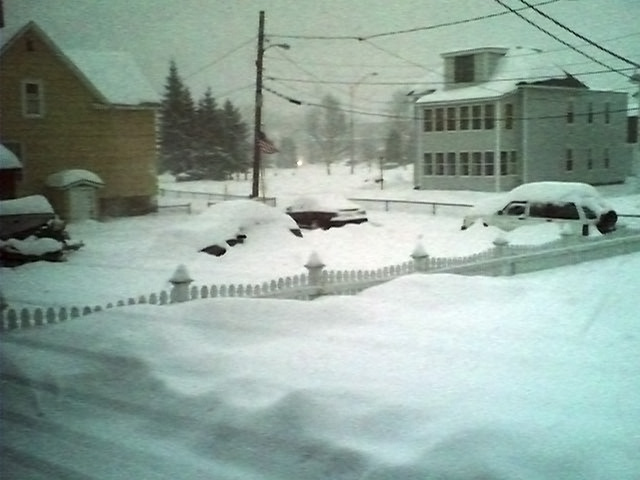
Snow cover in Berlin, New Hampshire

A major winter storm affected a large area of eastern North America from Nebraska to the Canadian Maritimes. Numerous areas received snow accumulations of over 6 inches (15 cm) with isolated reports as much as 1 meter (3.3 feet) in the Adirondacks and the Vermont mountains. Burlington, Vermont set a 24-hour snowfall record, with 25.3 inches. Twelve to sixteen inches (30 to 41 cm) of snowfall and blizzard conditions in central Illinois cancelled classes at the University of Illinois at Urbana–Champaign for two days, the first time classes had been cancelled since 1979.

Large cities including Cleveland, Hamilton, Syracuse, Rochester, Burlington, Quebec City and Sherbrooke received amounts well in excess of 1 foot of snow (30 cm). The city of Hamilton received local snowsqualls bombarding in from Lake Ontario with a north-east wind which dumped over 2 feet of snow (75 cm) in some parts of the city.

==== February 19–24 ====
A blizzard event took place across eastern Canada on the island of Newfoundland, dumping over 16 inches (41 cm) of snow in St. John's, the capital of Newfoundland and Labrador, shutting down most of the city, and closing all area schools. Heavy amounts were reported in the western Avalon Peninsula of the province. The storm previously affected portions of Nova Scotia and dumped locally heavy amounts of snow due to sea effects coming from the Atlantic Ocean and the Bay of Fundy. A new storm on the 23rd and 24th dumped an additional 6 inches (15 cm)in the capital with freezing rain, while heavier amount fell just to the west.

==== February 21–26 ====
Radar image of February 24, 2007 storm system at its peak (3 MB)

A storm moved onto the northern California coast early on the 21st, leading to 1–3 feet (30–91 cm) of snow across the southern Cascades, Siskiyous, Sierra Nevada, and the mountains of southern California. It also gave moderate snowfall accumulations across the Canadian Prairies between 4 and 8 inches (10 and 20 centimetres) across Manitoba.

Snowfall amounts from 12 to 24 inches (30 to 61 centimetres) were common in Minnesota, Iowa, Wisconsin, and Illinois, while lighter amounts were reported in Michigan and Ontario. Winona, Minnesota recorded the highest official snowfall total in this region, with 29.5 inches (75 cm) as well as La Crosse, Wisconsin with 21 inches (53 cm). Up to 1.5 inches (38 mm) of ice accumulation was reported from Iowa eastward into northern Indiana. Sustained winds of 30–40 mph (48–64 km/h) resulted in severe blowing and drifting in some of these locations. 10 people were killed in traffic accidents during the storm including 8 in Wisconsin, one in Ontario and one in Kansas.

The storm also brought severe thunderstorms and tornadoes from Kansas to Alabama, hitting Arkansas especially hard, where Dumas was heavily damaged by a tornado.

==== February 22–23 ====
A snowstorm moved across Scandinavia in northern Europe dumping heavy amounts of snow. The storm was blamed for one fatality in Denmark, while hundreds of flights from Copenhagen and Sweden were cancelled. Numerous motorists were stranded due to drifts that reached locally 3-meters high. A sports hall in Thisted, Denmark also collapsed but the building was vacant.

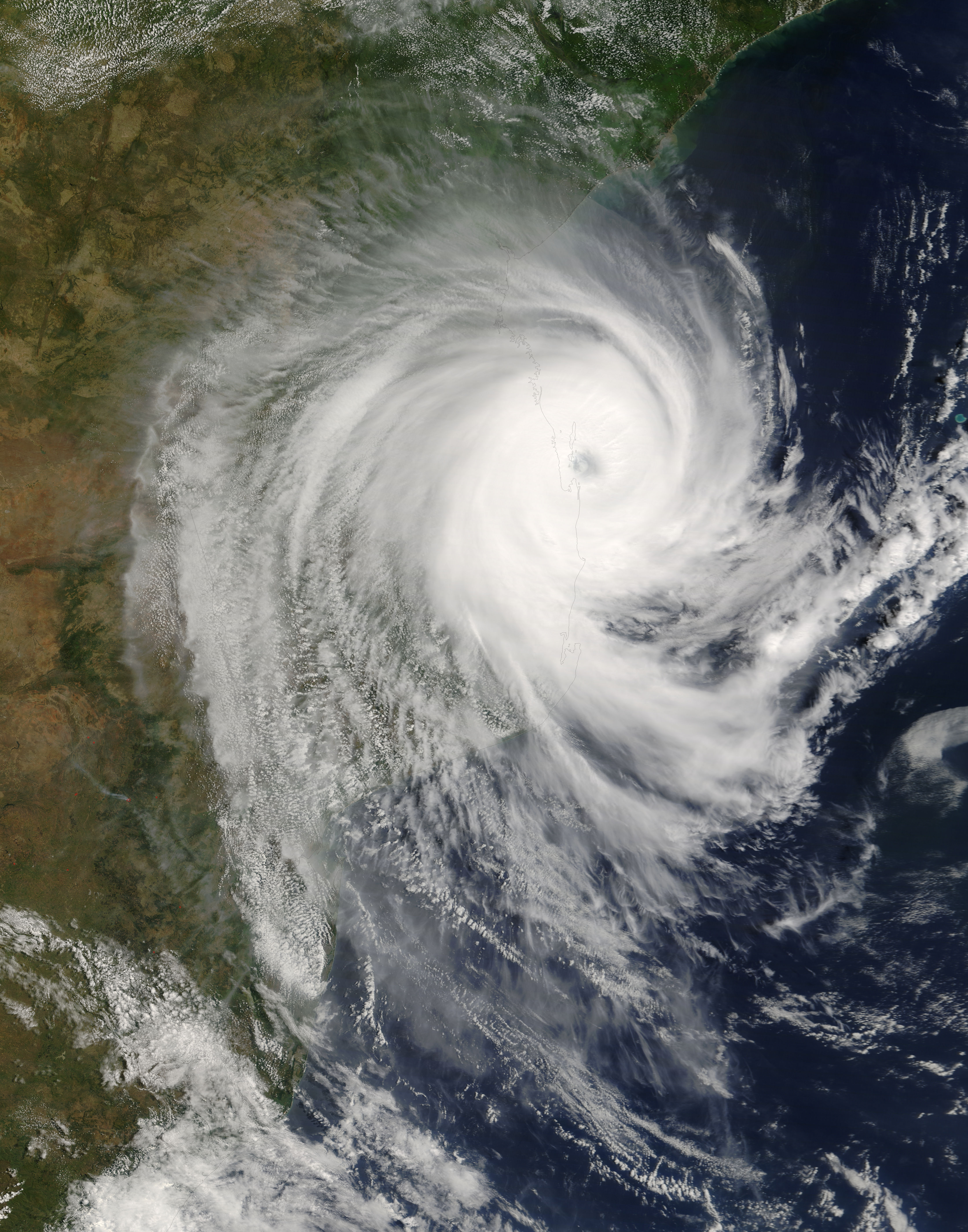
Category 4 Cyclone Favio made landfall on February 22, 2007.

The 2007 Mozambican flood began in late December 2006 when the Cahora Bassa Dam overflowed from heavy rains on Southern Africa. It worsened in February 2007 when the Zambezi River broke its banks, flooding the surrounding areas in Mozambique. The Chire and Rivubue rivers have also flooded.

==== February 27 – March 2 ====
Several areas in Manitoba as well as the Northern Plains received over 8 inches (20 cm) of snow with portions of Wisconsin receiving 16 inches (41 cm), 17 inches (43 cm) for parts of Iowa, 12–25 inches (30–64 centimetres) in parts of Minnesota with the highest accumulations falling in the northwest suburbs of the twin cities metropolitan region, (Anoka, Champlin, Maple Grove, Plymouth, Rogers)., and up to 21 inches (53 cm) across the Dakotas. Portions of Ontario and Quebec from Sault Ste. Marie to Montreal (including Sudbury, North Bay and Ottawa) received between 6 and 10 inches of snow (15–25 cm) on March 2. 80,000 customers lost power in the province with localized heavy amount across the Appalachians. Although Toronto did not receive large amounts of snow around 10 cm (3.9 in), hours of freezing rain that followed created a hazardoussituation the next day when the temperature rose in the city core and under the CN Tower causing massive chunks of ice sheets to cascade off the buildings hundreds of metres below, breaking some vehicle windows in a hotel parking lot. It forced City police to close the Gardiner Expressway on March 5.

The storm with the tornadoes and snow was blamed for 39 deaths including 10 in Alabama, 1 in Missouri, 9 in Georgia, two in Manitoba, two in Ontario, one in Minnesota, three in Michigan, one in Nebraska, four in North Dakota, one in Massachusetts and four in Wisconsin.

=== April ===
==== April 2–7 ====
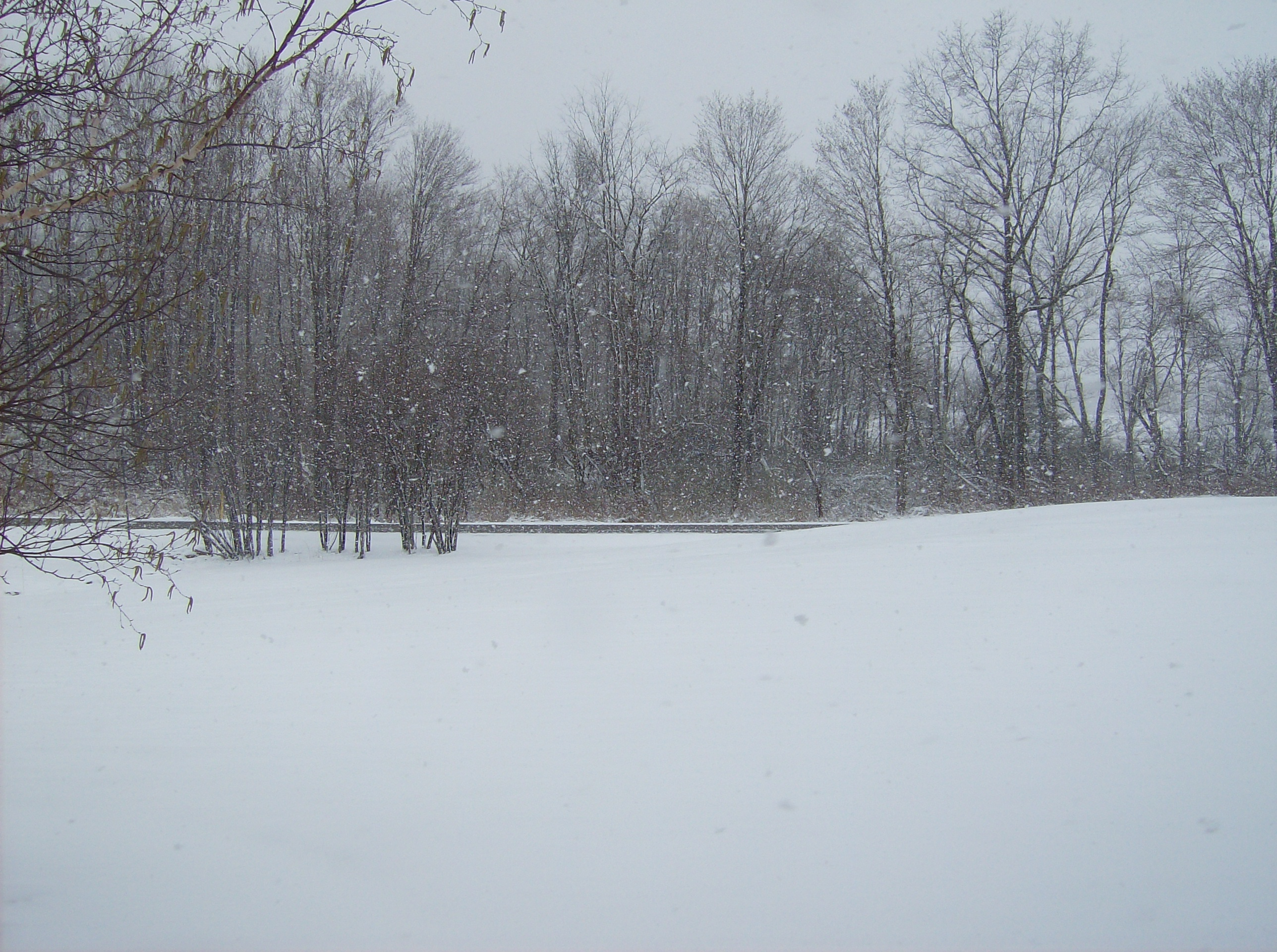
Parts of Pennsylvania, including countryside around Volant, received much snow on Good Friday and the following days.

A late season winter storm dumped a large swath of snow from North and South Dakota, eastward through Minnesota, Wisconsin and into Upper Michigan. Up to 9 inches (23 cm) of snow fell near Bismarck, North Dakota, 11 inches (28 cm) in Brainerd, Minnesota, and areas near Hurley, Wisconsin received 18 inches (46 cm). Parts of Upper and northern Michigan then saw a major Lake Effect event over approximately five days. Painesdale, Michigan received 65 inches (170 cm) of snow and the National Weather Service in Marquette received 47 inches (120 cm), shattering most previous April snowfall records for that city. Lake effect also affected the Lake Erie region, cancelling the series between the Cleveland Indians and Seattle Mariners baseball teams in Cleveland, and prompting a move of the next series with the Los Angeles Angels of Anaheim from Jacobs Field to Miller Park in Milwaukee.

In northern New England, the storm hit on April 4, 2007, a Wednesday afternoon, leaving behind up to a foot and a half (45 cm) of snow, sleet, and freezing rain. Over 180,000 homes lost power, mostly due to broken tree limbs snapping wires. The storm caused at least one death.

Heavy snow also fell across much of southern and central Quebec, with amounts in excess of 12 inches (30 cm) across some areas, with higher amounts over higher terrain in the Charlevoix region. Numerous accidents were reported across the provinces including one involving a firetruck. Two people were killed in accidents across the province.

==== April 8 ====
Another winter storm affected portions of New Brunswick, Nova Scotia, Quebec and Prince Edward Island on Easter Sunday dumping as much as 12 inches (30 cm) of snow locally along with strong winds which caused flight cancellations at Halifax International Airport and scattered power outages, mainly in Nova Scotia.

==== April 9–13 ====
For the second time in a week, the Northern Plains of the United States was affected by a late-season April winter storm. Snowfall totals of 8 inches (20 cm) were reported in Fairmont, Minnesota, while 9 inches (23 cm) was recorded in Victory, Wisconsin. 6 people died in snowfall related traffic accidents near Green Bay, Wisconsin. 5.1 inches (13 cm) fell in Muskegon, Michigan, on April 11, setting a snowfall record for that date.

Heavy mixed precipitations fell across portions of the Canadian Maritimes and southern Quebec with accumulations that exceeded 8 inches (20 cm) across the Eastern Townships and the Beauce region. The storm did shut down some schools across Nova Scotia on April 13, 2007.

==== April 13–16 ====
A major nor'easter struck the eastern half of North America bringing heavy rains, floods, storm surges and damaging wind across coastal areas. New York City itself received nearly 8 inches (200 mm) of rain in one day, making it one of the rainiest days ever for the city. Flooding did occur across many suburbs of the region as well as in other areas of the East Coast from Maine to Virginia. In Cape Elizabeth, Maine, an 80 mph wind gust was recorded, along with 30-foot waves that battered the coast. In New York, the National Guard assisted the emergency procedures while Maine, West Virginia and New Jersey declared state of emergencies. Several tornadoes struck the Carolinas killing at least 1 in South Carolina. Additional tornadoes struck northern Texas on the 13th. Also Wildfires were reported in Georgia and Florida, caused by strong winds from Nor'easter.

In addition, heavy snow fell across portions of Colorado, Kansas, New Mexico and Oklahoma on the 13th, bringing about 12 to 18 inches (30 to 46 centimetres) across the higher elevations. Then it dumped heavy snow across the Appalachian Mountains and the Laurentians of Quebec on the 15th and 16th. 17 inches (43 cm) fell over portions of Vermont, as much as 26 inches (66 cm) in Tupper Lake, New York and as much as 40 inches (100 cm) in the Charlevoix region of Quebec.

In Quebec as much as 160 000 Hydro-Québec customers lost power from the Outaouais to the Quebec City region while several schools were closed north of Montreal. An additional 17 000 households serviced by Hydro One and Hydro Ottawa suffered power outages in Eastern Ontario

Numerous flights were delayed or canceled from New York, Boston and Philadelphia as well as the Canadian airports of Montreal, Ottawa and Quebec City. In Boston, the annual Boston Marathon when ahead of schedule despite howling winds and pouring rain as well as cold temperatures.

Three people were killed in South Carolina, five in total in Texas and Kansas and five in Quebec.

==== April 23–24 ====
A strong low pressure system affected southern portions of the Rockies including the higher elevations of Colorado. Areas west of Denver received a much as 26 inches of snow (near Evergreen) with several other reports of 12 inches or more.

=== May ===
==== May 4–5 ====
While much of the Central Plains received heavy rain and damaging tornadoes, regions in higher elevations across the Rockies, including Colorado, Wyoming, Utah, Nebraska and Idaho, received snow, locally a major winter storm. Portions of central and northern Colorado received as much as 12 inches (30 cm) of snow during the overnight event.

==== May 9 ====
Also on May 9, a strong tornado struck Bebejia, Chad destroying the town and killing 14 people.

==== May 15–16 ====
Heavy rain storms hit Poland on May 15 and 16, causing heavy flooding in the south and east of the country. 8 inches of rain also fell in Gdańsk causing heavy localised flooding until the 17th.

On Sunday, May 16, the rivers in Lesser Poland had reached alarming leavels in 6 locations, a state of flood alert was issued in 23 places. Flood alerts were announced in the communities of Liszki, Skawina, Kraków, Rzezawa, Łapanów, Bochnia, Borzęcin, Gnojnik, Brest-Litovsk, Bobowa and Gorlice.

==== May 20–23 ====
Between May 20 and 23, emergency services evacuated the commune of Wilków along with some other parts of the Lublin area as the river Vistula broke its banks. Many people did not want to leave their homes and were forcibly removed for their own safety. The river Wisła fell by 12 cm of rain fell in Sandomierz, but the level of water grew alarmingly in Lublin, Liszki and Łódź. A person was killed in Lubin as he fell into an overflowing stream near their home.

May 22 saw Warsaw's opera hall, some schools, kindergartens and babies' nurseries closed in areas at risk of flooding. Local and state officials also asked for the expertise of German specialists who are experienced in carrying out the mass evacuation. Several hectares of land in the commune of Wilków was flooded by the Vistula River. Wrocław was partly flooded as the river Oder broke a dyke and the district Kozanów flooding an area of about 80 hectares.

=== June ===
==== June 3–4 ====
On June 3, a 3rd wave of flooding hit both Wilków, Liszki and Lubin as more powerful storms have passed over many places in the country and brought heavy rainfall. Most dykes and levees had been upgraded mostly held out in the Lublin area. The governor of Mazovia, Jacek Kozlowski, introduced a flood alert for all the municipalities and counties south of Mazovia.

Between June 3 and 4 dangerous levels of flooding returned to Lower Silesia. Local officials declared flood emergency in 16 counties and the city of Legnica The Polish Hydrological Service also confirmed that the river Oder would probably be involved in the second wave of climactic flooding.

==== June 7 ====
On June 7 the districts of Tarnów had closed the locks in the drainage ditches as flooding occurred several settlements in the municipality of Wierzchosławice. In the municipality Gromnik a series of landslides occurred, with some threateningly the high voltage poorer lines in Ryglice.

==== June 12 ====
On June 12, Polish Premier Donald Tusk visited a flooded village as the water began to subside.

==== June 11–13 ====
A major winter storm occurred in portions of Argentina and Chile creating hazardous traveling through several areas. Hardest hit areas were in the higher elevation along the Chile and Argentina borders. One of the main roads connecting the two counties was fully shut down while numerous trucks were left stranded in the area. The combination of heavy snow and hurricane-force winds force the shutdown of schools and businesses in Bariloche a popular resort destination in the country. Accumulations of several meters of snow fell in the Cristo Redentor Tunnel mountain pass.

==== June 20–21 ====
A winter storm affected portions of the southeastern coast of Australia and South Island, New Zealand. Heavy snows fell in the mountain regions of the Blue Mountains west of Sydney as well as Oberon and Bathurst while it disrupted air travel in Otago, New Zealand while causing numerous accidents across the area due to slippery conditions.

=== July ===
==== July 1–4 ====
A winter storm brushed the Antarctic Peninsula with hurricane-force winds in early July 2007. The San Martin Base weather station reported winds gusting up to 90 mph (140 km/h) on the evening of July 1, and winds up to 110 mph (180 km/h) by July 3. The strong winds caused temperatures to drop to −10 °F (−23 °C) and did not rise until July 4. Other weather stations in the Antarctic Peninsula reported similar effects.

==== July 9 ====
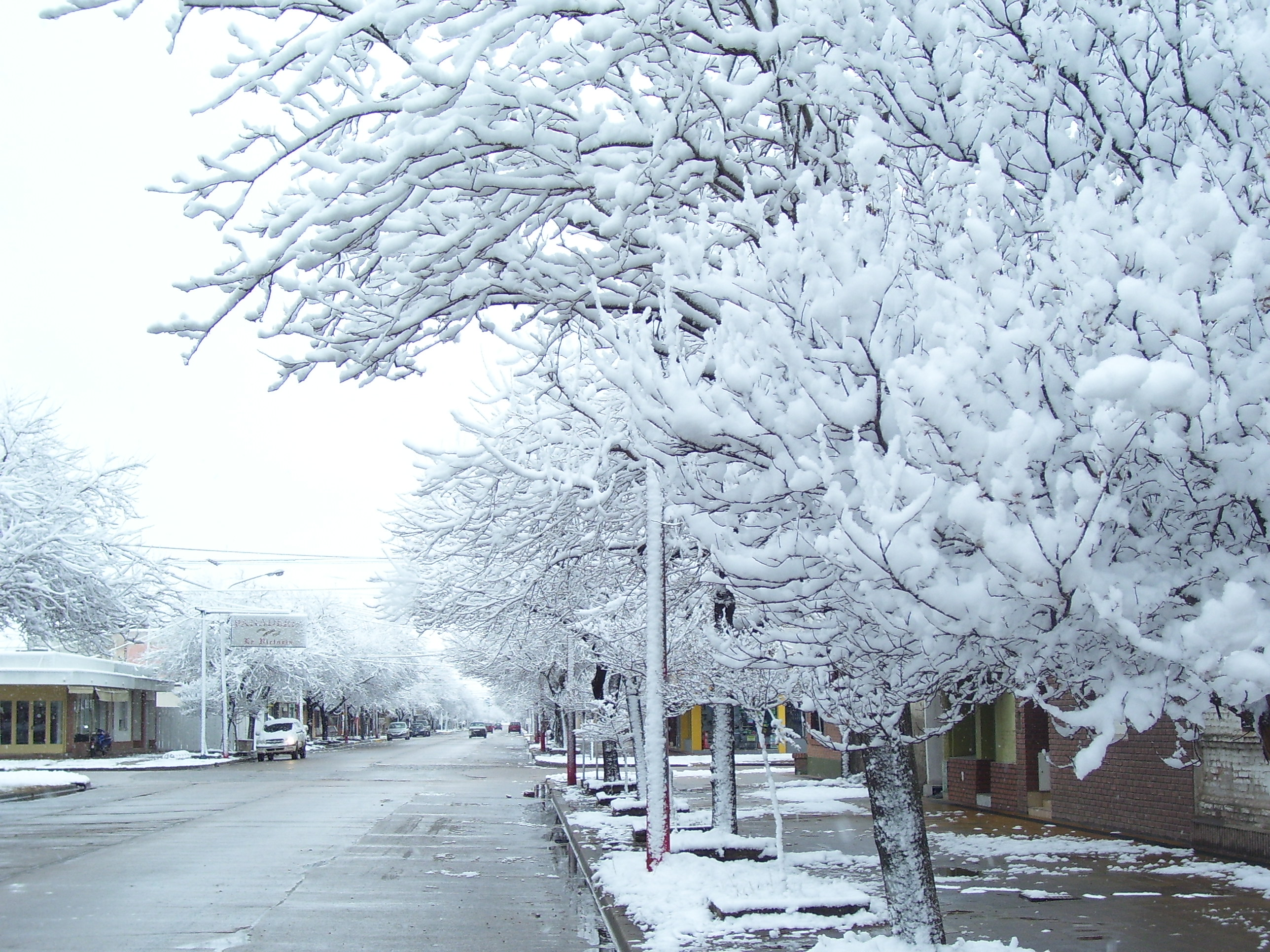
Frozen trees at La Carlota, Córdoba

An interaction with an area of low pressure systems across Argentina during the July 6, 7 and 8, 2007, and the entry of a massive polar cold snap made as a result the worst winter of Argentina in almost forty years, where severe snowfalls and blizzards affected the country The cold snap advanced from the south towards the central zone of the country during Friday, July 6, continuing its displacement towards the north during Saturday, July 7 and Sunday, July 8. On Monday July 9, the simultaneous presence of very cold air, above the average levels of the atmosphere as in the surface, gave place to the occurrence of snowfalls even in localities where snow is rare. This phenomenon left at least 23 people dead.

=== September ===
==== September 13–16 ====
2007 African floods
- Date: 3 days
- Location: Senegal Liberia Ghana Togo Burkina Faso Mali Niger Nigeria Chad Sudan Ethiopia Uganda Kenya Rwanda
- Deaths: 250

64 people were reported killed in the Sudan. 17 people were reported dead Ethiopia. In the Afar Region, the Awash River flooded caused a dam to collapse. Around 4,500 people were stranded, surrounded by water. 150,000 people were displaced in Uganda and 21 reported dead. 170 schools were under water. 18 people were reported dead and 500 residences were washed away by floods in Rwanda. Mali saw 5 bridges had collapsed and 250 residences were washed away. 33 people were reported dead in Burkina Faso, 12 people were reported dead in Kenya and Togo reported that 20 people were reported dead

=== November ===
==== November 1–5 ====
Hurricane Noel, which killed 163 people in the Caribbean Islands, affected most of Atlantic Canada, eastern Quebec and eastern New England as a post-tropical system with heavy rains and damaging winds in excess of 100 km/h (62 mph). The highest gust was recorded in the Wreckhouse area in Newfoundland and Labrador where gusts reached 180 km/h (110 mph). Nearly 200,000 customers in Atlantic Canada alone lost power during the height of the storm. In the northwesternmost edge of the system, Noel produced a narrow swath of snow (thus the first major winter storm across those areas) which affected areas of Maine, as well as Happy Valley – Goose Bay, Newfoundland and Labrador and eastern Quebec from near Rivière-du-Loup to Sept-Îles including Rimouski, Amqui, Cap Chat, Port-Cartier and portions of Baie-Comeau and Forestville. Some areas in Quebec received over 8 inches (20 cm) of snow with the Murdochville area receiving as much as 16 inches (41 cm). 14 people were injured when an Orleans Express bus overturned on Route 132 in the Saint-Simon area. Nearly 20,000 Hydro-Québec customers were without power mostly due to a damaged transmission line in the Minganie region. The storm prompted election director to extend the voting period for school board elections, which the storm disrupted.

==== November 5–7 ====
The first lake-effect snow event around the Great Lakes occurred as cold air swept through the region. The Upper Peninsula of Michigan saw up to a foot of snow, while up to 8 inches (20 cm) of snow fell in northern Pennsylvania. Significant snow also fell in western New York in the typical snowbelt regions. Areas on the southern shores of Lake Superior and Georgian Bay in Ontario also received significant amount of snows in excess of 6 inches (15 cm). The low pressure disturbance continued eastward to produce significant snowfalls across the mountains of central Quebec in excess of 12 inches (30 cm), disrupting traffic in several areas.

==== November 11–13 ====
A powerful storm in the Black Sea sank or damaged 5–10 ships, one of them, the oil tanker MT Volganeft-139, broke apart spilling most of its 1.3 million gallons of crude oil into the sea. The storm killed 3 crew members and the resulting oil spill killed over 30,000 birds and an unknown number of fish. Several merchant ships carrying over 6,000 tons of sulphur also sank: the M/S Nekhichevan and Kovel followed by M/S Volnogorsk when it collided with the sunken Kovel; a Georgian cargo carrying steel products also sank.

Further to the west in southeastern Europe, the storm dumped exceptional amounts of snow over parts of Austria with local reports of over a meter of snow. Some meteorologists mentioned that the weather that took place in the Alps was a once in every 30 to 50 year occurrence. The storm contributed to the closure of several mountain roads and an increased risk of avalanches over the region. The country's avalanche warning system raised its alarm level to the second-highest.

==== November 15–17 ====
A cold front pushed through eastern North America early on the 15th, bringing lake-effect snow to the typical snowbelt regions, dropping up to a foot of snow in the snow belts. The snow continued into the 17th, with snow developing across the northern Appalachians, central and eastern Quebec and northern Maine. Poor weather conditions were responsible for at least 2 deaths due to traffic accidents in Quebec on Route 175 south of Saguenay and on Highway 20 in Rimouski. Further east, significant rainfalls affected portions of the Gaspésie region with the towns of Matane, Cap-Chat and Sainte-Anne-des-Monts declaring disaster areas due to extensive flooding.

==== November 20–28 ====
A series of low pressure systems traveled across the central and eastern sections of North America, the Great Lakes and eastern Canada. While some of the systems dumped several inches of snow across portions of eastern Ontario and central Quebec on the 20th and 21st.

Several flights coming out of Toronto, Montreal, and Ottawa were affected. At one point during Ontario Provincial Police reported on average one motor-vehicle accident every minute. Activities surrounding the Canadian Football League's Grey Cup Match in Toronto had to be brought indoors or canceled due to the poor conditions. The storm is responsible for at least two death in Ontario including west of Renfrew on Highway 17 and on Highway 400 in Toronto. Sûreté du Québec reported well over a hundred vehicles running off the road only around Montreal and Montérégie, and a dozen more serious accidents in Mauricie. 20,000 Hydro-Québec were affected in total by power outages, with the most of them east of Montreal

During November 25 and 26, heavy rain and snow induced flooding devastates Serbia, especially the towns of Crni Marko and Novi Pazar

=== December ===
==== November 30 – December 2 ====
Preceding the large winter storm, a significant winter storm affected portions of the Canadian Maritimes and Newfoundland and Labrador on December 2. Initially a weak disturbance, it produced significant lake-effect snows across the traditional snow belts on the southern shores of Lakes Superior, Michigan, Huron and Ontario as well as Georgian Bay. The disturbance intensified over the Maritimes and dumped heavy amounts of snow across Prince Edward Island and Newfoundland and Labrador where accumulations of 8 to 20 inches (20 to 51 centimetres) were reported over central parts of the province. The storm registered a minimum of 957 mb off the Atlantic Coast two days later. Due to heavy snow, strong winds, sleet and freezing rain, over 100,000 customers in Newfoundland lost power, with a large portion of the capital St. John's being blacked out for several hours. In the Bonavista Peninsula, several transmission lines and support structures collapsed and telephone service was also disabled for a certain period including cellphone coverage. Some residents remained without power for over a week.

==== December 1–5 (eastern and central North America) ====
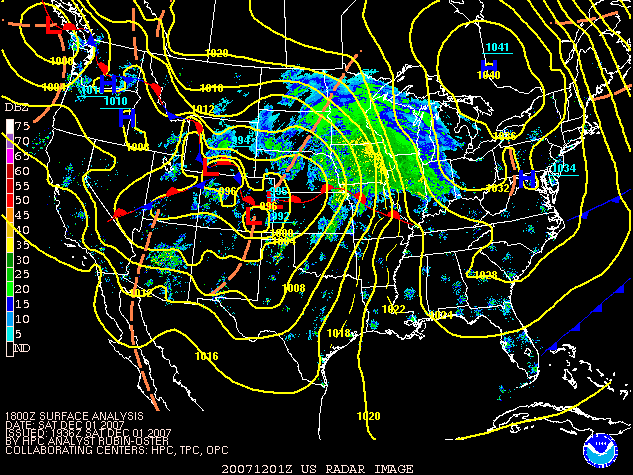
Radar shot of the stom on December 1 as the worst of the ice event was underway across the Midwestern United States. Courtesy of NWS Twin Cities, Minnesota

Areas of the Middle Plains and the lower Great Lakes including Des Moines, Chicago, Milwaukee, Detroit and Toronto received a significant wintry mix of precipitation before changing to rain and thunderstorms on December 1 and 2. Des Moines International Airport was shut down for several hours due to the icing conditions on runways and an American Airlines flight with 44 passengers slipped out of a taxiway while another skidded out of a runway at Madison, Wisconsin's Dane County Regional Airport. Numerous passengers were stranded for several hours at Chicago's O'Hare International Airport where 400 flights were canceled on December 1 alone. About 140,000 customers in Illinois alone lost power.

Portions of Wisconsin, Minnesota and northern Ontario received several inches of snow while the mountain regions of Colorado received as much as four feet of snow (120 cm), resulting in the postponement of the men's Super-G alpine skiing event in Beaver Creek, Colorado, where 15 inches (38 cm) was reported.

The storm was responsible for at least 16 deaths including three in Quebec, one in New York, one in Maine, one in Indiana, three in Wisconsin, two in Illinois, three in Michigan, one in Utah, and one in Colorado.

==== December 1–5 (Pacific Northwest to Middle-Atlantic) ====
Additionally, on December 1, a large storm off the Pacific Coast brought heavy snow to portions of British Columbia, including the South Coast and Vancouver Island, with amounts in higher elevations exceeding 16 inches (41 cm) and significant accumulations also for Metro Vancouver. Another large storm called a Pineapple Express brought torrential rains to the same areas on December 3 with very strong winds across portions of Oregon and Washington states, freezing rain into valley areas of central British Columbia, and heavy snow of up to 2 feet (0.61 m) across mountainous areas. The heavy rains caused a mudslide inside Stanley Park which closed its seawall which had just recently re-opened in November after it was heavily damaged during a major wind storm in December 2006. Extensive flooding was reported across many areas of Washington and Oregon after heavy rains with amounts of up to 10 inches (250 mm) were reported. Coast Guard helicopters had to evacuate and saved over 100 residents who were trapped by the high water levels. Snowmelt was also caused floods to Washington. The town of Vernonia, Oregon was completely cut off by the water and mudslides. Wind gusts locally exceeded 100 mph (160 km/h) with the highest gust registered at 129 mph (208 km/h) recorded in Bay City, Oregon. Over 100,000 customers from northern California to Washington lost electricity while 40,000 lost power in British Columbia. In addition, Amtrak service between Portland, Oregon and Vancouver, British Columbia was disrupted for at least two days.

The storm was responsible for at least 10 deaths, including five in a single vehicle crash near Prince George, British Columbia where there was snow-covered roads. Three people were killed in Washington and two in Oregon. From the perspective of Chicago, the storm was viewed as an Alberta clipper with the potential for heavy snowfall. During the evening of December 2, the storm was reported to have a central pressure of 949 mb, pressures associated with a Category 3 hurricane.

==== December 9–17 ====
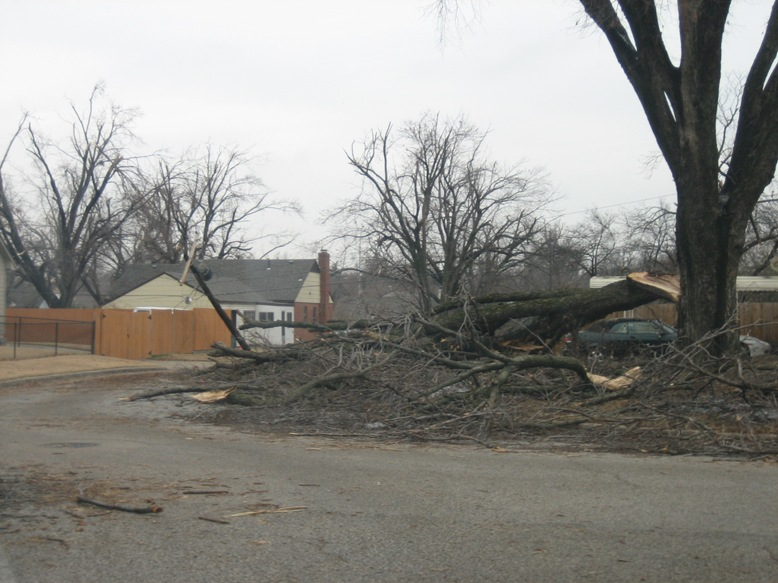
Extensive tree damage was common across most of Oklahoma, including the Tulsa region during the December 9–10 ice storm (Courtesy of NWS Tulsa, Oklahoma)

A series of winter storms impacted widespread areas of North America over a nine-day period. From December 8 to December 11, another major ice storm impacted the midsection of the United States from Texas, northeast through the Midwest, through the Mid-Atlantic States, and into southern New England. At least 38 people were killed by the ice storms, including 23 in Oklahoma, four in Kansas, three in Missouri, and one in Nebraska. Most of the fatalities were the result of traffic accidents caused by the icy weather, including four people in a single accident on Interstate 40 west of Okemah, Oklahoma. The storm caused the largest power outage in Oklahoma history, where 600,000 homes and businesses lost power, while 350,000 customers were also without power in other states, including 100,000 in both Missouri and Kansas, and scattered power outages in Nebraska, Iowa, and Illinois. Overall, over 1.5 million customers lost power throughout the Central United States with some being without electricity for over one week. The storms caused widespread school and flight cancellations with Chicago O'Hare International Airport cancelling at least 560 flights, while Tulsa International Airport was forced to halt flights on the 10th after losing power for 10 hours.

The energy of the second ice storm produced significant snows over the northeastern part of the US and the Golden Horseshoe region of Ontario on December 13 and dumped as much as 12 inches (30 cm) of snow in parts of New England and New York state.

==== December 18 ====
After a mild start to the cold season, a large area of Spain was hit by its first winter storm of the season which brought heavy snow and rain as well as strong winds and much colder temperatures. In the eastern part of the country, several roads were closed due to high amounts of snow. Portions of a key road link between Madrid and Barcelona was also shut down due to the weather.

==== December 21–24 ====
A new winter storm affected most of Central North America from the Texas Panhandle to northern Ontario while heavy rains, areas of freezing rain, very strong winds and warm temperatures affected most of Eastern North America. Blizzard warnings were issued at one point over southwestern Kansas and locally a foot of snow fell in some regions with several regions registering wind gusts of over 50 mph (80 km/h). Up to a foot of snow fell across much of Minnesota, Wisconsin, and Michigan, and freezing rain was also reported in many areas. Parts of Michigan's Upper Peninsula saw upwards of 15 inches (38 cm) of snow. The storm also produced strong winds, including wind gusts of 88 mph (142 km/h) across Lake Michigan, and gusts ranging from 50 to 68 mph across the Chicago area. The winds caused 300 flights to be canceled at Chicago-O'Hare International Airport. Also in Chicago, crews reported that 170 signals had been knocked out and more than 500 reports of fallen limbs had been attributed to the storm. 11,000 customers in Wisconsin, 92,000 in Michigan and 225,000 in Illinois lost power. The storm was responsible for at least 25 deaths across seven US states and one Canadian province, including eight in Minnesota, three in Indiana, three in Wyoming, five in Wisconsin, one in Texas, one in Kansas, one in Michigan, and three in New Brunswick. In Texas, the fatal crash included 50 vehicles on Interstate 40 while in Kansas and Missouri crashes on Interstate 70 and Interstate 29 respectively also involved several vehicles. Lake-effect snows across the traditional snowbelt region in the Great Lakes also fell on Christmas Eve.

== See also ==
- Winter storm
- Global storm activity of 2006
- Lake Storm "Aphid"
- November 2006 nor'easter
- Madden–Julian oscillation
- 2007 African floods

Global weather by year
Preceded by 2006	Weather of 2007	Succeeded by 2008
