= Psarka =

River in Poland

Location
- Country: Poland

Physical characteristics
- Mouth
  - location: Świślina
  - coordinates: 50°58′20″N 21°01′14″E

Basin features
- Progression: Świślina→ Kamienna→ Vistula→ Baltic Sea

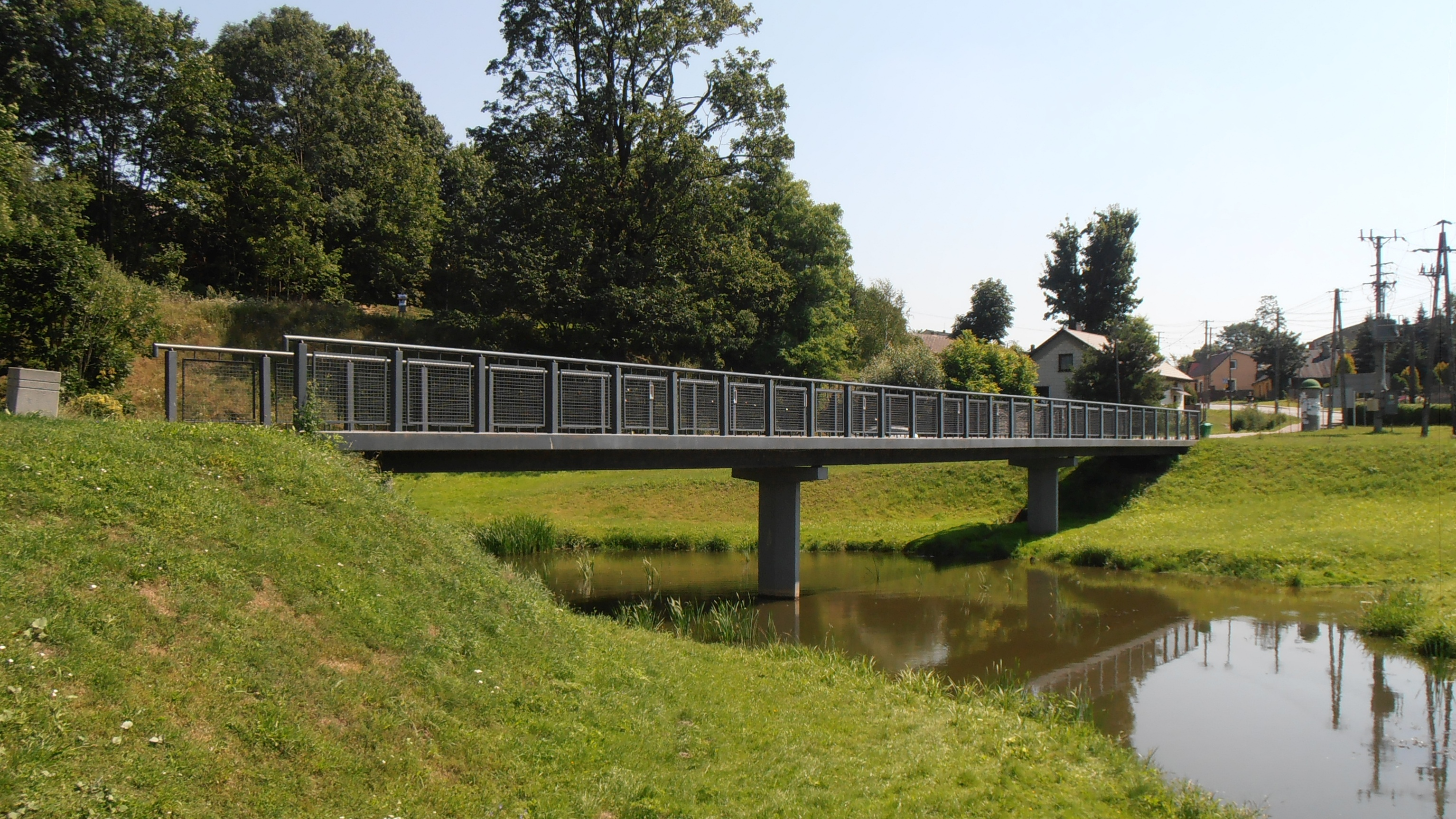
Bridge over the Psarka River in Bodzentyn, Poland

The Psarka is a river in the Świętokrzyskie Mountains of Świętokrzyskie Voivodeship, southern-central Poland. Its source is the northern foot of Bukowa Góra. It has a length of 20.5 kilometres and basin area of 89.5 square kilometres. It flows through the valley of Bodzentyńską, and later flows near the village of Radkowice-Kolonia and joins the Świślina, which is a right tributary of the Kamienna. Bodzentyn Castle stands above the river which also flows past Bodzentyn.
