= Kamienna Góra, Kielce County =

Kamienna Góra
- Village
- Location within Poland
- Coordinates: 50°58′16″N 20°55′59″E
- Country: Poland
- Voivodeship: Świętokrzyskie
- County: Kielce
- Gmina: Bodzentyn

Kamienna Góra [kaˈmjɛnna ˈɡura] is a village in the administrative district of Gmina Bodzentyn, within Kielce County, Świętokrzyskie Voivodeship, in south-central Poland. It lies approximately 4 km (2 mi) north-west of Bodzentyn and 25 km (16 mi) north-east of the regional capital Kielce.
