= Wzdół-Kolonia =

- Village
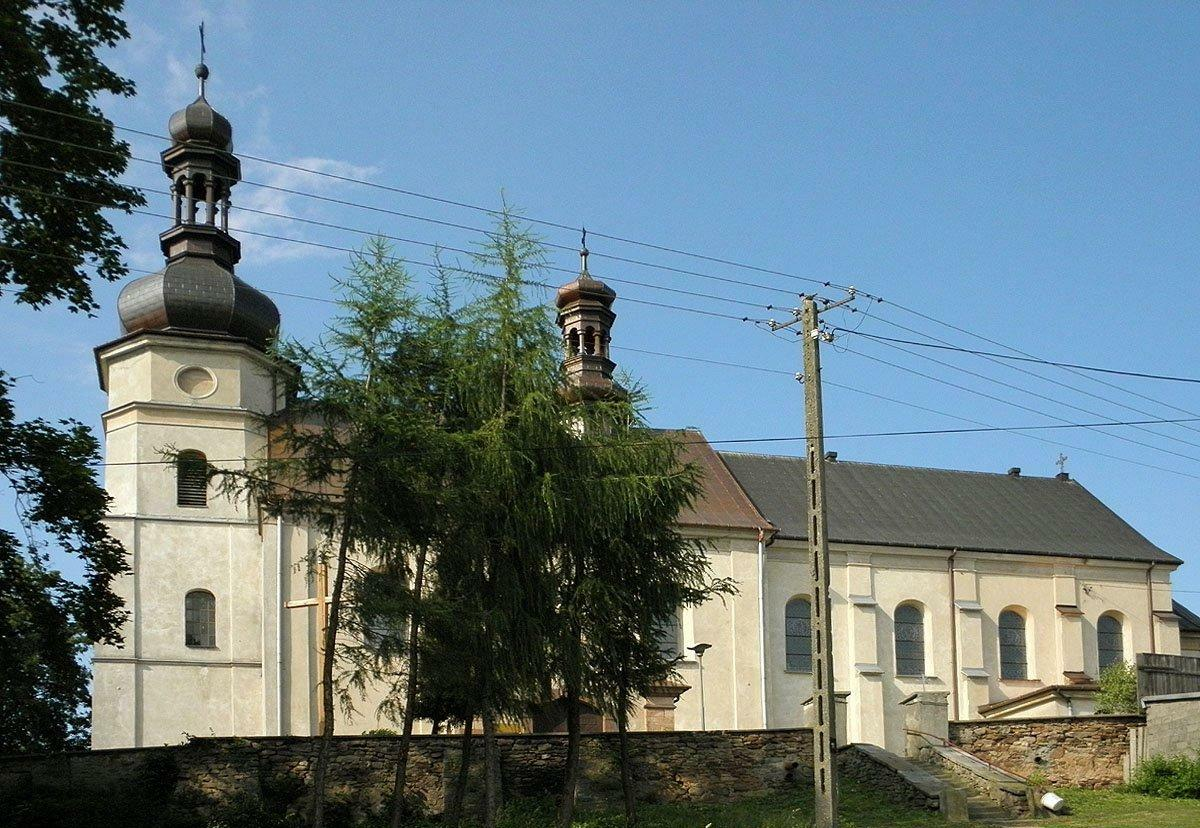
- Catholic church

- Location within Poland
- Coordinates: 50°58′24″N 20°53′2″E
- Country: Poland
- Voivodeship: Świętokrzyskie
- County: Kielce
- Gmina: Bodzentyn
- Population: 310

Wzdół-Kolonia [ˈvzduu̯ kɔˈlɔɲa] is a village in the administrative district of Gmina Bodzentyn, within Kielce County, Świętokrzyskie Voivodeship, in south-central Poland. It lies approximately 7 km (4 mi) north-west of Bodzentyn and 22 km (14 mi) north-east of the regional capital Kielce.
