= Dąbrowa Górna =

Dąbrowa Górna may refer to the following places in Poland:

- Dąbrowa Górna, Lower Silesian Voivodeship (south-west Poland)
- Dąbrowa Górna, Świętokrzyskie Voivodeship (south-central Poland)
