= Wiącka =

- Village
- Location within Poland
- Coordinates: 50°58′44″N 20°50′43″E
- Country: Poland
- Voivodeship: Świętokrzyskie
- County: Kielce
- Gmina: Bodzentyn
- Population: 460

Wiącka [ˈvjɔnt͡ska] is a village in the administrative district of Gmina Bodzentyn, within Kielce County, Świętokrzyskie Voivodeship, in south-central Poland. It lies approximately 9 km (6 mi) north-west of Bodzentyn and 20 km (12 mi) north-east of the regional capital Kielce.
