= Orzechówka =

Orzechówka may refer to the following places:

- Orzechówka, Podlaskie Voivodeship (north-east Poland)
- Orzechówka, Subcarpathian Voivodeship (south-east Poland)
- Orzechówka, Świętokrzyskie Voivodeship (south-central Poland)
