= Psary-Kąty =

- Village
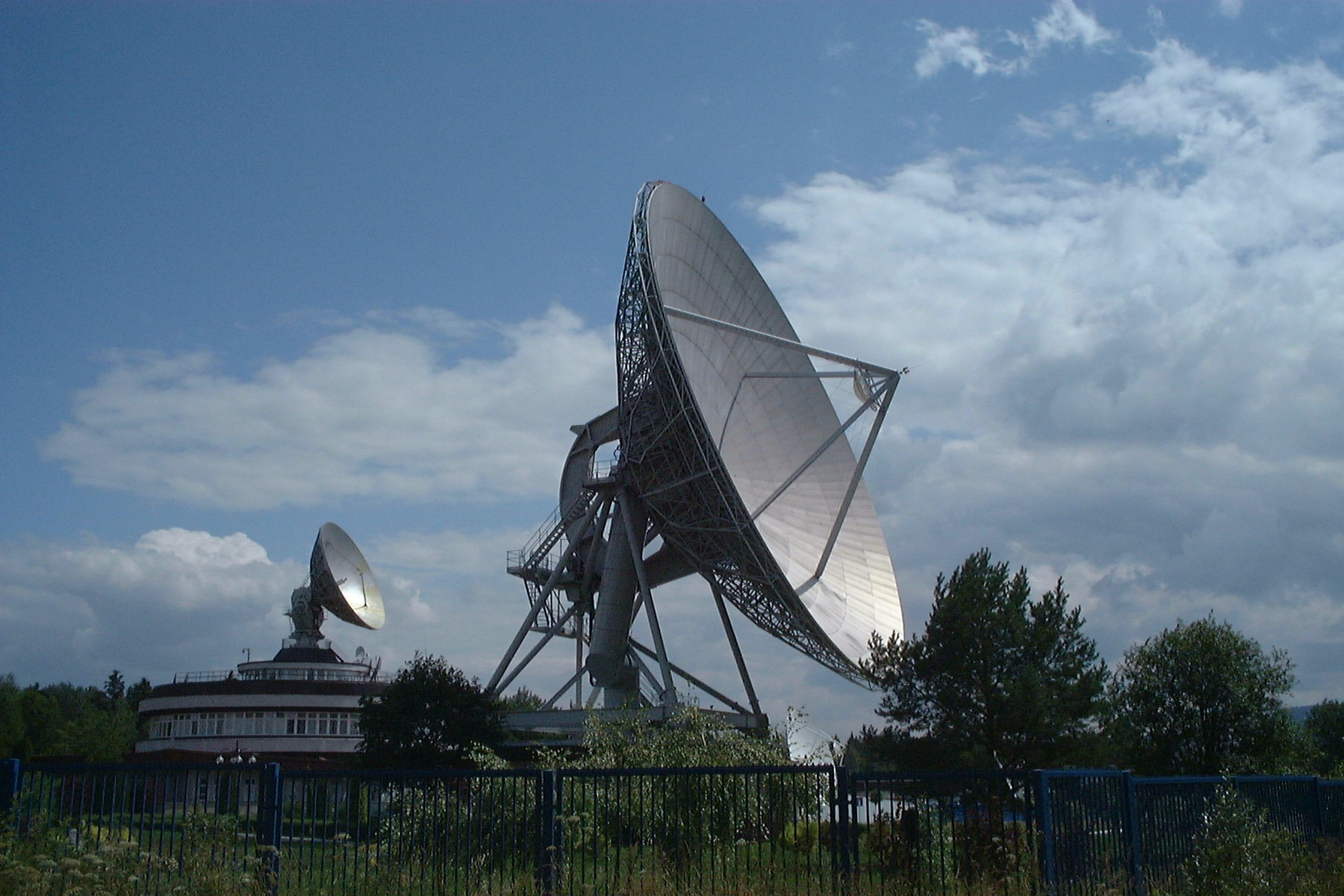

- Location within Poland
- Coordinates: 50°56′25″N 20°52′46″E
- Country: Poland
- Voivodeship: Świętokrzyskie
- County: Kielce
- Gmina: Bodzentyn
- Population: 510

Psary-Kąty [ˈpsarɨ ˈkɔntɨ] is a village in the administrative district of Gmina Bodzentyn, within Kielce County, Świętokrzyskie Voivodeship, in south-central Poland. It lies approximately 6 km (4 mi) west of Bodzentyn and 20 km (12 mi) east of the regional capital Kielce.

From 1974 at Psary-Kąty, there was a large satellite ground station (Centrum Usług Satelitarnych), operated by Telekomunikacja Polska, with up to seven large parabolic antennas. It was closed on 31 July 2010 due to decreasing interest in satellite voice transmission.
