= Święta Katarzyna, Świętokrzyskie Voivodeship =

Święta Katarzyna
- Village
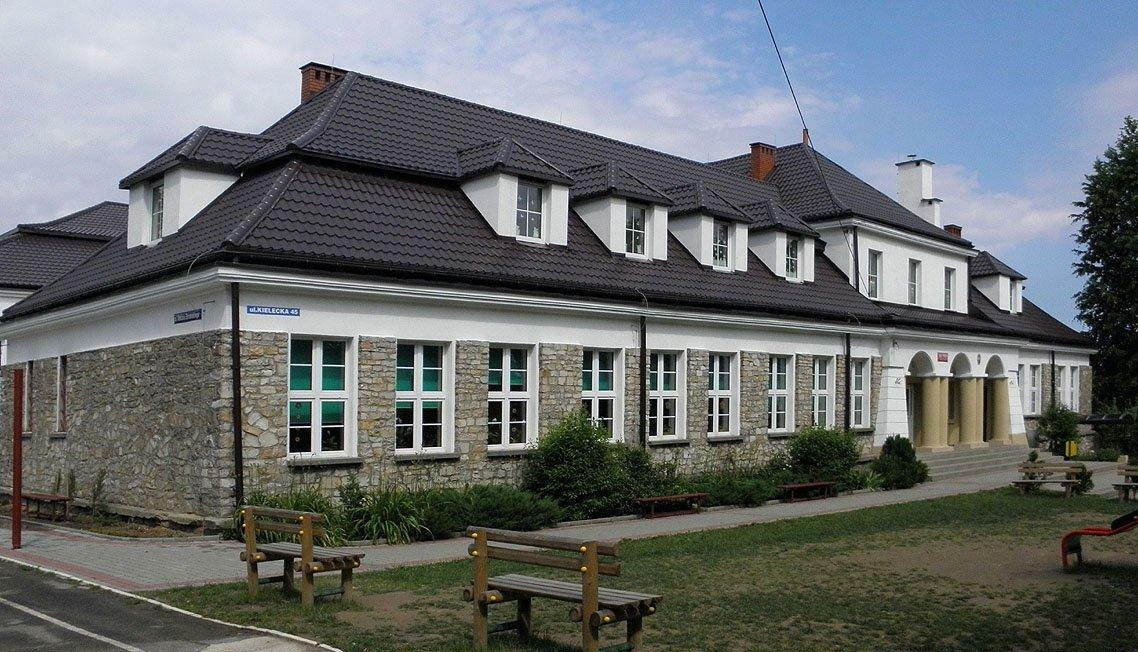
- School

- Location within Poland
- Coordinates: 50°54′22″N 20°52′50″E
- Country: Poland
- Voivodeship: Świętokrzyskie
- County: Kielce
- Gmina: Bodzentyn
- Population: 410

Święta Katarzyna (Polish pronunciation: [ˈɕfjɛnta kataˈʐɨna]; "Saint Catherine") is a village in the administrative district of Gmina Bodzentyn, within Kielce County, Świętokrzyskie Voivodeship, in south-central Poland. It lies approximately 7 km (4 mi) south-west of Bodzentyn and 19 km (12 mi) east of the regional capital Kielce.
