= Podmielowiec =

- Village
- Location within Poland
- Coordinates: 50°59′12″N 20°55′40″E
- Country: Poland
- Voivodeship: Świętokrzyskie
- County: Kielce
- Gmina: Bodzentyn
- Population: 280

Podmielowiec [pɔdmjɛˈlɔvjɛt͡s] is a village in the administrative district of Gmina Bodzentyn, within Kielce County, Świętokrzyskie Voivodeship, in south-central Poland. It lies approximately 6 km (4 mi) north-west of Bodzentyn and 25 km (16 mi) north-east of the regional capital Kielce.
