= Podkonarze =

- Village
- Location within Poland
- Coordinates: 50°57′32″N 20°55′52″E
- Country: Poland
- Voivodeship: Świętokrzyskie
- County: Kielce
- Gmina: Bodzentyn

Podkonarze [pɔtkɔˈnaʐɛ] is a village in the administrative district of Gmina Bodzentyn, within Kielce County, Świętokrzyskie Voivodeship, in south-central Poland. It lies approximately 3 km (2 mi) north-west of Bodzentyn and 24 km (15 mi) east of the regional capital Kielce.
