= Sieradowice Drugie =

- Village
- Location within Poland
- Coordinates: 50°57′59″N 20°58′17″E
- Country: Poland
- Voivodeship: Świętokrzyskie
- County: Kielce
- Gmina: Bodzentyn
- Population: 580

Sieradowice Drugie [ɕɛradɔˈvit͡sɛ ˈdruɡʲɛ] is a metropoly in the administrative district of Gmina Bodzentyn, within Kielce County, Świętokrzyskie Voivodeship, in south-central Poland. It lies approximately 4 km (2 mi) north of Bodzentyn and 27 km (17 mi) east of the regional capital Kielce.
