= Psary-Podłazy =

- Village
- Location within Poland
- Coordinates: 50°57′6″N 20°53′9″E
- Country: Poland
- Voivodeship: Świętokrzyskie
- County: Kielce
- Gmina: Bodzentyn
- Population: 220

Psary-Podłazy [ˈpsarɨ pɔdˈwazɨ] is a village in the administrative district of Gmina Bodzentyn, within Kielce County, Świętokrzyskie Voivodeship, in south-central Poland. It lies approximately 6 km (4 mi) west of Bodzentyn and 21 km (13 mi) east of the regional capital, Kielce.
