= Siekierno =

- Village
- Location within Poland
- Coordinates: 50°58′47″N 20°56′43″E
- Country: Poland
- Voivodeship: Świętokrzyskie
- County: Kielce
- Gmina: Bodzentyn
- Population: 390

Siekierno [ɕɛˈkʲɛrnɔ] is a village in the administrative district of Gmina Bodzentyn, within Kielce County, Świętokrzyskie Voivodeship, in south-central Poland. It lies approximately 5 km (3 mi) north of Bodzentyn and 26 km (16 mi) north-east of the regional capital Kielce.
