= Dąbrowa Dolna, Świętokrzyskie Voivodeship =

Dąbrowa Dolna
- Village
- Location within Poland
- Coordinates: 50°55′19″N 20°58′10″E
- Country: Poland
- Voivodeship: Świętokrzyskie
- County: Kielce
- Gmina: Bodzentyn

Dąbrowa Dolna [dɔmˈbrɔva ˈdɔlna] is a village in the administrative district of Gmina Bodzentyn, within Kielce County, Świętokrzyskie Voivodeship, in south-central Poland. It lies approximately 3 km (2 mi) south of Bodzentyn and 26 km (16 mi) east of the regional capital Kielce.
