= Śniadka Parcele =

- Village
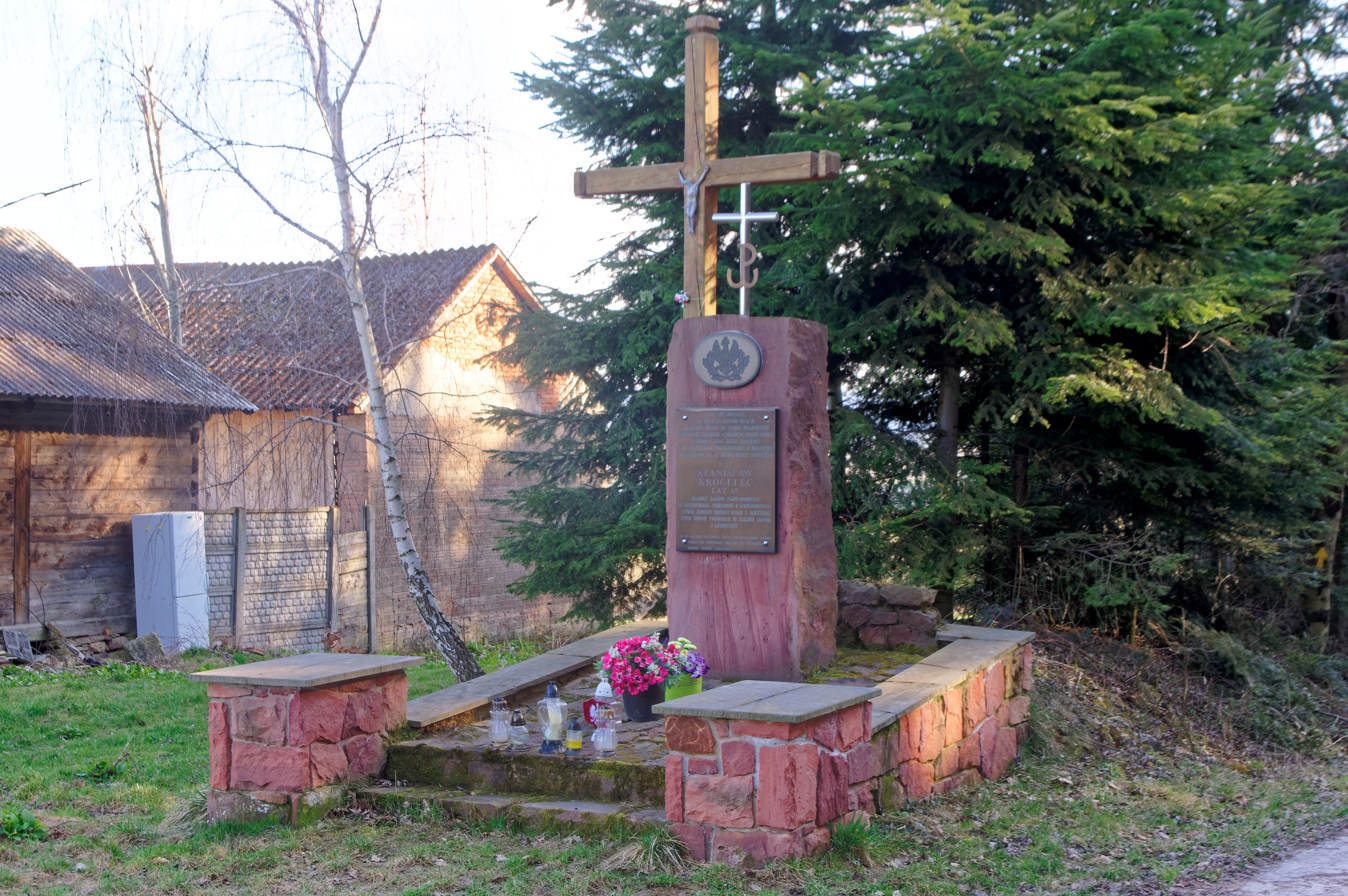
- Monument

- Location within Poland
- Coordinates: 50°58′30″N 20°59′11″E
- Country: Poland
- Voivodeship: Świętokrzyskie
- County: Kielce
- Gmina: Bodzentyn
- Population (2011): 138

Śniadka Parcele [ˈɕɲatka parˈt͡sɛlɛ] is a village in the administrative district of Gmina Bodzentyn, within Kielce County, Świętokrzyskie Voivodeship, in south-central Poland. It lies approximately 5 km (3 mi) north-east of Bodzentyn and 28 km (17 mi) east of the regional capital Kielce. Between 1975 and 1998, Śniadka Parcele was part of Kielce Voivodeship.

The blue tourist trail from Wąchock to Cedzyna passes through Śniadka Parcele.
