= Dąbrowa Górna, Świętokrzyskie Voivodeship =

Dąbrowa Górna
- Village
- Location within Poland
- Coordinates: 50°55′53″N 20°58′36″E
- Country: Poland
- Voivodeship: Świętokrzyskie
- County: Kielce
- Gmina: Bodzentyn

Dąbrowa Górna [dɔmˈbrɔva ˈɡurna] is a village in the administrative district of Gmina Bodzentyn, within Kielce County, Świętokrzyskie Voivodeship, in south-central Poland. It lies approximately 2 km (1 mi) south-east of Bodzentyn and 26 km (16 mi) east of the regional capital Kielce.
