= Śniadka Trzecia =

- Village
- Location within Poland
- Coordinates: 50°57′42″N 20°59′56″E
- Country: Poland
- Voivodeship: Świętokrzyskie
- County: Kielce
- Gmina: Bodzentyn

Śniadka Trzecia [ˈɕɲatka ˈtʂɛt͡ɕa] is a village in the administrative district of Gmina Bodzentyn, within Kielce County, Świętokrzyskie Voivodeship, in south-central Poland. It lies approximately 4 km (2 mi) north-east of Bodzentyn and 29 km (18 mi) east of the regional capital Kielce.
