= Orzechówka, Świętokrzyskie Voivodeship =

Orzechówka
- Village
- Location within Poland
- Coordinates: 50°59′31″N 20°52′49″E
- Country: Poland
- Voivodeship: Świętokrzyskie
- County: Kielce
- Gmina: Bodzentyn
- Population: 210

Orzechówka [ɔʐɛˈxufka] is a village in the administrative district of Gmina Bodzentyn, within Kielce County, Świętokrzyskie Voivodeship, in south-central Poland. It lies approximately 8 km (5 mi) north-west of Bodzentyn and 23 km (14 mi) north-east of the regional capital Kielce.
