= Bodzentyn Castle =

Ruined castle in Poland

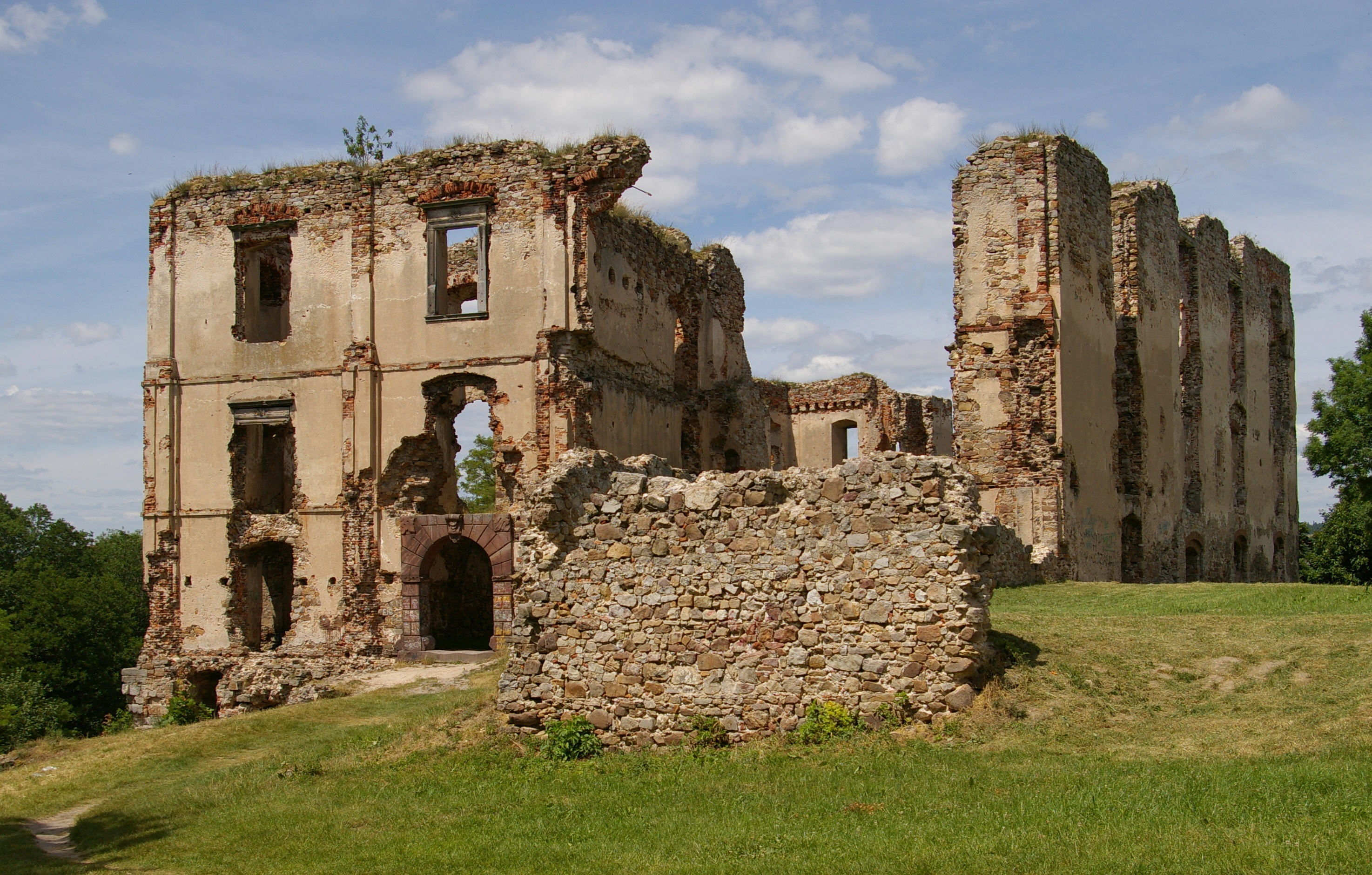
- Bodzentyn Castle ruins

- Location within Poland
- 50°56′31″N 20°57′5″E
- Location: Bodzentyn, Poland

Bodzentyn Castle (Polish: Zamek w Bodzentynie) is a ruined castle in Bodzentyn, Poland. It was built in the second half of the fourteenth century.

== History ==
At the beginning of the fourteenth century, the Bishop of Kraków, Bodzanta, built a wooden mansion on a hill above the Psarką river. This manor house was destroyed fairly quickly and the later Bishop of Kraków Florian Mokrski erected a stone castle on a hill, surrounded by a moat. One of the greatest events in the history of the castle took place in 1410 when King Wladyslaw Jagiello visited it on pilgrimage to the Holy Cross before the Battle of Grunwald.

The fifteenth and sixteenth centuries were a time of unprecedented prosperity of the castle. It was expanded after the great fire of 1413 and at the end of the fifteenth century, Cardinal Fryderyk Jagiellończyk added a new east wing with the residential towers. Construction work continued during the sixteenth century by successive bishops Jan Konarski, Piotr Tomicki, Franciszek Krasiński and Piotr Myszkowski, who gradually gave it all the features of the Renaissance style. All the activities were led by the Italian architect, Jan Balcer.

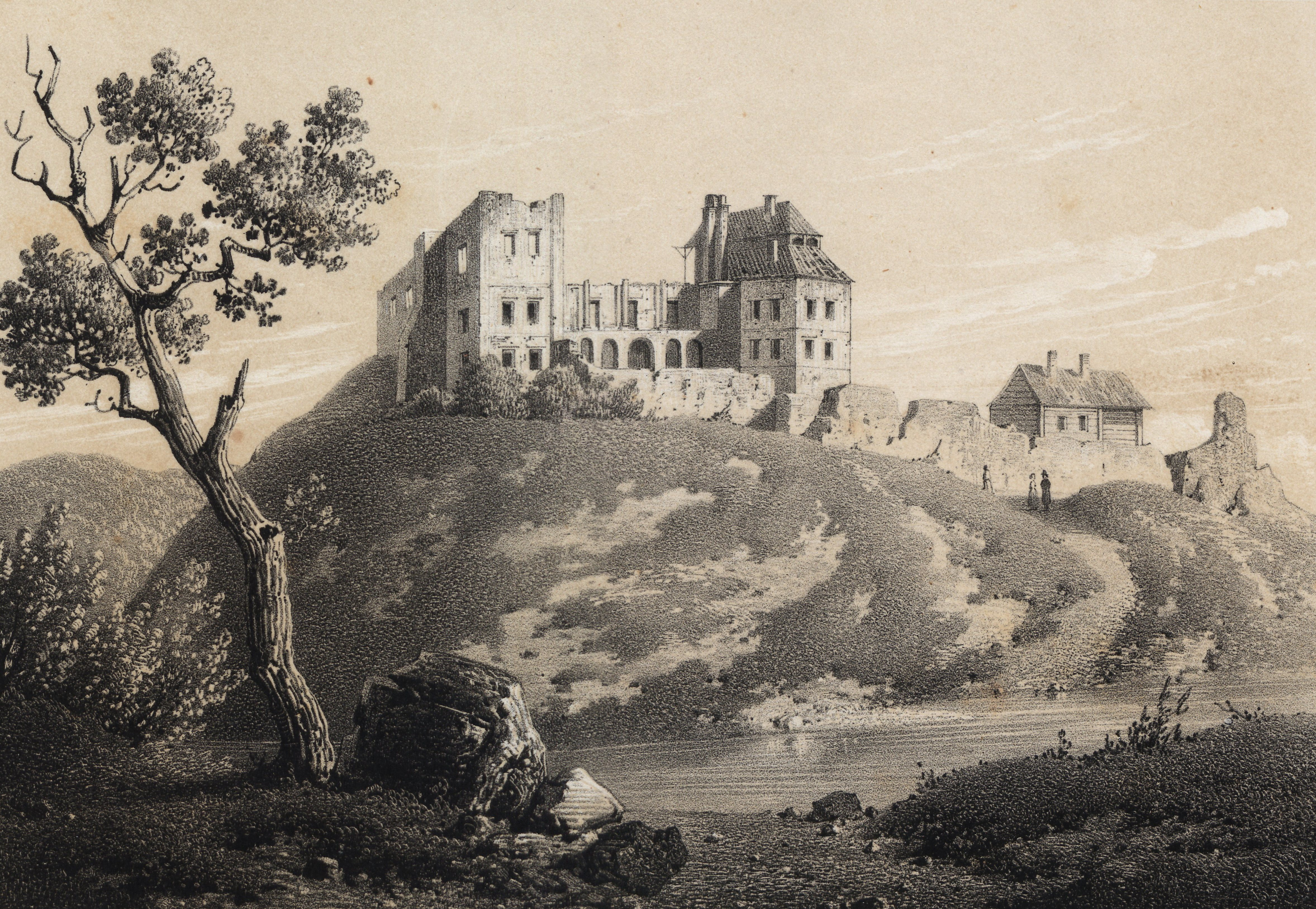
Bodzentyn Castle in the mid-19th century

Last significant reconstruction of the castle took place between 1657–1691, under the leadership of the bishops Jakub Zadzik, Piotr Gembicki, Piotr Tylicki, Marcin Szyszkowski, Andrzej Trzebicki and Jan Małachowski. The building took the form of the Baroque, with a horseshoe-shaped plan. The last investor in the residence was in the 2nd half of the eighteenth century by Bishop Cajetan Sołtyk, employing eminent architect, Jakub Fontana.

The importance of the castle in Bodzentyn began to decline following the construction of the episcopal palace in Kielce. In 1789, the Diet decided to proceed to nationalize episcopal property. The castle was converted into a granary and a military hospital. In 1814 the building was finally omitted. The medieval castle became mainly a source of free building materials for the local population, consequently to erode the monument into ruin. Only in 1902 did the building become protected. But it was never rebuilt to its former glory.

== See also ==
- Castles in Poland
