= Wilków, Świętokrzyskie Voivodeship =

Wilków
- Village
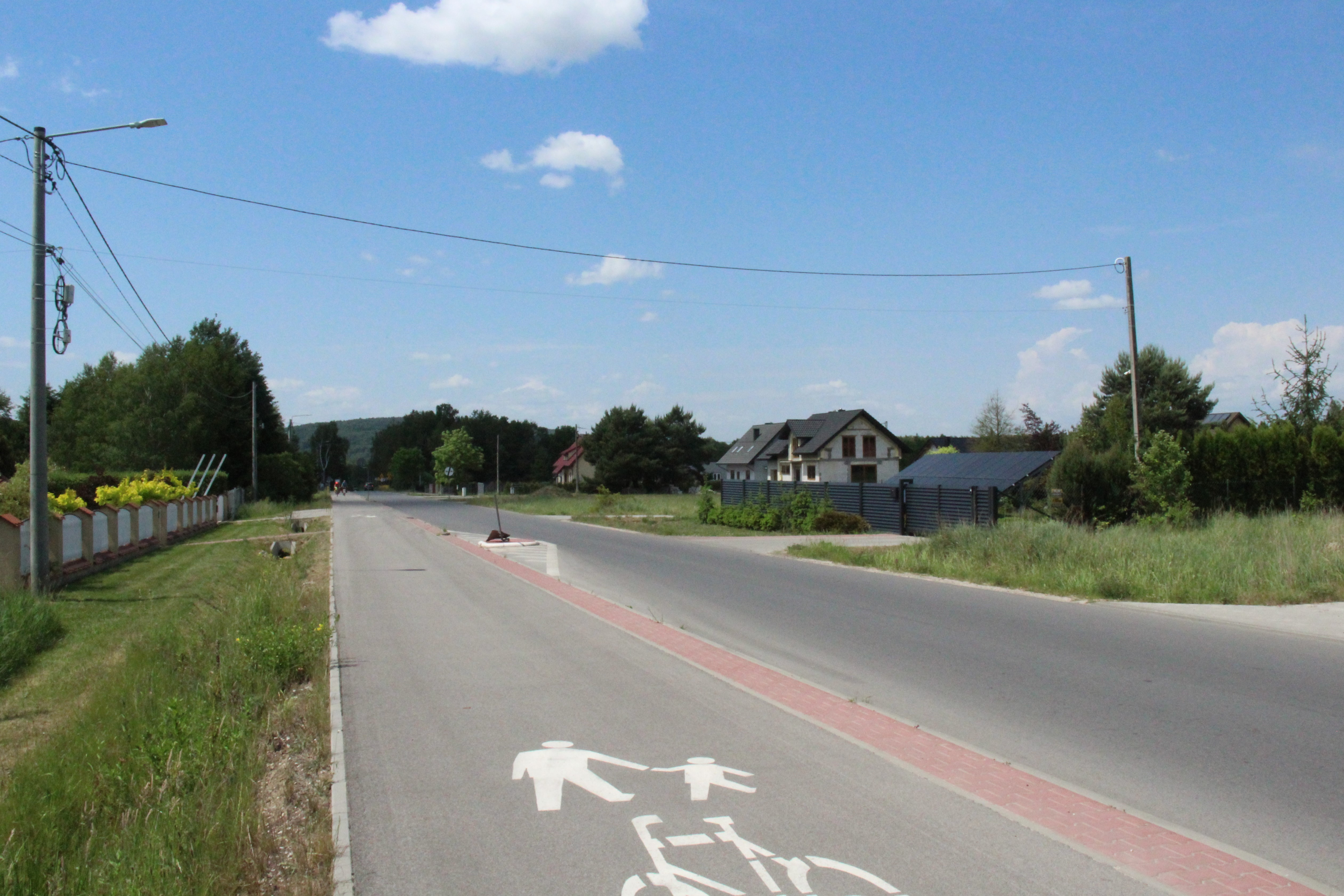

- Location within Poland
- Coordinates: 50°54′45″N 20°50′48″E
- Country: Poland
- Voivodeship: Świętokrzyskie
- County: Kielce
- Gmina: Bodzentyn
- Population: 790

Wilków [ˈvilkuf] is a village in the administrative district of Gmina Bodzentyn, within Kielce County, Świętokrzyskie Voivodeship, in south-central Poland. It lies approximately 9 km (6 mi) west of Bodzentyn and 17 km (11 mi) east of the regional capital Kielce.
