= Śniadka Pierwsza =

- Village
- Location within Poland
- Coordinates: 50°57′25″N 20°58′49″E
- Country: Poland
- Voivodeship: Świętokrzyskie
- County: Kielce
- Gmina: Bodzentyn

Śniadka Pierwsza [ˈɕɲatka ˈpjɛrfʂa] is a village in the administrative district of Gmina Bodzentyn, within Kielce County, Świętokrzyskie Voivodeship, in south-central Poland. It lies approximately 3 km (2 mi) north-east of Bodzentyn and 27 km (17 mi) east of the regional capital Kielce.
