= 2007 African floods =

2007 flooding in 14 countries in Africa

Meteorological history
- Duration: September 2007

Overall effects
- Fatalities: 250
- Areas affected: Senegal; Liberia; Ghana; Togo; Burkina Faso; Mali; Niger; Nigeria; Chad; Sudan; Ethiopia; Uganda; Kenya; Rwanda

The 2007 floods of Africa was reported by the UN to be one of the worst flooding events in recorded history. The flooding started with rains on September 14, 2007 local time. Over 14 countries had been affected in the continent of Africa, 250 people were reported to have been killed and 1.5 million were otherwise impacted. The UN had issued warnings of water borne diseases and locust infestations.

== Regional impact ==
=== Ghana ===
As many as 400,000 were homeless with at least 20 people dead. Crops and livestock were washed away, with some communities completely destroyed.

=== Sudan ===
Sixty-four people were reported killed.

=== Ethiopia ===
Seventeen people were reported dead. In the Afar Region, the Awash River flooded caused a dam to collapse. Around 4,500 people were stranded, surrounded by water.

=== Uganda ===
As many as 150,000 people were displaced and 21 reported dead. There were 170 schools under water.

=== Rwanda ===
Eighteen people were reported dead and 500 residences were washed away by floods.

=== Mali ===
Five bridges had collapsed and 250 residences were washed away.

=== Burkina Faso ===
Thirty-three people were reported dead.

=== Kenya ===
Twelve people were reported dead.

=== Togo ===
Twenty people were reported dead.

== See also ==
- 2009 West Africa floods
- Global storm activity of 2007
- Water scarcity in Africa
