= Gmina Bodzentyn =

Gmina Bodzentyn Bodzentyn Commune
- Gmina
- Coat of arms
- Interactive map of Gmina Bodzentyn
- Coordinates (Bodzentyn): 50°56′27″N 20°57′28″E
- Country: Poland
- Voivodeship: Świętokrzyskie
- County: Kielce County
- Seat: Bodzentyn

Area
  - Total: 160.32 km^{2} (61.90 sq mi)

Population (2006)
  - Total: 11,677
  - Density: 72.836/km^{2} (188.64/sq mi)
  - Urban: 2,241
  - Rural: 9,436
- Website: http://www.bodzentyn.pl/

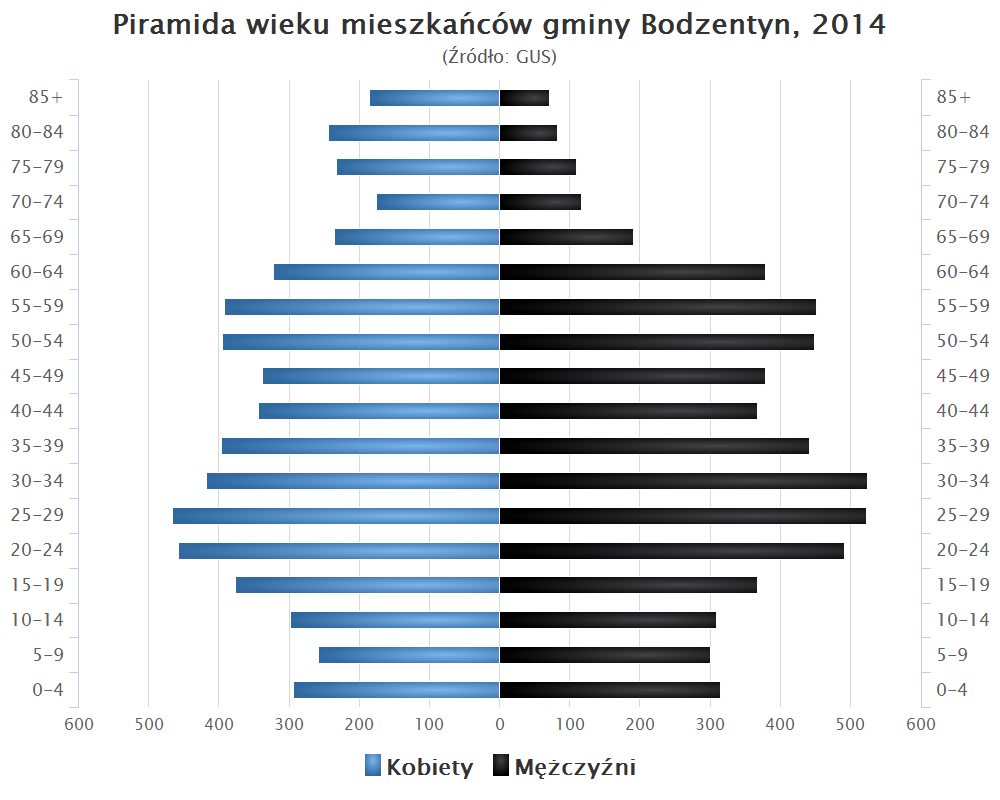
Piramida wieku Gmina Bodzentyn

Gmina Bodzentyn is an urban-rural gmina (administrative district) in Kielce County, Świętokrzyskie Voivodeship, in south-central Poland. Its seat is the town of Bodzentyn, which lies approximately 25 kilometres (16 mi) east of the regional capital Kielce.

The gmina covers an area of 160.32 square kilometres (61.9 sq mi), and as of 2006 its total population is 11,677, of which the population of Bodzentyn is 2,241, and the population of the rural part of the gmina is 9,436.

It is known for a unique version of kapusta that includes sheep intestine and kohlrabi. The gmina contains part of the protected area called Sieradowice Landscape Park.

== Villages ==
Apart from the town of Bodzentyn, Gmina Bodzentyn contains the villages and settlements of Celiny, Dąbrowa Dolna, Dąbrowa Górna, Hucisko, Kamieniec, Kamienna Góra, Leśna, Orzechówka, Podgórze, Podkonarze, Podmielowiec, Psary-Kąty, Psary-Podłazy, Psary-Stara Wieś, Ściegnia, Siekierno, Sieradowice Drugie, Sieradowice Pierwsze, Śniadka Druga, Śniadka Parcele, Śniadka Pierwsza, Śniadka Trzecia, Święta Katarzyna, Wiącka, Wilków, Wola Szczygiełkowa, Wzdół Rządowy and Wzdół-Kolonia.

== Neighbouring gminas ==
Gmina Bodzentyn is bordered by the gminas of Bieliny, Górno, Łączna, Masłów, Nowa Słupia, Pawłów, Suchedniów and Wąchock.
