= Bodzentyn =

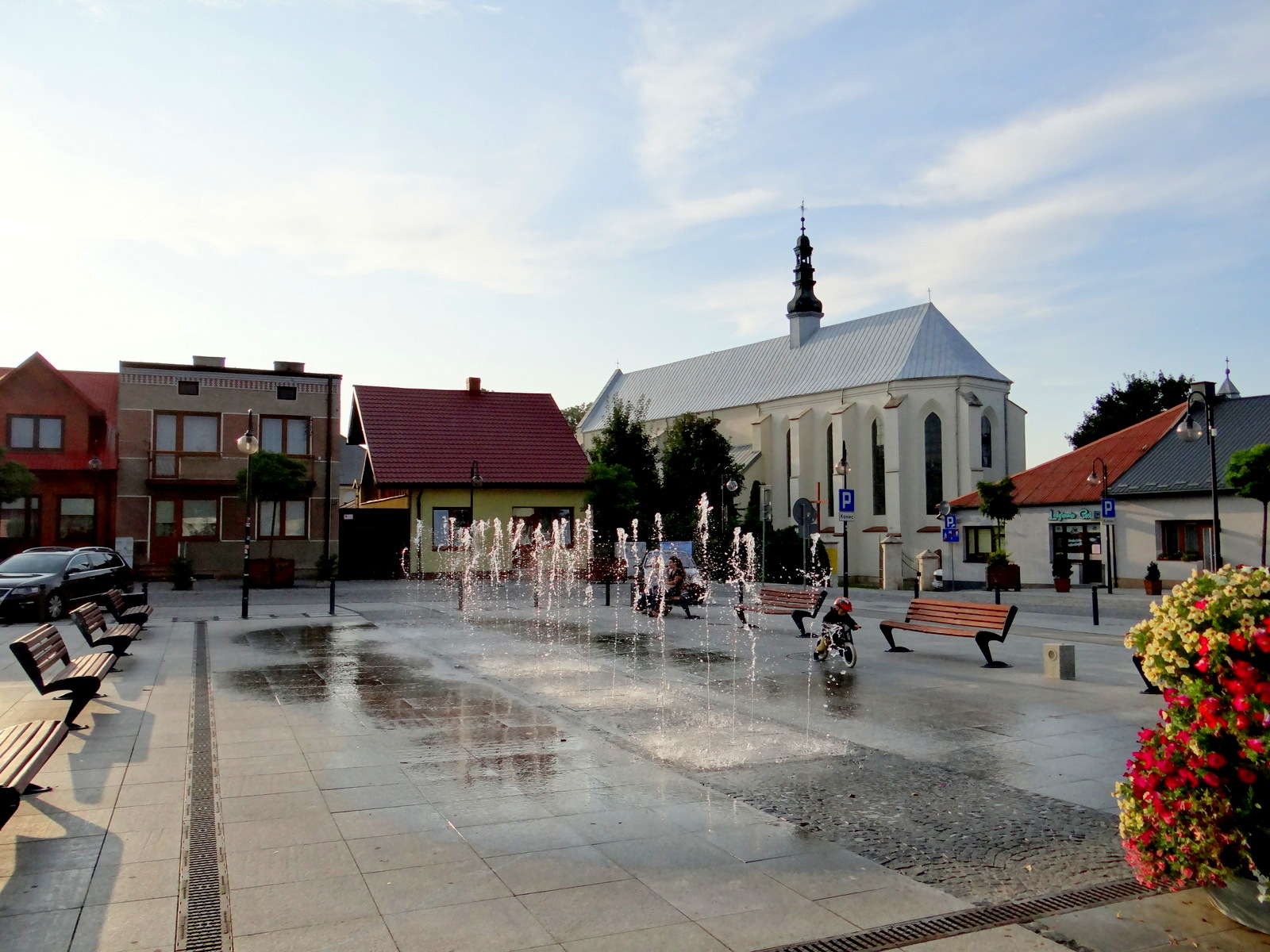
- Górny Rynek (Upper Market Square) with the Gothic Saint Stanislaus church in background

- Coat of arms

- Location within Poland
- Coordinates: 50°56′27″N 20°57′28″E
- Country: Poland
- Voivodeship: Świętokrzyskie
- County: Kielce
- Gmina: Bodzentyn
- Town rights: 1355

Government
  - Mayor: Dominik Dudek

Area
  - Total: 8.65 km^{2} (3.34 sq mi)

Population (31 December 2021)
  - Total: 2,168
  - Density: 251/km^{2} (650/sq mi)
- Time zone: UTC+1 (CET)
  - Summer (DST): UTC+2 (CEST)
- Postal code: 26-010
- Area code: +48 41
- Car plates: TKI
- Website: http://www.bodzentyn.pl

Bodzentyn [bɔˈd͡zɛntɨn] is a town in Kielce County, Świętokrzyskie Voivodeship, in south-central Poland, with 2,168 inhabitants as of December 2021. Bodzentyn belongs to Lesser Poland. The town lies in the Świętokrzyskie Mountains, here main office of the Świętokrzyski National Park is located.

== History ==
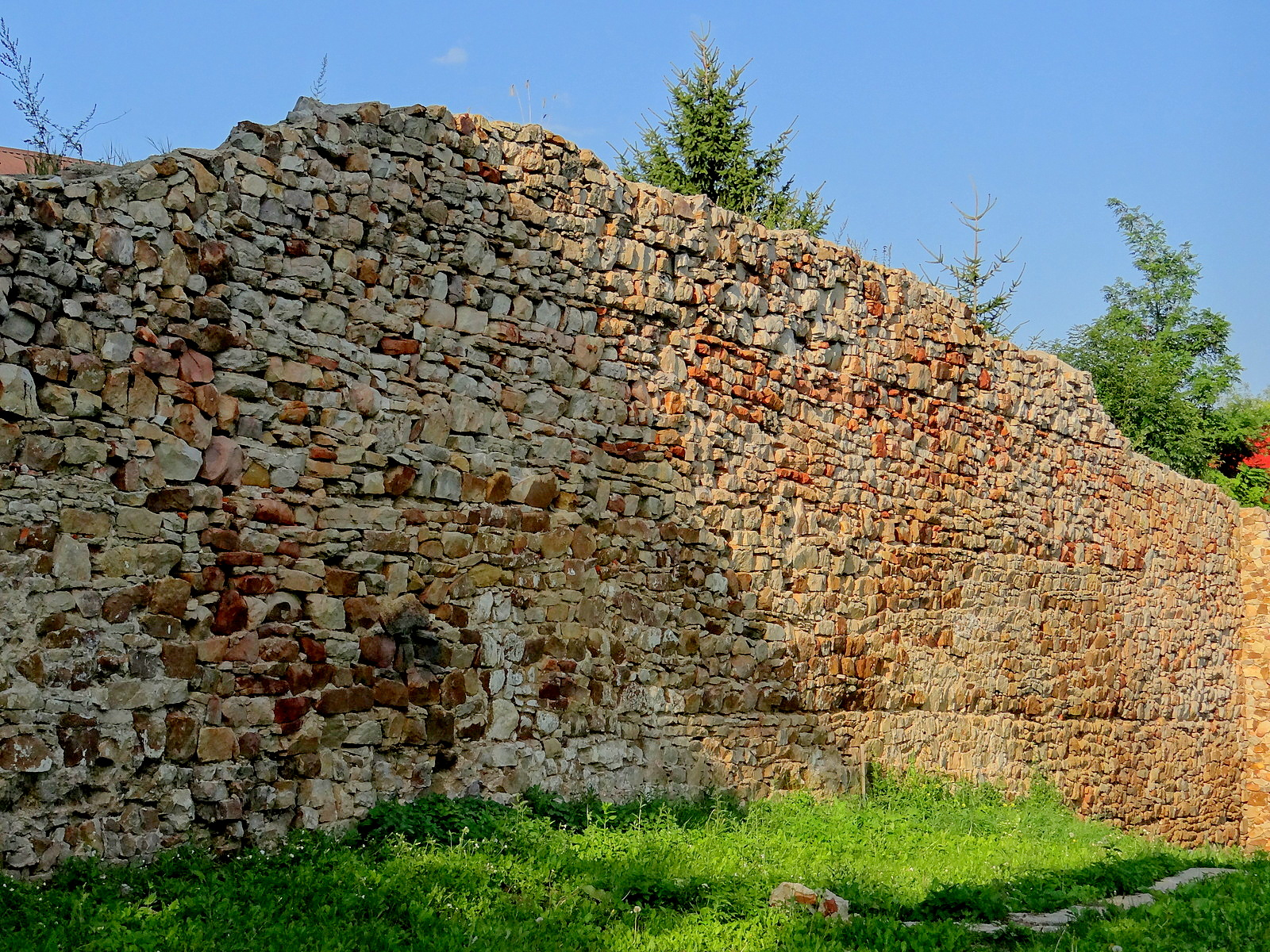
Medieval town walls

Bodzentyn (or Bodzentin, as it used to be called in documents) was founded in 1355 near the location of the ancient town of Tarczek, which belonged to the bishops of Kraków. Its charter was granted by King Casimir III the Great; the name of the town comes from bishop of Kraków, Jan Bodzanta. Bodzentyn was the center of land properties of the bishops of Kraków. In 1365 bishop Florian from Mokrsko built here a castle, and surrounded the town with defensive walls. In 1380 bishop Jan Radlica founded Holy Cross church, and in the late Middle Ages, Bodzentyn was one of the most important urban centers of northern Lesser Poland. In 1410 King Władysław II Jagiełło spent a few days here, on his way to the Battle of Grunwald. Soon afterwards, the town burned in a fire, so bishop Wojciech Jastrzębiec managed to convince the king to grant new privileges to Bodzentyn. Another bishop who contributed to the development of the town was Piotr Wysz Radoliński. He granted Bodzentyn's residents the rights to cut down forests, graze cattle, sell salt, meats and liquors. Furthermore, a marketplace was established. In 1450, Cardinal Zbigniew Oleśnicki founded here a Gothic collegiate church. The town was administratively located in the Sandomierz Voivodeship in the Lesser Poland Province.

In the 16th century, Bodzentyn continued to prosper, with six fairs organized here every year. Numerous artisan guilds existed here at that time: blacksmiths, shoemakers, tailors, cloth makers, butchers and others. The town enjoyed several royal privileges (1468, 1533, 1575), and together with whole Lesser Poland, it prospered in the period of Polish Golden Age. In the second half of the 16th century, the castle was turned into a palace, and at approximately same time, a second market square was created. Due to efforts of mayor Jan Kołek, Bodzentyn received waterworks and a public bath. Among notable persons who lived here were royal secretary bishop Franciszek Krasiński (who died 1577), and Crown chancellor Jakub Zadzik. Since 1640, Bodzentyn sent one person to study at the Kraków Academy, who after graduation was employed at a local school. In 1670 the town got a large town hall with a tall tower and a clock, funded by bishop Andrzej Trzebicki.

Unlike most town of Lesser Poland, Bodzentyn was not destroyed in the Swedish invasion of Poland (1655-1660). Soon afterwards, however, several natural disasters and plagues decimated the population. In 1662, Bodzentyn had 134 houses and 850 residents. In 1674, the population shrank to 540. In the 18th and 19th centuries Bodzentyn emerged as a local center of industry, with forges and several factories. Last bishop of Kraków who owned Bodzentyn was Kajetan Sołtyk.

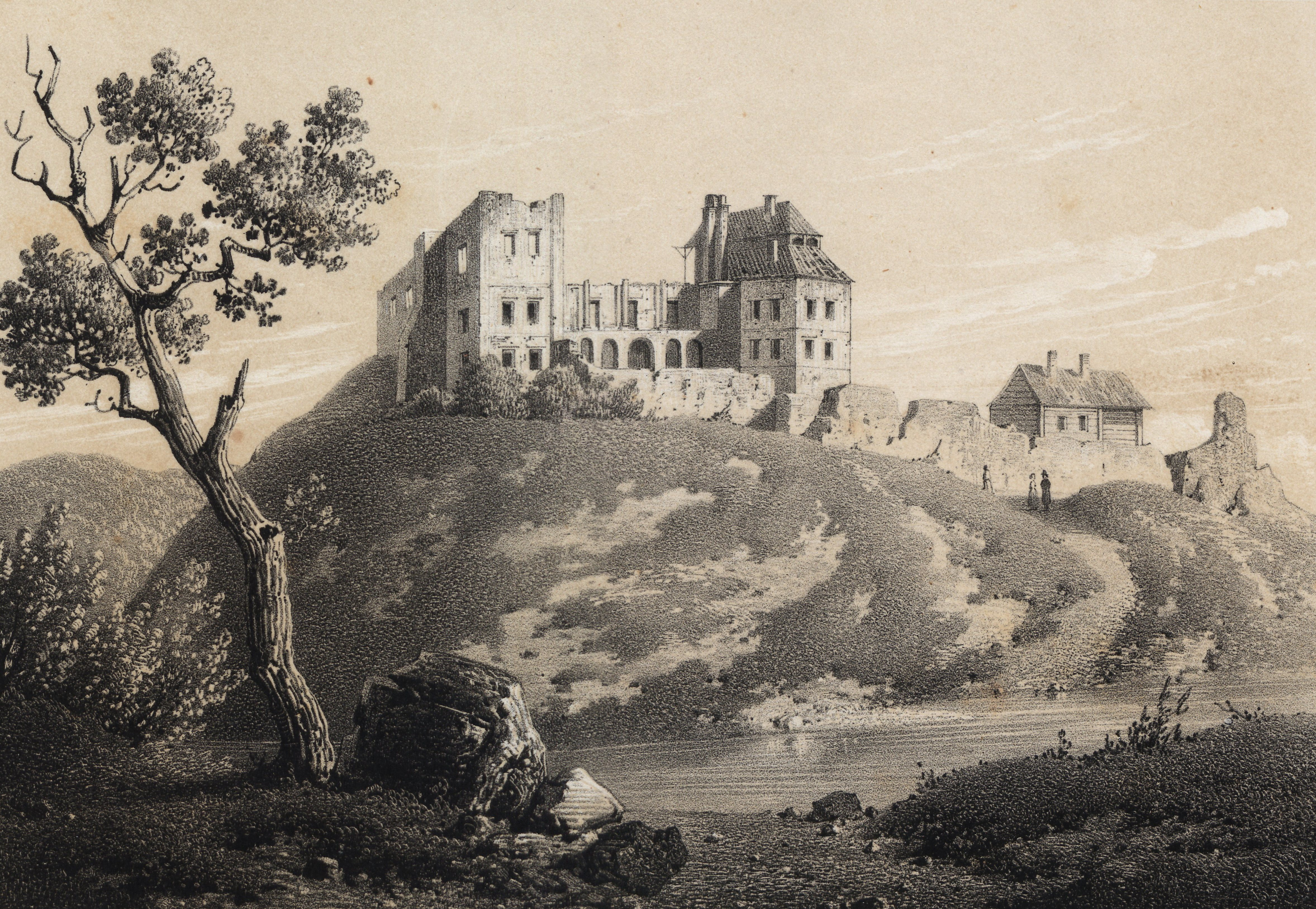
Bodzentyn Castle in the mid-19th century

In 1795, following the Third Partition of Poland, the town passed to the Austrian government. Its situation quickly deteriorated. After the Polish victory in the Austro-Polish War of 1809, it became part of the short-lived Duchy of Warsaw, and after the duchy's dissolution, it was part of Russian-controlled Congress Poland from 1815 to 1915. In 1832, the town hall was pulled down, and in 1836, parts of its ancient fortifications, together with Opatów Gate, were destroyed. In 1827 it had 203 houses and the population of 1,050.

Bodzentyn was one of major centers of the January Uprising in northern Lesser Poland. On the first night of the insurrection, it was attacked by the Polish rebels, and on 23 January 1864 a parade of rebel troops took place here, received by General Józef Hauke-Bosak. In 1870, Bodzentyn, whose population was 1500, lost its town charter and became a village. During World War I, on 20 June 1917, most of Bodzentyn burned in a fire. After the war, Poland regained independence and control of Bodzentyn. According to the 1921 census, it had a population of 3,093, 73.3% Polish and 26.4% Jewish.

=== World War II ===
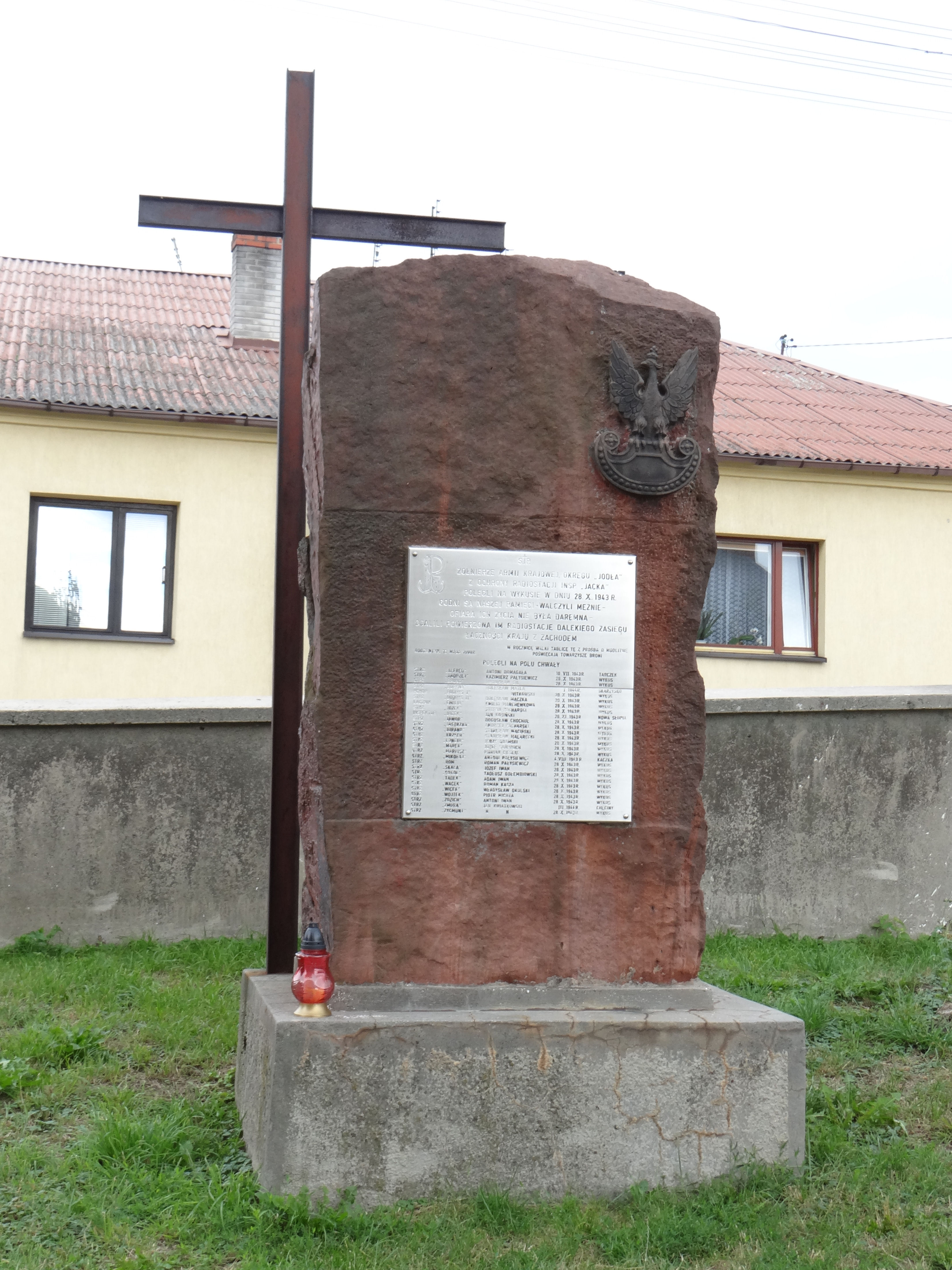
Memorial to local fallen Home Army partisans

Following the German-Soviet invasion of Poland, which started World War II in September 1939, it was occupied by Germany. Bodzentyn was an important center of Polish resistance. The hill of Wykus, a few kilometers from the village, served as a forest camp of local Home Army unit under Jan Piwnik. Germans were aware of it, and on 1 June 1943, men led by Albert Hugo Schuster pacified Bodzentyn, killing 39 people.

In the fall of 1940 the Jewish community, consisting of approximately 300 families, were faced with the responsibility to absorb a great number of impoverished Jews from the city of Płock. In the spring of 1941, all of them were confined in the open ghetto of Bodzentyn. The liquidation took place in the middle of September 1942, or on October 3, 1942, as one eyewitness account and another literary source suggest. The Jewish community was taken to Suchedniów and from there to the Treblinka extermination camp. The Diary of Dawid Rubinowicz, which is known to be one of the most touching testimonies of the fate of Jewish children during the Holocaust, was found in Bodzentyn in 1957. The first edition was published in 1960 in Polish and many other languages.

=== Recent period ===
In 1960, the population of Bodzentyn was almost 3,000, and the village regained its town charter in 1994.

== Main sights ==
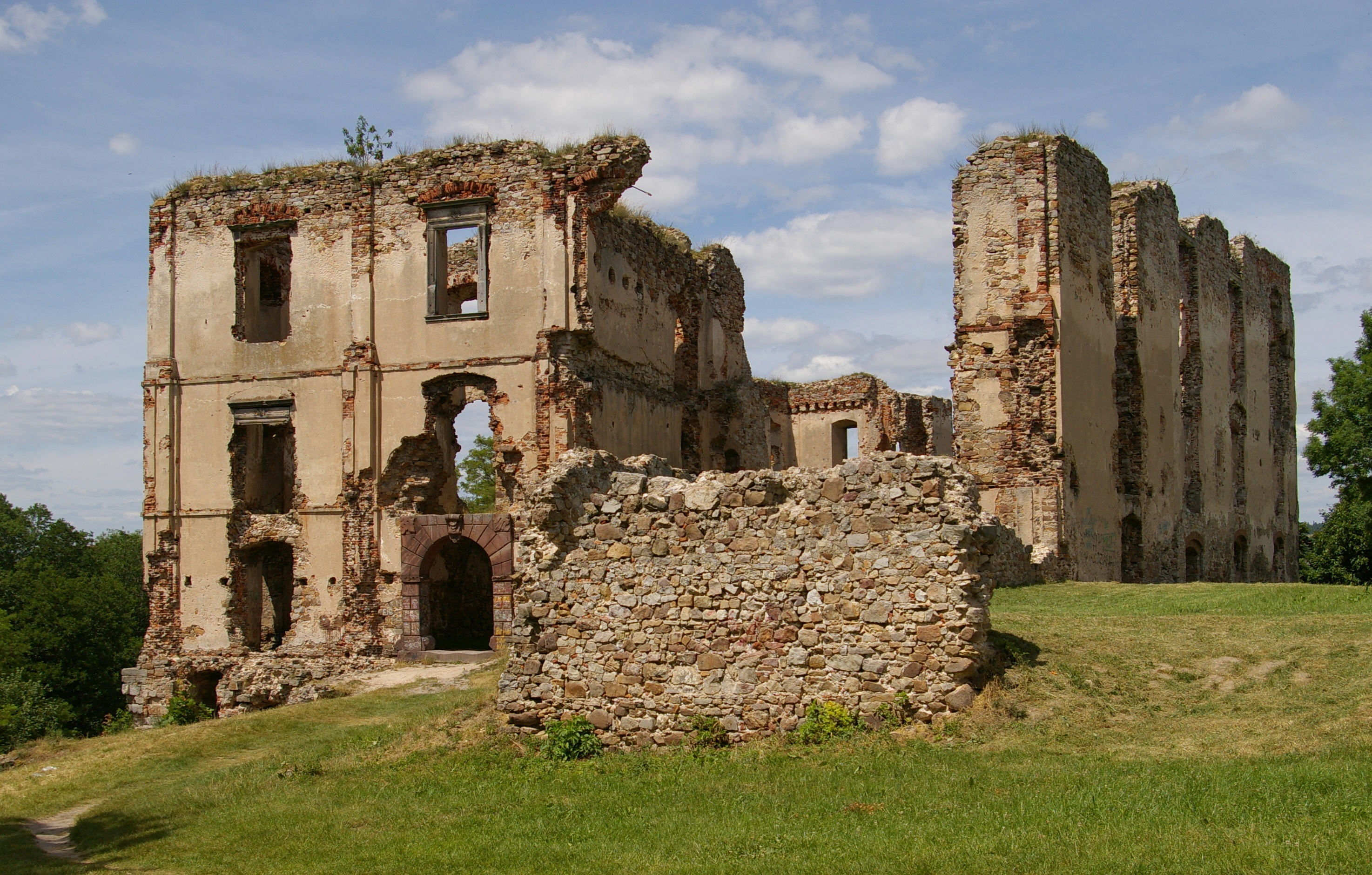
Ruins of the Bodzentyn Castle

- Gothic parish church (1440–1452)
- Church altar (first half of the 16th century)
- ruins of the 14th century Bodzentyn Castle
- Holy Spirit church (17th century)
- medieval shape of streets, with two market squares and remains of the 14th-century fortifications
- tenement houses (18th and 19th centuries)
- Czernikiewicz farm countryside museum
- The destruction of the Jewish Community
- The Jewish cemetery
