= Rawicz (disambiguation) =

Rawicz is a town in central Poland.

Rawicz may also refer to:

- Rawicz County
- Gmina Rawicz in Rawicz County
- Rawicz, Łódź Voivodeship
- Rawicz (surname)
- Rawicz Coat of Arms
- The pianist Marjan Rawicz (1898-1970), of the piano duo Rawicz and Landauer
