= Hucisko =

Hucisko may refer to the following places:

- Hucisko, Bełchatów County in Łódź Voivodeship (central Poland)
- Hucisko, Radomsko County in Łódź Voivodeship (central Poland)
- Hucisko, Lublin Voivodeship (east Poland)
- Hucisko, Wieliczka County in Lesser Poland Voivodeship (south Poland)
- Hucisko, Gmina Bodzentyn in Świętokrzyskie Voivodeship (south-central Poland)
- Hucisko, Kolbuszowa County in Subcarpathian Voivodeship (south-east Poland)
- Hucisko, Gmina Nowa Słupia in Świętokrzyskie Voivodeship (south-central Poland)
- Hucisko, Gmina Strawczyn in Świętokrzyskie Voivodeship (south-central Poland)
- Hucisko, Leżajsk County in Subcarpathian Voivodeship (south-east Poland)
- Hucisko, Gmina Ruda Maleniecka in Świętokrzyskie Voivodeship (south-central Poland)
- Hucisko, Gmina Słupia Konecka in Świętokrzyskie Voivodeship (south-central Poland)
- Hucisko, Gmina Stąporków in Świętokrzyskie Voivodeship (south-central Poland)
- Hucisko, Nisko County in Subcarpathian Voivodeship (south-east Poland)
- Hucisko, Rzeszów County in Subcarpathian Voivodeship (south-east Poland)
- Hucisko, Sucha County in Lesser Poland Voivodeship (south Poland)
- Hucisko, Przysucha County in Masovian Voivodeship (east-central Poland)
- Hucisko, Szydłowiec County in Masovian Voivodeship (east-central Poland)
- Hucisko, Częstochowa County in Silesian Voivodeship (south Poland)
- Hucisko, Lubliniec County in Silesian Voivodeship (south Poland)
- Hucisko, Zawiercie County in Silesian Voivodeship (south Poland)
