= Teresin =

Teresin may refer to the following places:

- Teresin, Kuyavian-Pomeranian Voivodeship (north-central Poland)
- Teresin, Gmina Białopole in Lublin Voivodeship (east Poland)
- Teresin, Gmina Leśniowice in Lublin Voivodeship (east Poland)
- Teresin, Gmina Żmudź in Lublin Voivodeship (east Poland)
- Teresin, Bełchatów County in Łódź Voivodeship (central Poland)
- Teresin, Brzeziny County in Łódź Voivodeship (central Poland)
- Teresin, Kutno County in Łódź Voivodeship (central Poland)
- Teresin, Rawa County in Łódź Voivodeship (central Poland)
- Teresin, Lesser Poland Voivodeship (south Poland)
- Teresin, Otwock County in Masovian Voivodeship (east-central Poland)
- Teresin, Sochaczew County in Masovian Voivodeship (east-central Poland)
- Teresin, Greater Poland Voivodeship (west-central Poland)

== See also ==
- Teresin massacre, crime committed by members of the Ukrainian Insurgent Army (UPA) and Ukrainian peasants, part of Volhynia genocide
- Terezín, a town in Litoměřice District in the Ústí nad Labem Region of the Czech Republic
