= Ravich =

Ravich or Ravitch is an East Slavic-language surname, a rendering of the Polish surname Rawicz. Notable people with the surname include:

- Ivan Ravich, c. 1677–1762), Ukrainian jeweller
- Lyubov Ravich (1923–2006), Soviet and Russian bibliographer and bibliographer, historian of Russian culture, poetess
- Melech Ravitch, Yiddish poet and essayist
- Rand Ravich
- Sarra Ravich
