= Wrzosy =

Wrzosy may refer to the following places in Poland:

- Wrzosy, Lower Silesian Voivodeship (south-west Poland)
- Wrzosy, Kuyavian-Pomeranian Voivodeship (north-central Poland)
- Wrzosy, Łódź Voivodeship (central Poland)
- Wrzosy, Lesser Poland Voivodeship (south Poland)
- Wrzosy, Greater Poland Voivodeship (west-central Poland)
- Wrzosy, Gliwice County in Silesian Voivodeship (south Poland)
- Wrzosy, Gmina Popów in Silesian Voivodeship (south Poland)
- Wrzosy, Gmina Przystajń in Silesian Voivodeship (south Poland)
- Wrzosy, West Pomeranian Voivodeship (north-west Poland)
