= Gręboszów =

Gręboszów may refer to the following places:

- Gręboszów, Lesser Poland Voivodeship (south Poland)
- Gręboszów, Łódź Voivodeship (central Poland)
- Gręboszów, Opole Voivodeship (south-west Poland)
