= Stoki =

Stoki may refer to the following places:

- Stoki, Lesser Poland Voivodeship (south Poland)
- Stoki, Łódź Voivodeship (central Poland)
- Stoki, Łódź, a neighbourhood in the city of Łódź
- Stoki, Podlaskie Voivodeship (north-east Poland)
- Stoki, Masovian Voivodeship (east-central Poland)
- Stoki, Lubusz Voivodeship (west Poland)
- Stoki, West Pomeranian Voivodeship (north-west Poland)
- Stoki, Szczecin
