= Podstoła, Łódź Voivodeship =

Podstoła
- Village
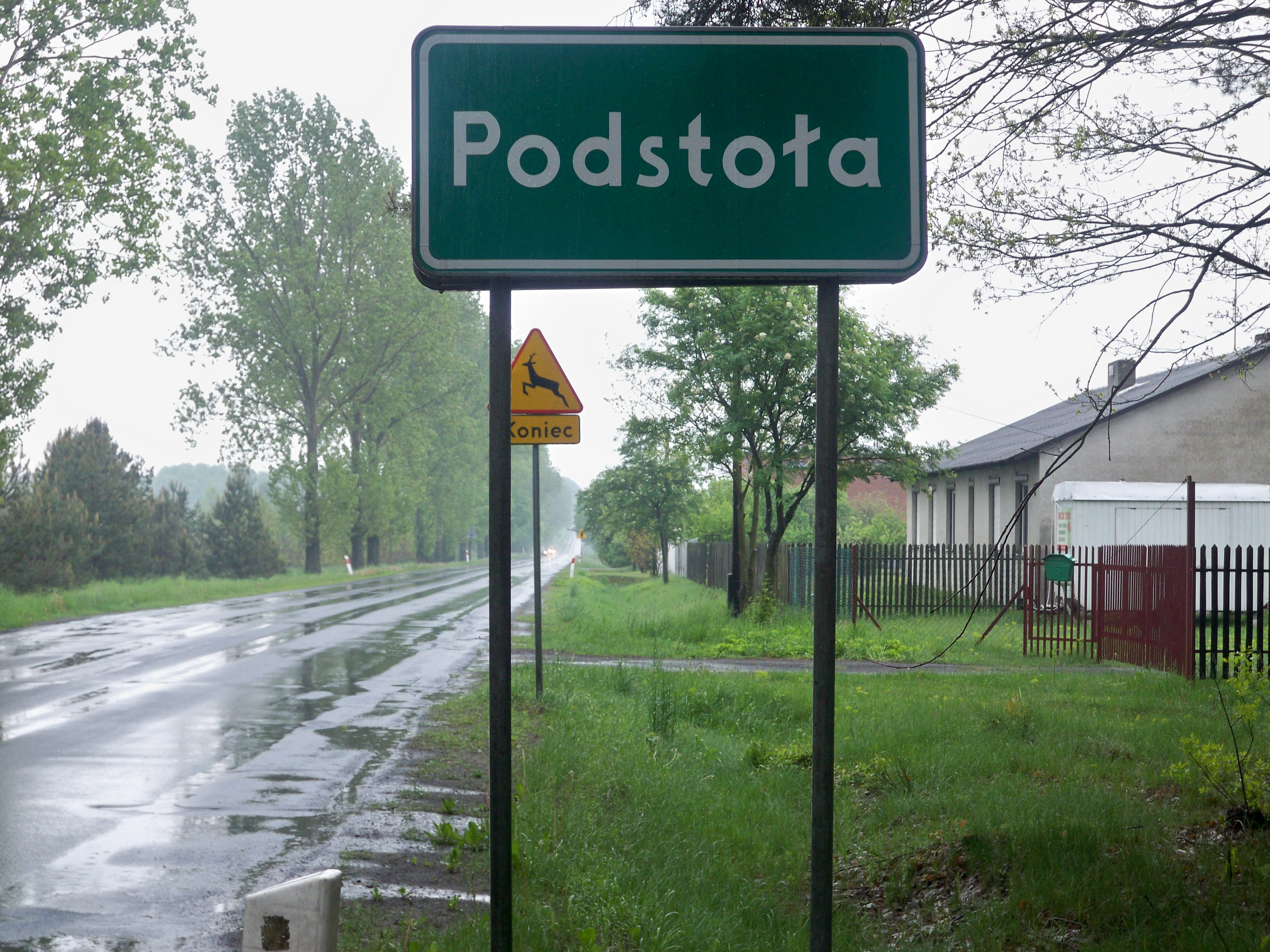

- Location within Poland
- Coordinates: 51°31′11″N 19°23′14″E
- Country: Poland
- Voivodeship: Łódź
- County: Bełchatów
- Gmina: Drużbice

Podstoła [pɔtsˈtɔwa] is a village in the administrative district of Gmina Drużbice, within Bełchatów County, Łódź Voivodeship, in central Poland.
