= Brzezie, Gmina Drużbice =

Brzezie
- Village
- Location within Poland
- Coordinates: 51°29′2″N 19°23′19″E
- Country: Poland
- Voivodeship: Łódź
- County: Bełchatów
- Gmina: Drużbice

Brzezie [ˈbʐɛʑɛ] is a village in the administrative district of Gmina Drużbice, within Bełchatów County, Łódź Voivodeship, in central Poland.
