= Rasy =

- Village
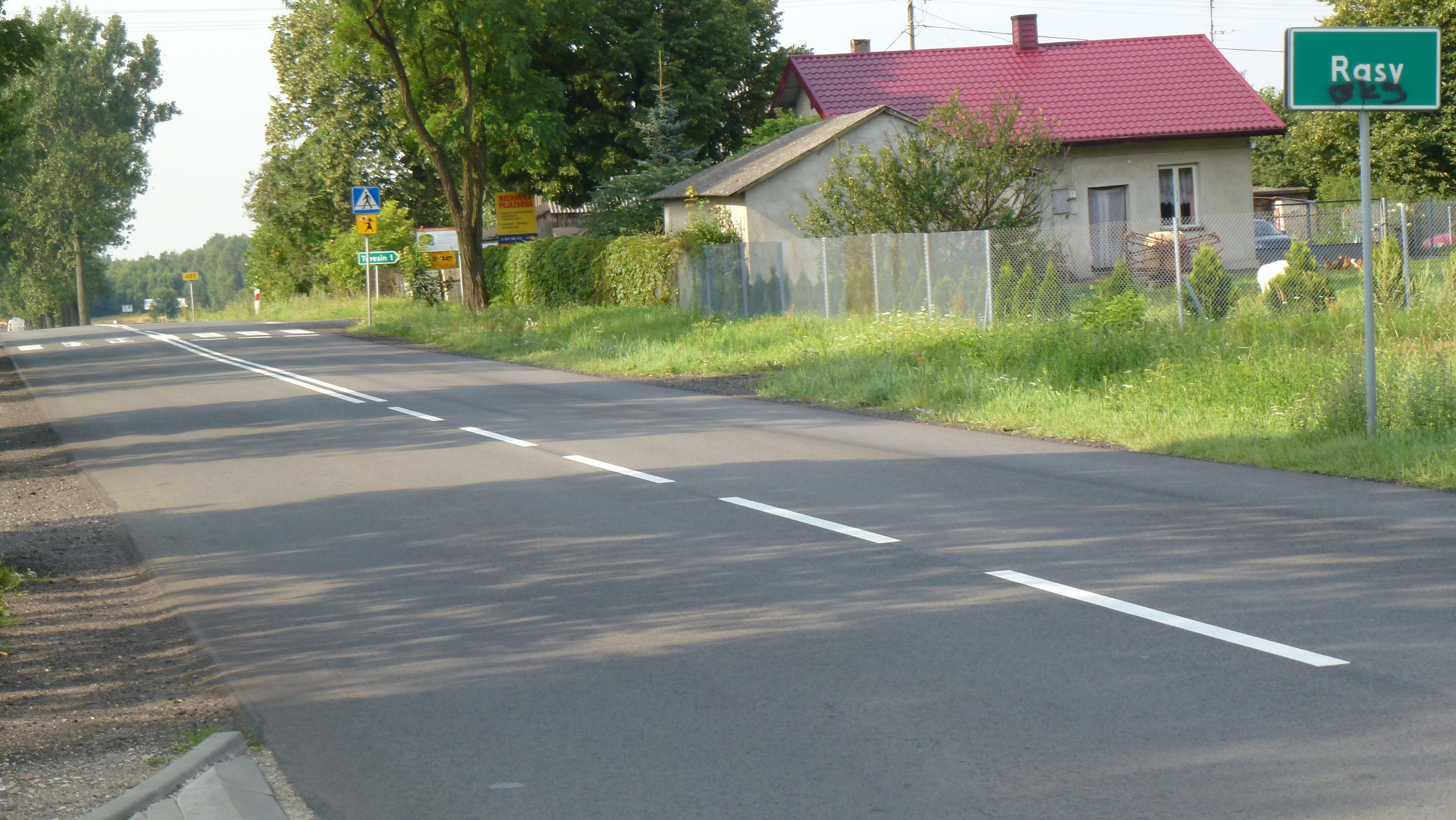

- Location within Poland
- Coordinates: 51°25′N 19°23′E
- Country: Poland
- Voivodeship: Łódź
- County: Bełchatów
- Gmina: Drużbice
- Population: 200

Rasy [ˈrasɨ] is a village in the administrative district of Gmina Drużbice, within Bełchatów County, Łódź Voivodeship, in central Poland.
