= Marki, Łódź Voivodeship =

Marki
- Village
- Location within Poland
- Coordinates: 51°27′6″N 19°20′15″E
- Country: Poland
- Voivodeship: Łódź
- County: Bełchatów
- Gmina: Drużbice
- Population: 20

Marki [ˈmarki] is a village in the administrative district of Gmina Drużbice, within Bełchatów County, Łódź Voivodeship, in central Poland.
