= Łęczyca, Bełchatów County =

Łęczyca
- Village
- Location within Poland
- Coordinates: 51°28′21″N 19°19′48″E
- Country: Poland
- Voivodeship: Łódź
- County: Bełchatów
- Gmina: Drużbice

Łęczyca (pronounced [wɛnˈt͡ʂɨt͡sa]) is a village in the administrative district of Gmina Drużbice, within Bełchatów County, Łódź Voivodeship, in central Poland.
