= Wola Głupicka =

- Village
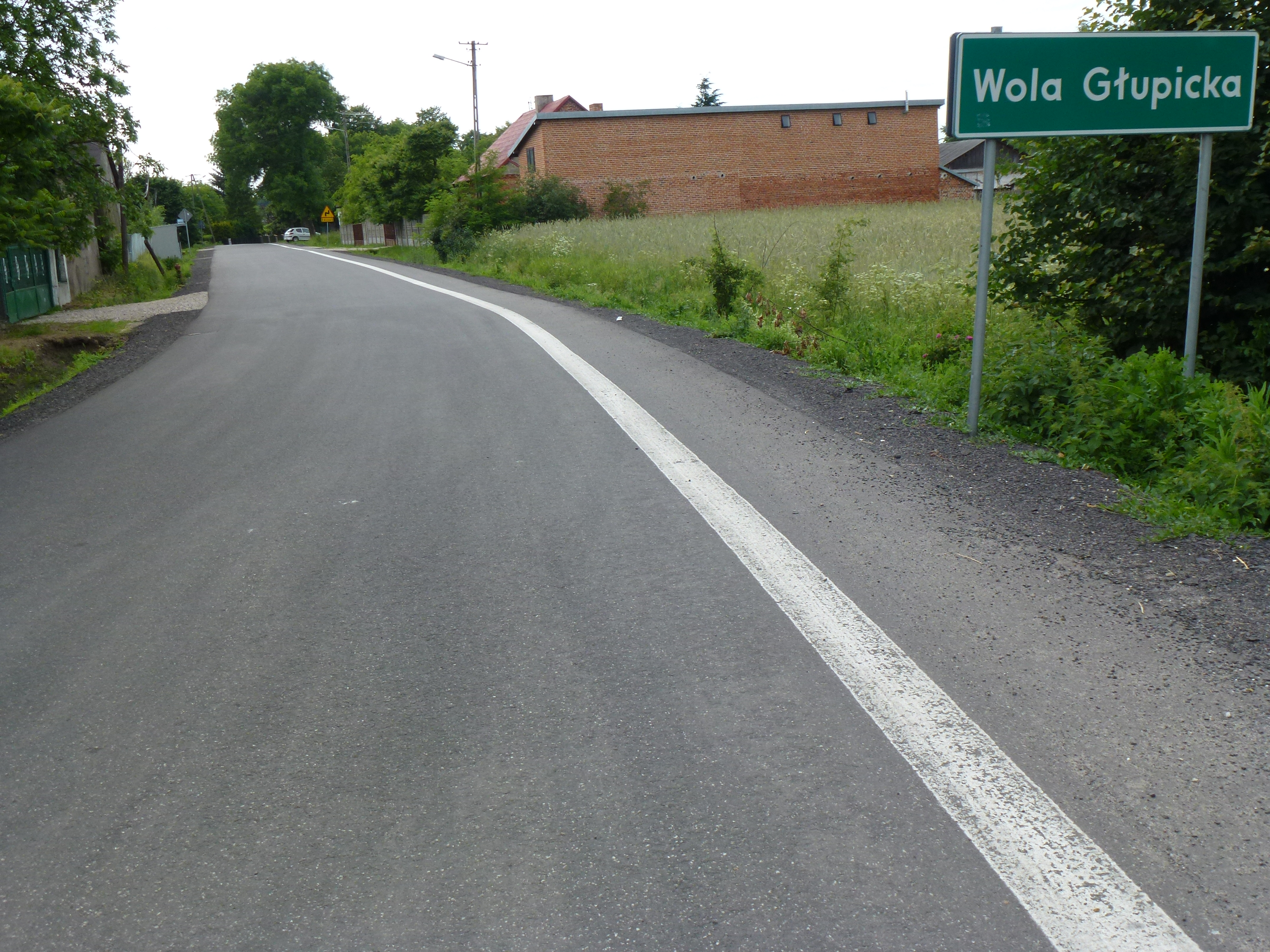

- Location within Poland
- Coordinates: 51°28′50″N 19°21′5″E
- Country: Poland
- Voivodeship: Łódź
- County: Bełchatów
- Gmina: Drużbice

Wola Głupicka [ˈvɔla ɡwuˈpit͡ska] is a village in the administrative district of Gmina Drużbice, within Bełchatów County, Łódź Voivodeship, in central Poland.
