= Janówek, Bełchatów County =

Janówek
- Village
- Location within Poland
- Coordinates: 51°30′48″N 19°19′07″E
- Country: Poland
- Voivodeship: Łódź
- County: Bełchatów
- Gmina: Drużbice

Janówek [jaˈnuvɛk] is a village in the administrative district of Gmina Drużbice, within Bełchatów County, Łódź Voivodeship, in central Poland.
