= Katarzynka, Łódź Voivodeship =

Katarzynka
- Village
- Location within Poland
- Coordinates: 51°26′21″N 19°23′30″E
- Country: Poland
- Voivodeship: Łódź
- County: Bełchatów
- Gmina: Drużbice
- Population: 20

Katarzynka [kataˈʐɨnka] is a village in the administrative district of Gmina Drużbice, within Bełchatów County, Łódź Voivodeship, in central Poland.
