= Zwierzyniec Duży =

- Village
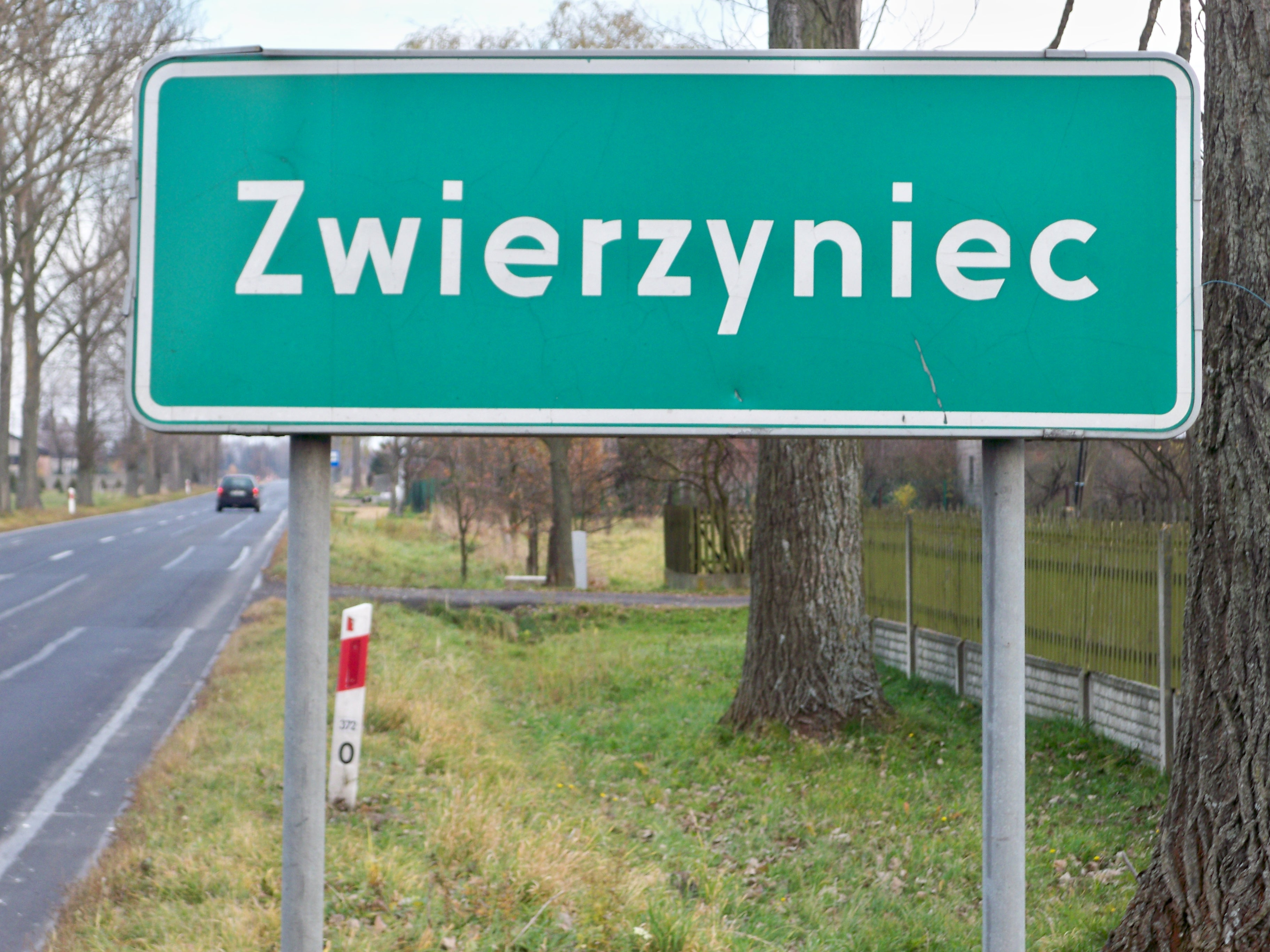

- Location within Poland
- Coordinates: 51°30′41″N 19°23′01″E
- Country: Poland
- Voivodeship: Łódź
- County: Bełchatów
- Gmina: Drużbice

Zwierzyniec Duży (Polish pronunciation: [zvjɛˈʐɨɲɛd͡z ˈduʐɨ]) is a village in the administrative district of Gmina Drużbice, within Bełchatów County, Łódź Voivodeship, in central Poland.
