= Drużbice =

- Village
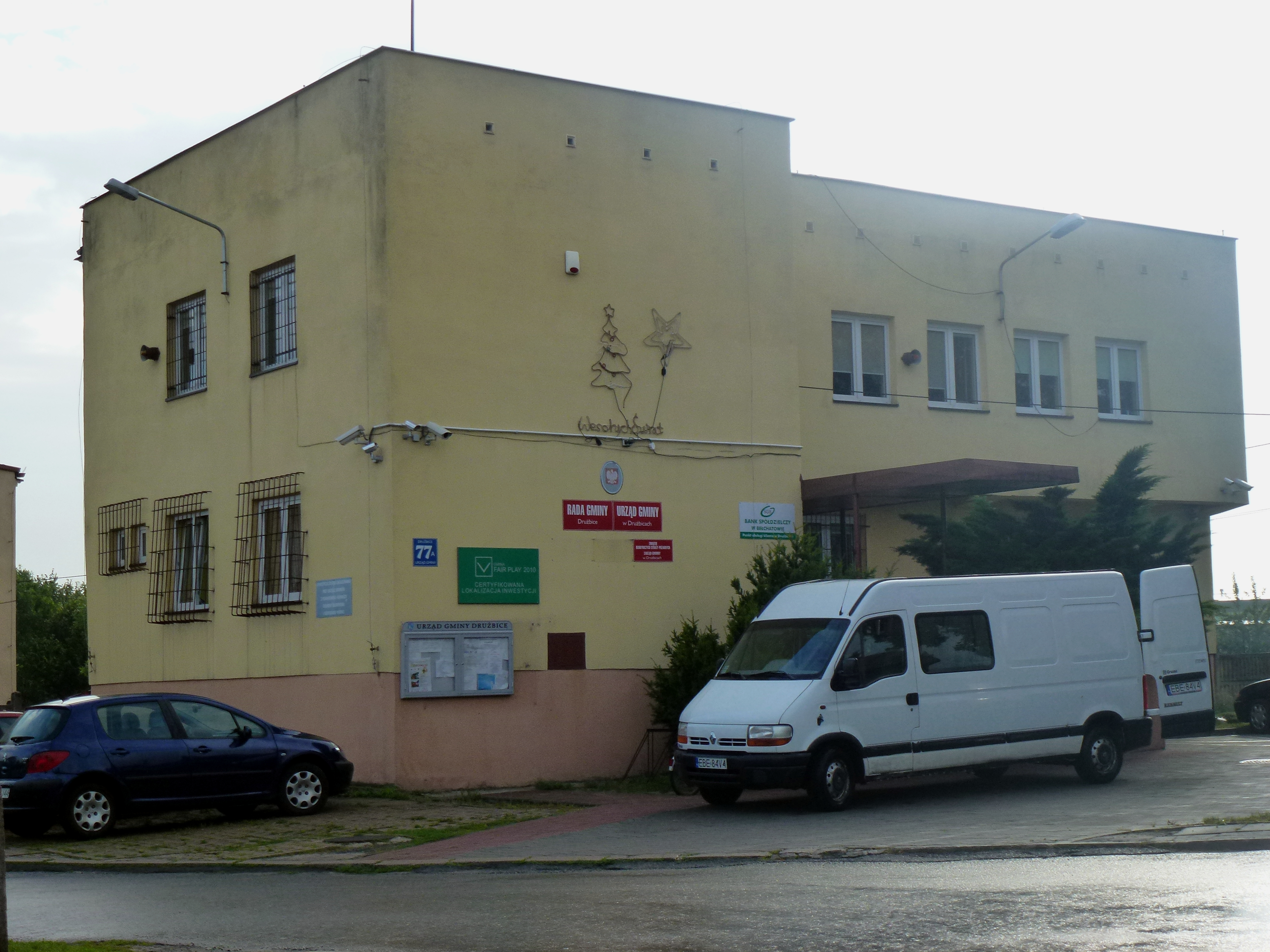
- Gmina office

- Location within Poland
- Coordinates: 51°28′N 19°24′E
- Country: Poland
- Voivodeship: Łódź
- County: Bełchatów
- Gmina: Drużbice
- Population: 530

Drużbice [druʐˈbit͡sɛ] is a village in Bełchatów County, Łódź Voivodeship, in central Poland. It is the seat of the gmina (administrative district) called Gmina Drużbice.
