= Pieńki Głupickie =

- Village
- Location within Poland
- Coordinates: 51°27′36″N 19°20′18″E
- Country: Poland
- Voivodeship: Łódź
- County: Bełchatów
- Gmina: Drużbice
- Population: 80

Pieńki Głupickie [ˈpjɛɲki ɡwuˈpit͡skʲɛ] is a village in the administrative district of Gmina Drużbice, within Bełchatów County, Łódź Voivodeship, in central Poland.
