= Głupice =

- Village
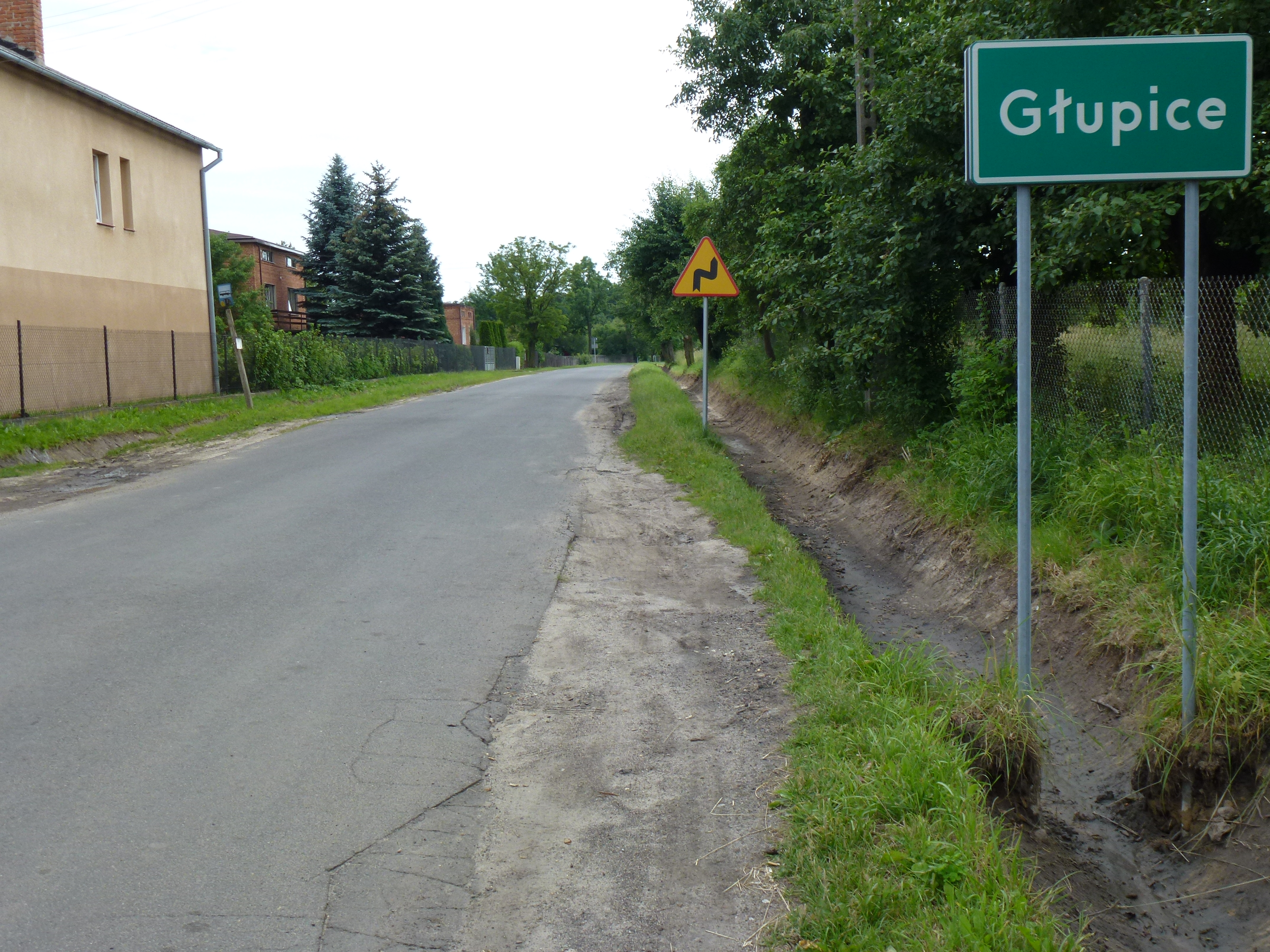

- Location within Poland
- Coordinates: 51°28′24″N 19°22′2″E
- Country: Poland
- Voivodeship: Łódź
- County: Bełchatów
- Gmina: Drużbice

Głupice [ɡwuˈpit͡sɛ] is a village in the administrative district of Gmina Drużbice, within Bełchatów County, Łódź Voivodeship, in central Poland.
