= Depszczyk =

- Village
- Location within Poland
- Coordinates: 51°30′56″N 19°25′19″E
- Country: Poland
- Voivodeship: Łódź
- County: Bełchatów
- Gmina: Drużbice

Depszczyk [ˈdɛpʂt͡ʂɨk] is a village in the administrative district of Gmina Drużbice, within Bełchatów County, Łódź Voivodeship, in central Poland.
