= Rawicz-Podlas =

- Village
- Location within Poland
- Coordinates: 51°29′51″N 19°26′48″E
- Country: Poland
- Voivodeship: Łódź
- County: Bełchatów
- Gmina: Drużbice

Rawicz-Podlas (Polish pronunciation: [ˈravit͡ʂ ˈpɔdlas]) is a village in the administrative district of Gmina Drużbice, within Bełchatów County, Łódź Voivodeship, in central Poland.
