= Patok, Łódź Voivodeship =

Patok
- Village
- Location within Poland
- Coordinates: 51°29′22″N 19°20′55″E
- Country: Poland
- Voivodeship: Łódź
- County: Bełchatów
- Gmina: Drużbice

Patok [ˈpatɔk] is a village in the administrative district of Gmina Drużbice, within Bełchatów County, Łódź Voivodeship, in central Poland.
