= Chynów, Łódź Voivodeship =

Chynów
- Village
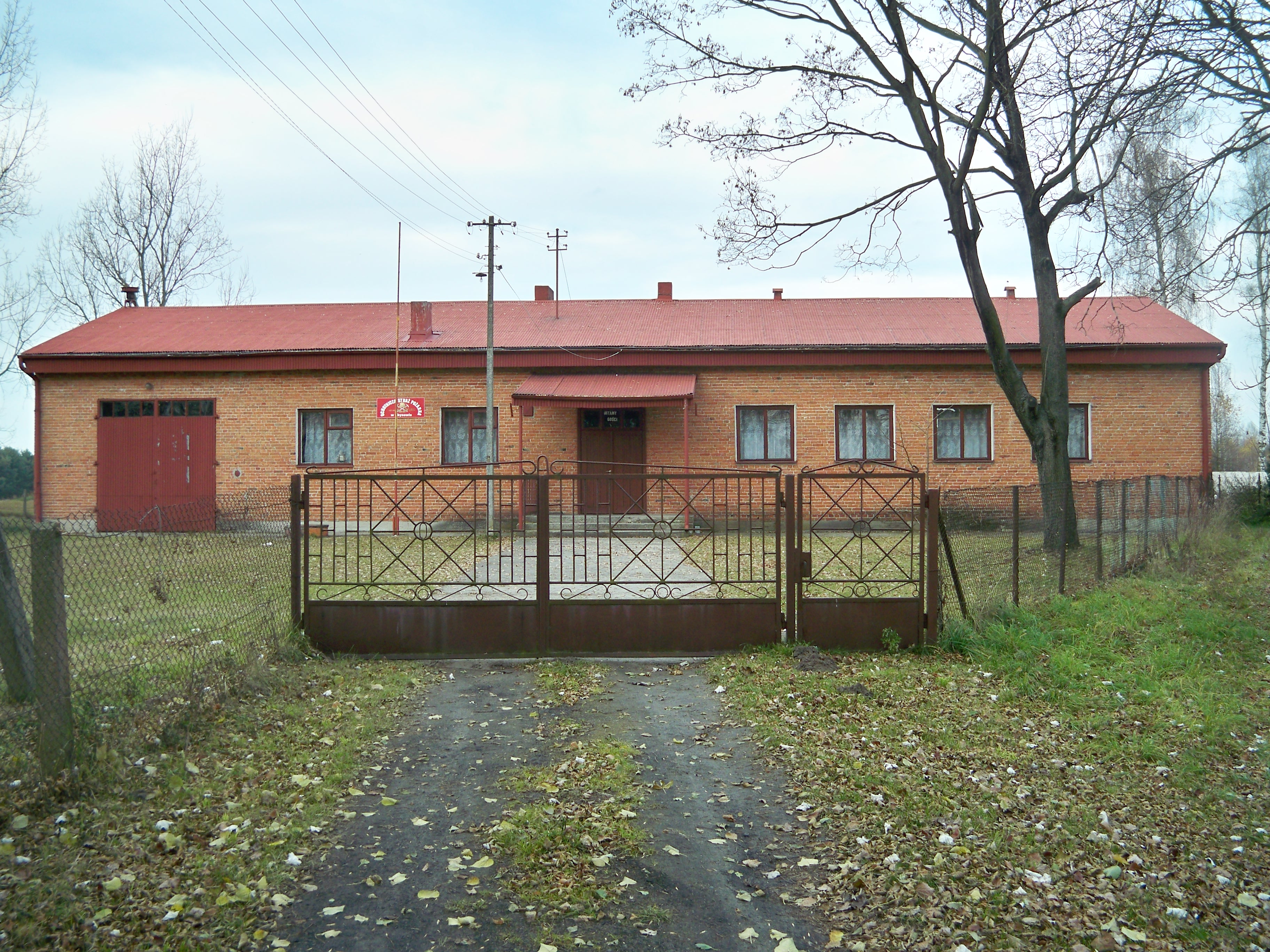

- Location within Poland
- Coordinates: 51°30′31″N 19°20′15″E
- Country: Poland
- Voivodeship: Łódź
- County: Bełchatów
- Gmina: Drużbice

Chynów [ˈxɨnuf] is a village in the administrative district of Gmina Drużbice, within Bełchatów County, Łódź Voivodeship, in central Poland.
