= Zabiełłów =

- Village
- Location within Poland
- Coordinates: 51°31′8″N 19°19′30″E
- Country: Poland
- Voivodeship: Łódź
- County: Bełchatów
- Gmina: Drużbice

Zabiełłów [zaˈbjɛu̯wuf] is a village in the administrative district of Gmina Drużbice, within Bełchatów County, Łódź Voivodeship, in central Poland.
