= Wola Rożniatowska =

- Village
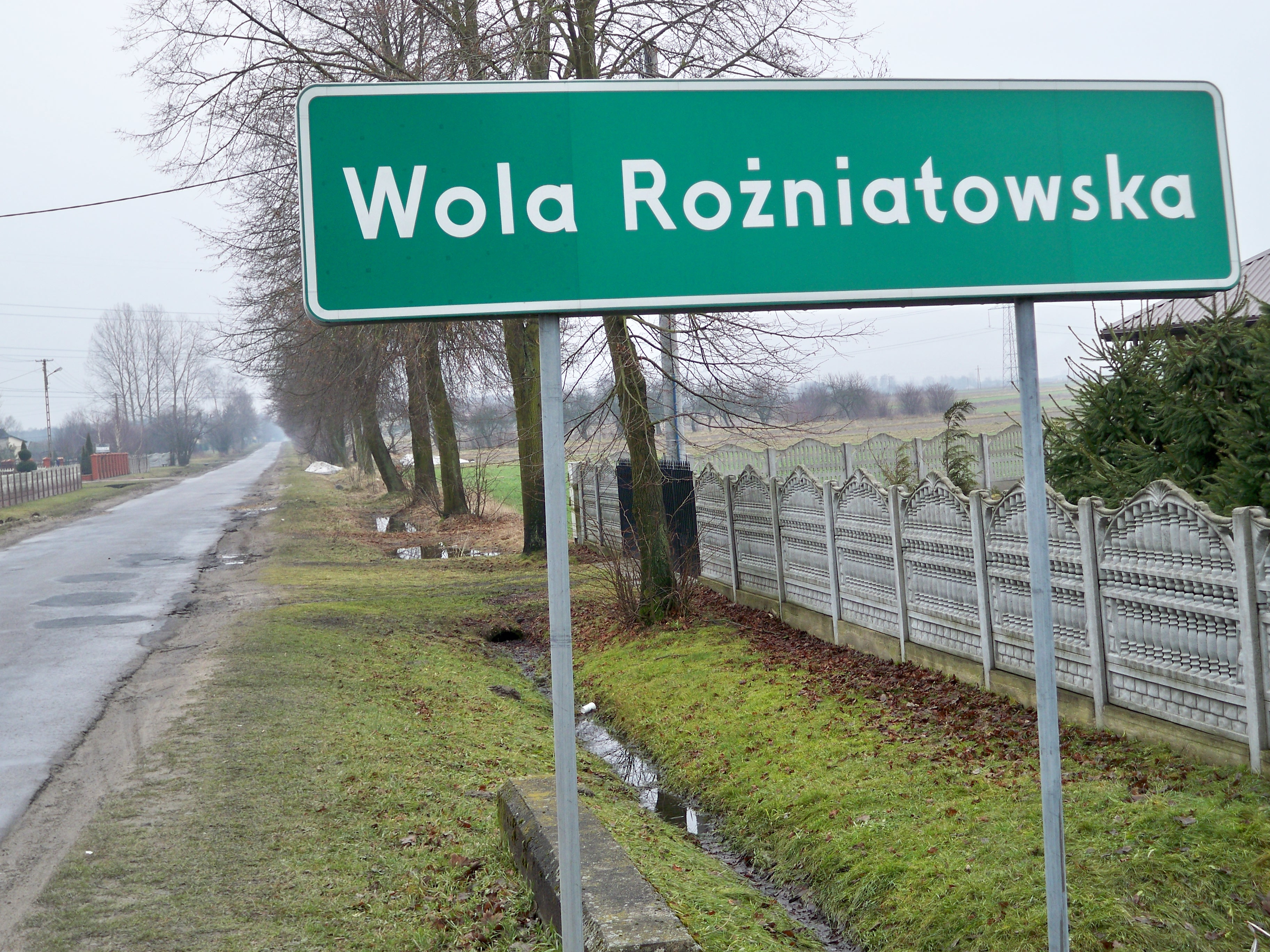

- Location within Poland
- Coordinates: 51°26′N 19°21′E
- Country: Poland
- Voivodeship: Łódź
- County: Bełchatów
- Gmina: Drużbice

Wola Rożniatowska [ˈvɔla rɔʐɲaˈtɔfska] is a village in the administrative district of Gmina Drużbice, within Bełchatów County, Łódź Voivodeship, in central Poland.
