= Teofilów, Gmina Drużbice =

Teofilów
- Village
- Location within Poland
- Coordinates: 51°27′18″N 19°21′37″E
- Country: Poland
- Voivodeship: Łódź
- County: Bełchatów
- Gmina: Drużbice
- Population: 80

Teofilów [tɛɔˈfiluf] is a village in the administrative district of Gmina Drużbice, within Bełchatów County, Łódź Voivodeship, in central Poland.
