= Łazy, Bełchatów County =

Łazy
- Village
- Location within Poland
- Coordinates: 51°29′26″N 19°24′46″E
- Country: Poland
- Voivodeship: Łódź
- County: Bełchatów
- Gmina: Drużbice

Łazy [ˈwazɨ] is a village in the administrative district of Gmina Drużbice, within Bełchatów County, Łódź Voivodeship, in central Poland.
