= Zofiówka, Bełchatów County =

Zofiówka
- Village
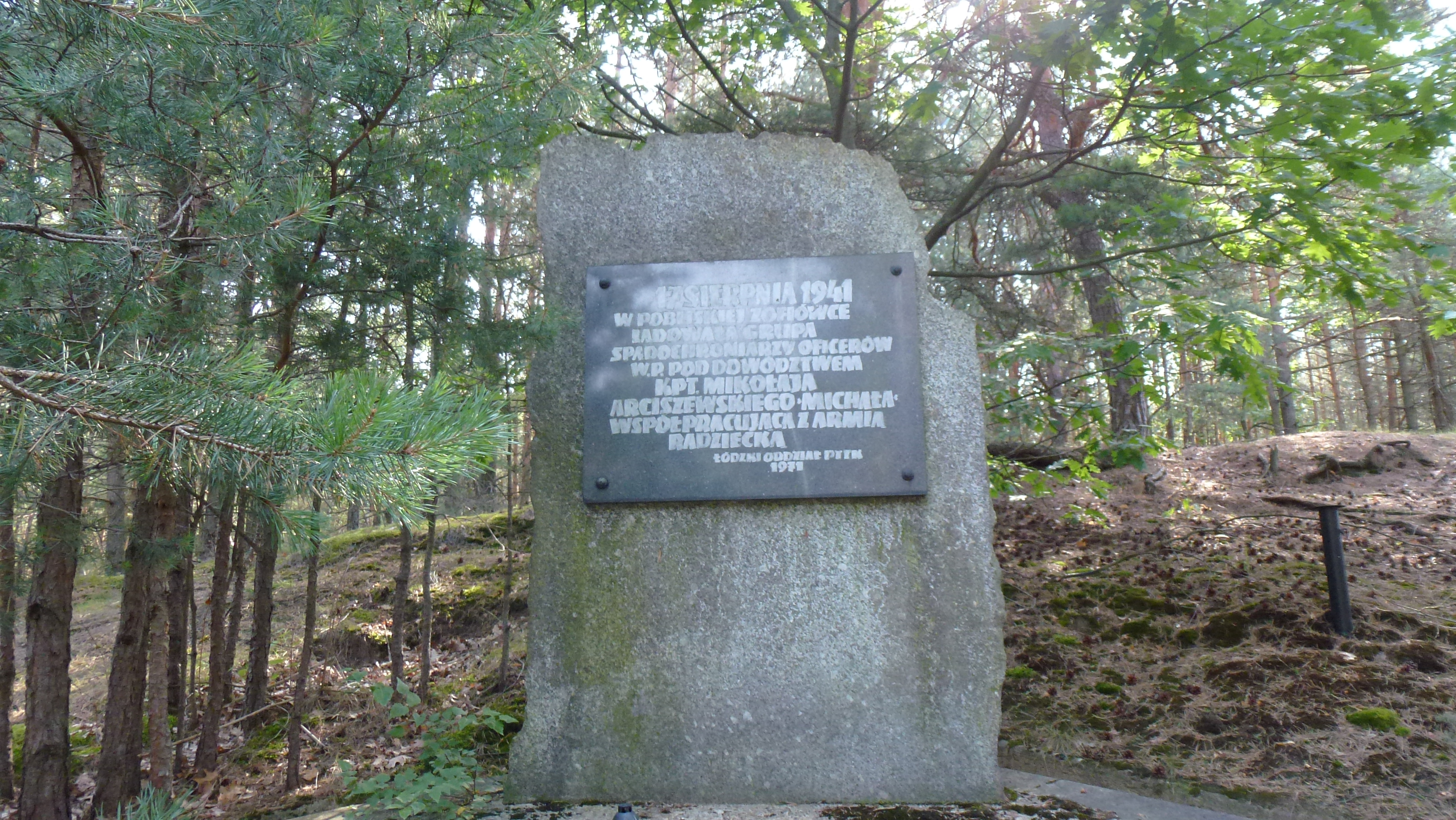

- Location within Poland
- Coordinates: 51°29′25″N 19°26′5″E
- Country: Poland
- Voivodeship: Łódź
- County: Bełchatów
- Gmina: Drużbice

Zofiówka [zɔˈfjufka] is a village in the administrative district of Gmina Drużbice, within Bełchatów County, Łódź Voivodeship, in central Poland.
