= Drużbice-Kolonia =

- Village
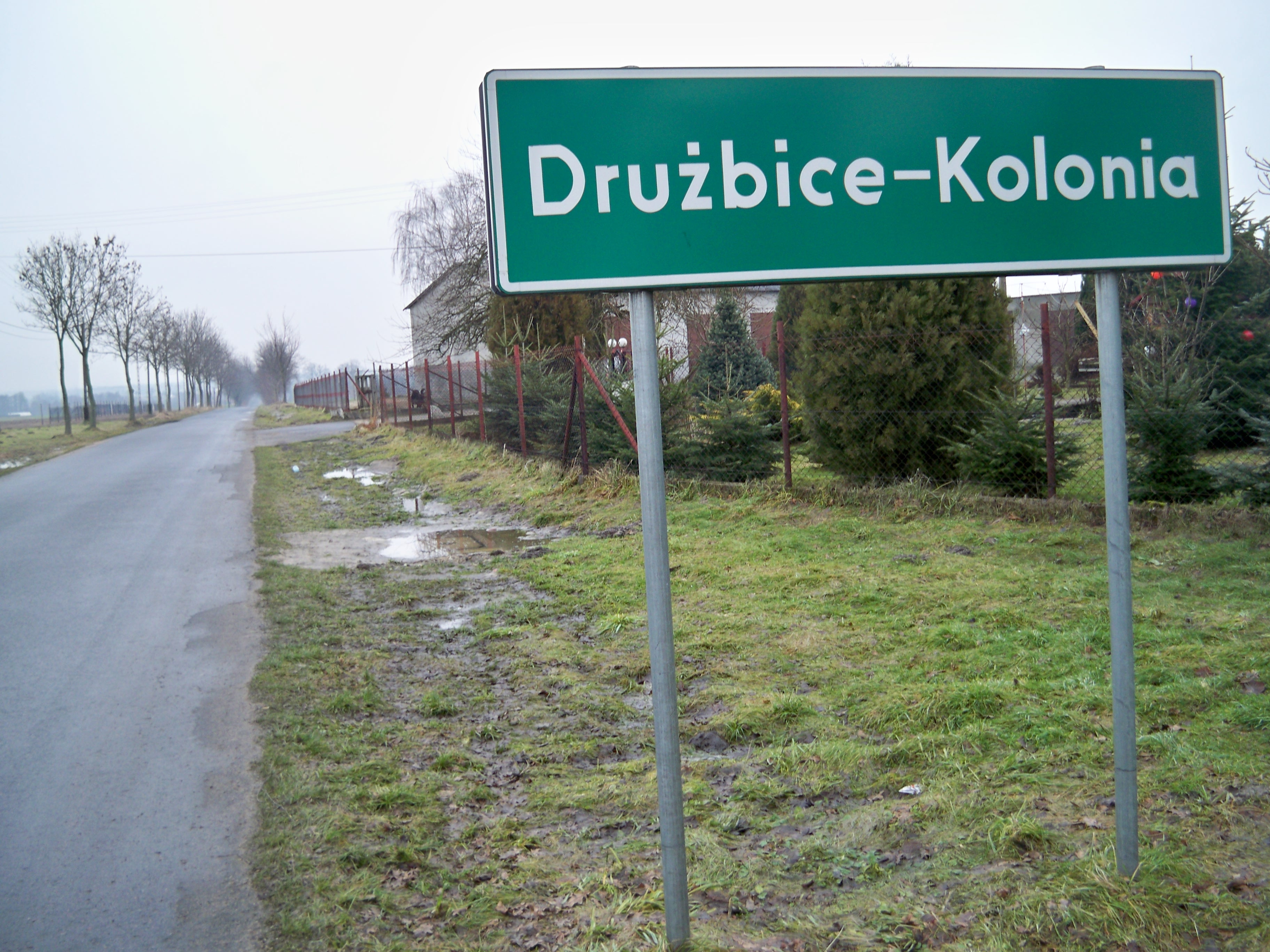
- Road to Drużbice-Kolonia

- Location within Poland
- Coordinates: 51°28′08″N 19°22′49″E
- Country: Poland
- Voivodeship: Łódź
- County: Bełchatów
- Gmina: Drużbice

Drużbice-Kolonia [druʐˈbit͡sɛ kɔˈlɔɲa] is a village in the administrative district of Gmina Drużbice, within Bełchatów County, Łódź Voivodeship, in central Poland.
