= Gadki =

- Village
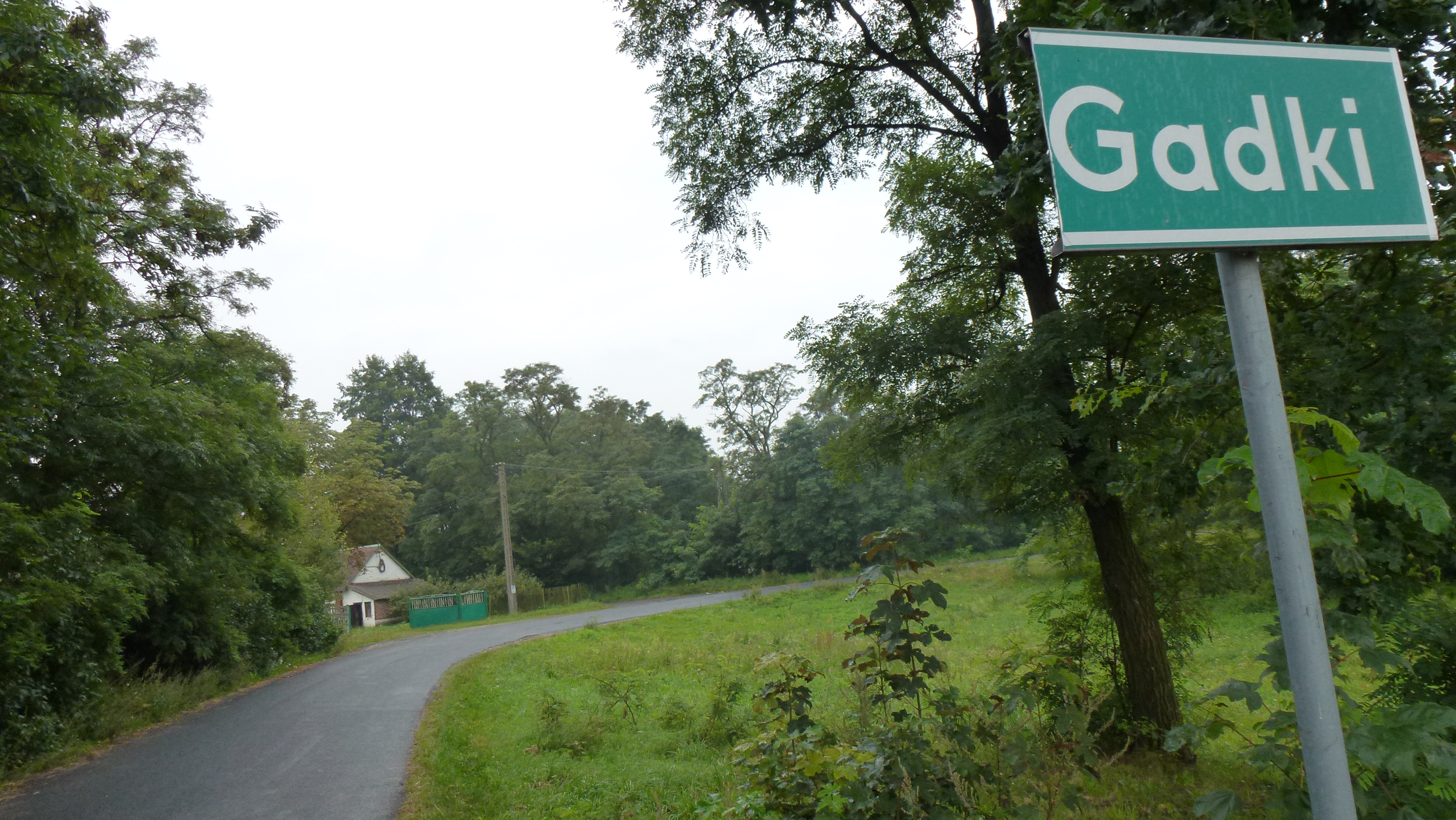

- Location within Poland
- Coordinates: 51°26′45″N 19°28′49″E
- Country: Poland
- Voivodeship: Łódź
- County: Bełchatów
- Gmina: Drużbice

Gadki (Polish pronunciation: [ˈɡatkʲi]) is a village in the administrative district of Gmina Drużbice, in Bełchatów County, Łódź Voivodeship, central Poland.
