= Wadlew =

- Village
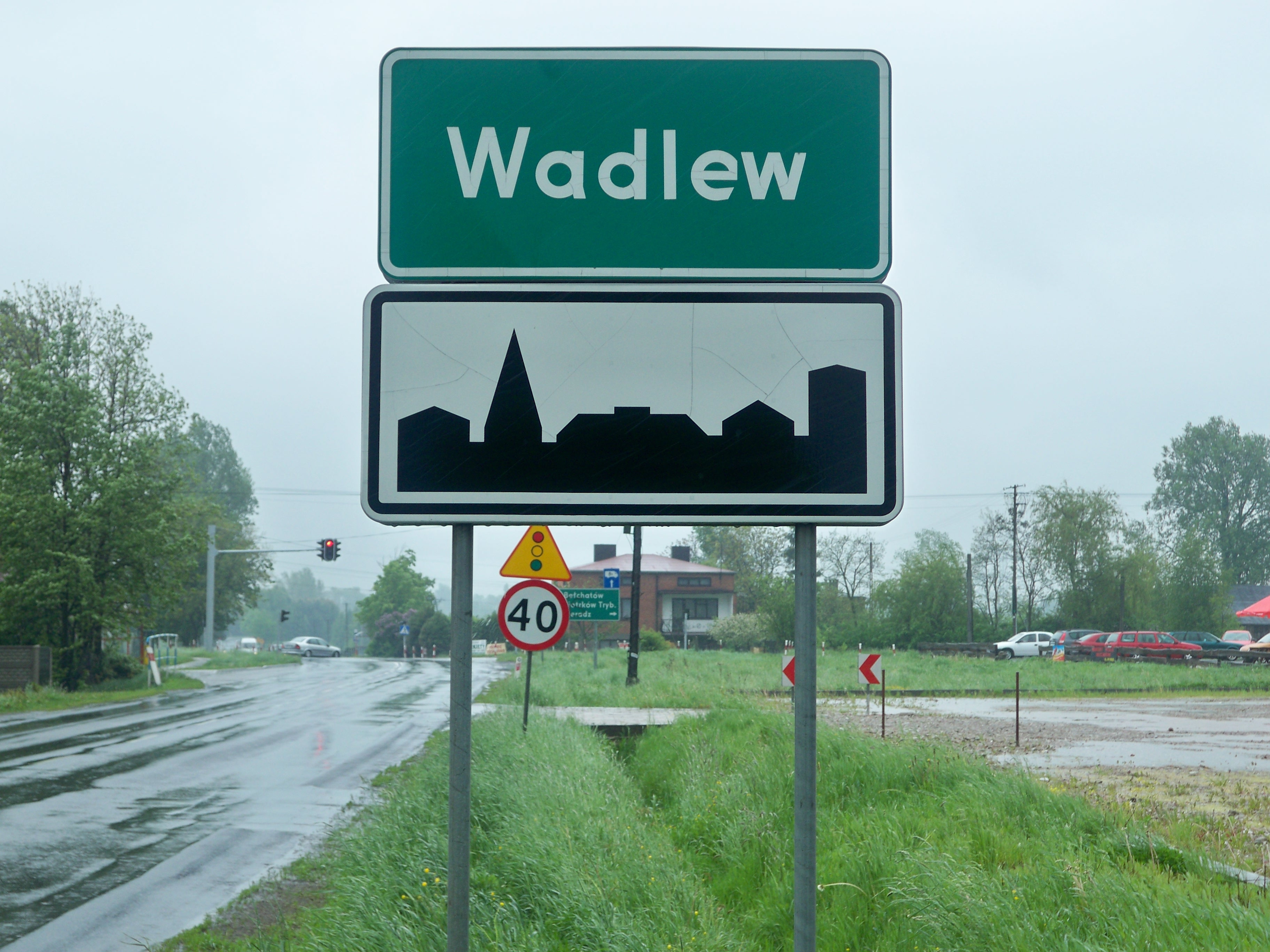

- Location within Poland
- Coordinates: 51°31′N 19°25′E
- Country: Poland
- Voivodeship: Łódź
- County: Bełchatów
- Gmina: Drużbice
- Population: 470

Wadlew [ˈvadlɛf] is a village in the administrative district of Gmina Drużbice, within Bełchatów County, Łódź Voivodeship, in central Poland.
