= Stefanów, Bełchatów County =

Stefanów
- Village
- Location within Poland
- Coordinates: 51°25′38″N 19°26′26″E
- Country: Poland
- Voivodeship: Łódź
- County: Bełchatów
- Gmina: Drużbice

Stefanów [stɛˈfanuf] is a village in the administrative district of Gmina Drużbice, within Bełchatów County, Łódź Voivodeship, in central Poland.
