= Żbijowa =

- Village
- Location within Poland
- Coordinates: 51°26′31″N 19°25′20″E
- Country: Poland
- Voivodeship: Łódź
- County: Bełchatów
- Gmina: Drużbice
- Population: 60

Żbijowa [ʐbiˈjɔva] is a village in the administrative district of Gmina Drużbice, within Bełchatów County, Łódź Voivodeship, in central Poland.
