= Gmina Drużbice =

Gmina Drużbice Drużbice Commune
- Gmina
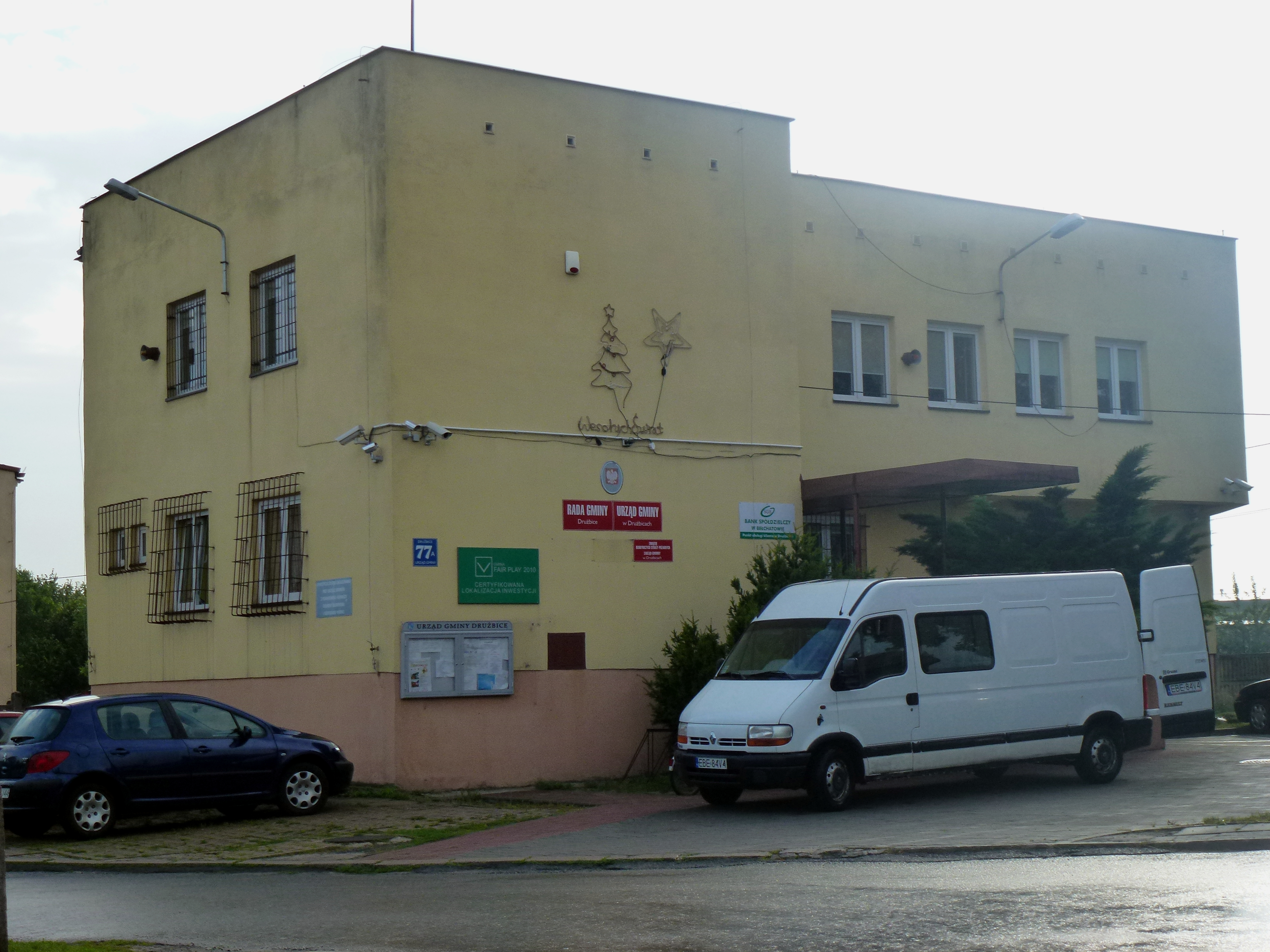
- Municipal hall

- Flag Coat of arms
- Interactive map of Gmina Drużbice
- Coordinates (Drużbice): 51°28′N 19°24′E
- Country: Poland
- Voivodeship: Łódź
- County: Bełchatów
- Seat: Drużbice

Area
  - Total: 114.52 km^{2} (44.22 sq mi)

Population (2006)
  - Total: 4,873
  - Density: 42.55/km^{2} (110.2/sq mi)
- Time zone: UTC+1 (CET)
  - Summer (DST): UTC+2 (CEST)
- Website: www.druzbice.pl

Gmina Drużbice is a rural gmina (administrative district) in Bełchatów County, Łódź Voivodeship, in central Poland. Its seat is the village of Drużbice, which lies approximately 12 kilometres (7 mi) north of Bełchatów and 36 km (22 mi) south of the regional capital Łódź.

The gmina covers an area of 114.52 square kilometres (44.2 sq mi), and as of 2006 its total population is 4,873.

== Villages ==
Gmina Drużbice contains the villages and settlements of:

- Brzezie
- Bukowie Dolne
- Bukowie Górne
- Chynów
- Depszczyk
- Drużbice
- Drużbice-Kolonia
- Gadki
- Głupice
- Głupice-Parcela
- Gręboszów
- Helenów
- Hucisko
- Janówek
- Józefów
- Kącik
- Katarzynka
- Kazimierzów
- Kobyłki
- Łazy
- Łęczyca
- Marki
- Nowa Wieś
- Patok
- Pieńki Głupickie
- Podstoła
- Rasy
- Rawicz
- Rawicz-Podlas
- Rożniatowice
- Skrajne
- Stefanów
- Stoki
- Suchcice
- Teofilów
- Teresin
- Wadlew
- Wdowin
- Wdowin-Kolonia
- Wola Głupicka
- Wola Rożniatowska
- Wrzosy
- Zabiełłów
- Zalesie
- Żbijowa
- Zofiówka
- Zwierzyniec Duży

== Neighbouring gminas ==
Gmina Drużbice is bordered by the gminas of Bełchatów, Dłutów, Grabica, Wola Krzysztoporska and Zelów.
