= Nowa Wieś, Bełchatów County =

Nowa Wieś
- Village
- Location within Poland
- Coordinates: 51°25′31″N 19°21′56″E
- Country: Poland
- Voivodeship: Łódź
- County: Bełchatów
- Gmina: Drużbice
- Population: 40

Nowa Wieś [ˈnɔva ˈvjɛɕ] is a village in the administrative district of Gmina Drużbice, within Bełchatów County, Łódź Voivodeship, in central Poland.
