= Józefów, Gmina Drużbice =

Józefów
- Village
- Location within Poland
- Coordinates: 51°30′14″N 19°26′18″E
- Country: Poland
- Voivodeship: Łódź
- County: Bełchatów
- Gmina: Drużbice

Józefów (Polish pronunciation: [juˈzɛfuf]) is a village in the administrative district of Gmina Drużbice, within Bełchatów County, Łódź Voivodeship, in central Poland.
