= Helenów, Gmina Drużbice =

Helenów
- Village
- Location within Poland
- Coordinates: 51°30′28″N 19°27′11″E
- Country: Poland
- Voivodeship: Łódź
- County: Bełchatów
- Gmina: Drużbice

Helenów [xɛˈlɛnuf] is a village in the administrative district of Gmina Drużbice, within Bełchatów County, Łódź Voivodeship, in central Poland.
