= Wdowin-Kolonia =

- Village
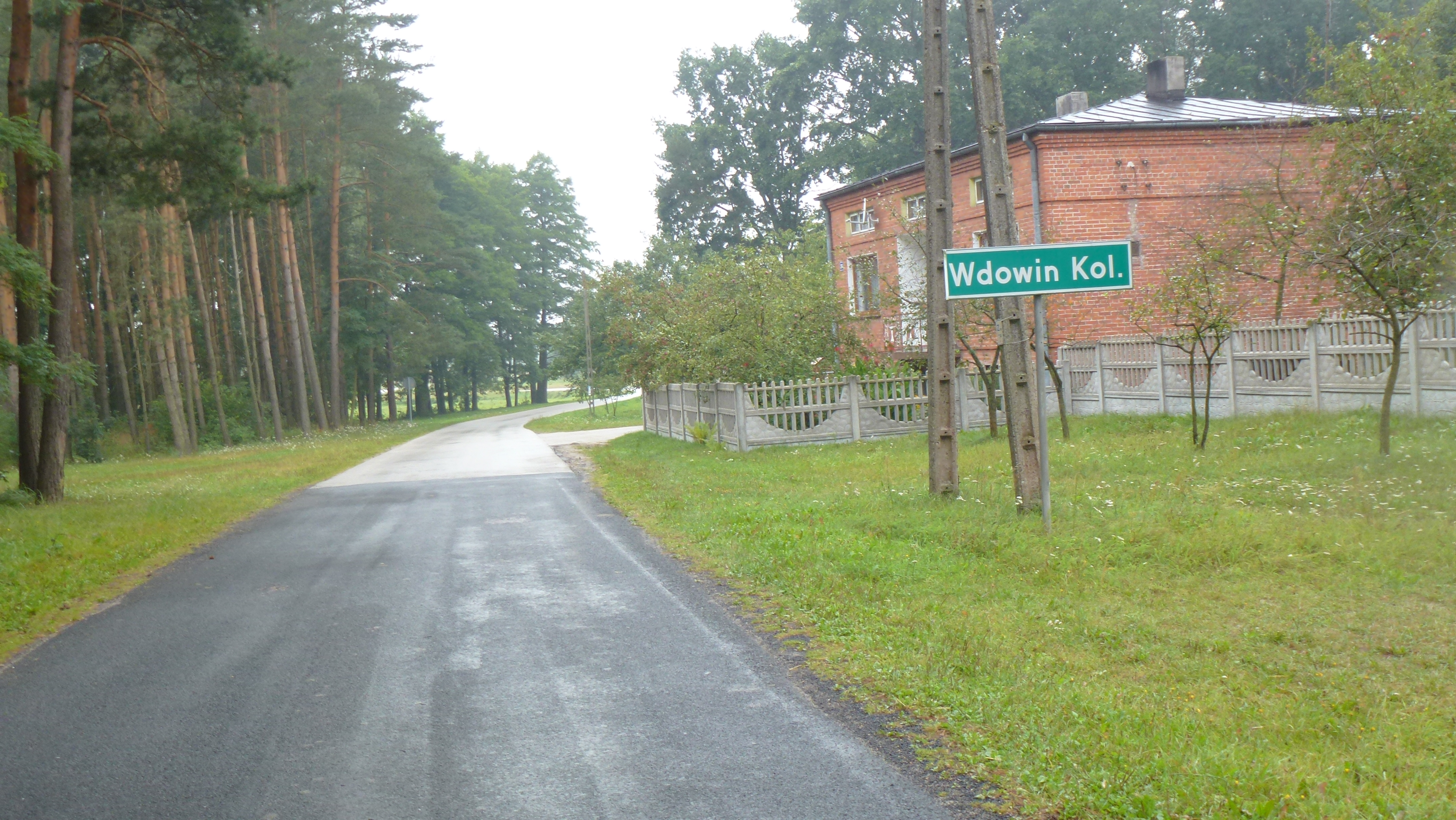

- Location within Poland
- Coordinates: 51°26′54″N 19°27′1″E
- Country: Poland
- Voivodeship: Łódź
- County: Bełchatów
- Gmina: Drużbice

Wdowin-Kolonia [ˈvdɔvin kɔˈlɔɲa] is a village in the administrative district of Gmina Drużbice, within Bełchatów County, Łódź Voivodeship, in central Poland.
