= Kobyłki, Łódź Voivodeship =

Kobyłki
- Village
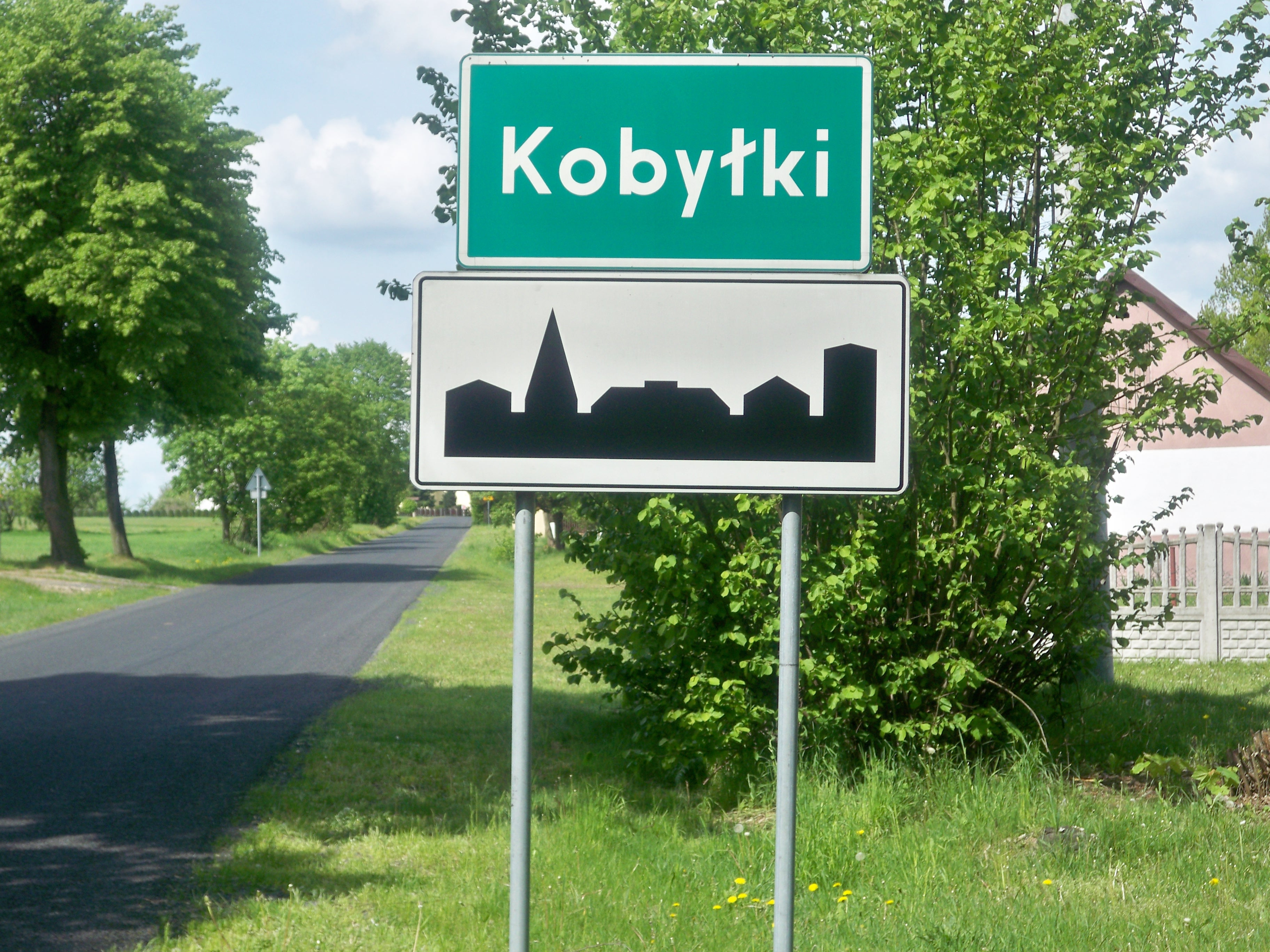

- Location within Poland
- Coordinates: 51°27′18″N 19°24′27″E
- Country: Poland
- Voivodeship: Łódź
- County: Bełchatów
- Gmina: Drużbice

Kobyłki [kɔˈbɨu̯ki] is a village in the administrative district of Gmina Drużbice, within Bełchatów County, Łódź Voivodeship, in central Poland.
