= Głupice-Parcela =

Village in Gmina Drużbice, Poland

- Village
- Location within Poland
- Coordinates: 51°28′22″N 19°22′09″E
- Country: Poland
- Voivodeship: Łódź
- County: Bełchatów
- Gmina: Drużbice

Głupice-Parcela [ɡwuˈpit͡sɛ parˈt͡sɛla] is a village in the administrative district of Gmina Drużbice, within Bełchatów County, Łódź Voivodeship, in central Poland.
