= Kazimierzów, Bełchatów County =

Kazimierzów
- Village
- Location within Poland
- Coordinates: 51°26′39″N 19°24′11″E
- Country: Poland
- Voivodeship: Łódź
- County: Bełchatów
- Gmina: Drużbice

Kazimierzów [kaʑiˈmjɛʐuf] is a village in the administrative district of Gmina Drużbice, within Bełchatów County, Łódź Voivodeship, in central Poland.
