= Rożniatowice =

- Village
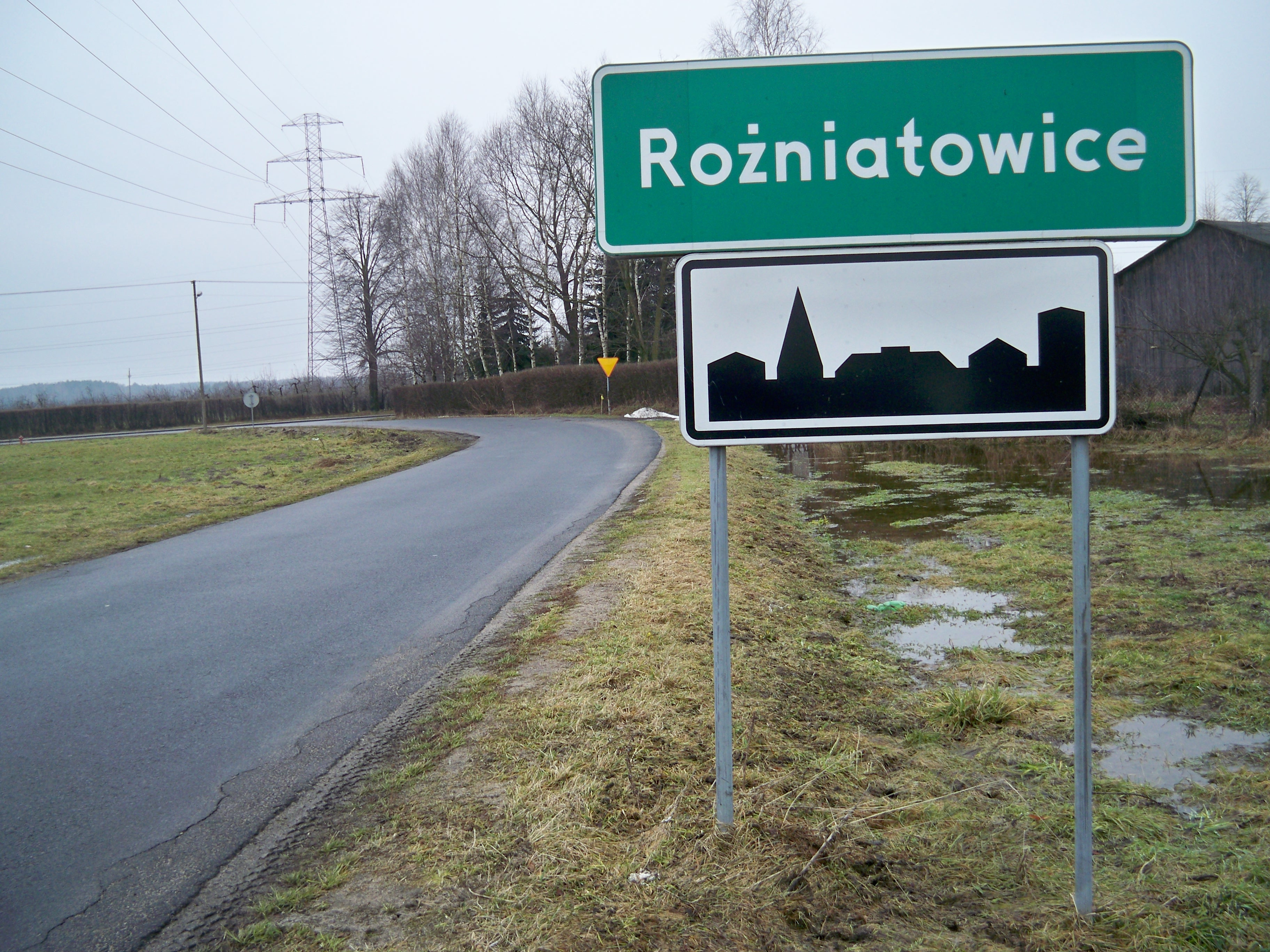

- Location within Poland
- Coordinates: 51°26′N 19°20′E
- Country: Poland
- Voivodeship: Łódź
- County: Bełchatów
- Gmina: Drużbice

Rożniatowice (Polish: [rɔʐ.ɲa.tɔˈvi.t͡sɛ]), also known as Różniatowice (Polish: [ruʐ.ɲa.tɔˈvi.t͡sɛ]) is a village in the administrative district of Gmina Drużbice, within Bełchatów County, Łódź Voivodeship, in central Poland.
