= Kącik, Łódź Voivodeship =

Kącik
- Village
- Location within Poland
- Coordinates: 51°25′42″N 19°23′33″E
- Country: Poland
- Voivodeship: Łódź
- County: Bełchatów
- Gmina: Drużbice
- Population: 80

Kącik [ˈkɔnt͡ɕik] is a village in the administrative district of Gmina Drużbice, within Bełchatów County, Łódź Voivodeship, in central Poland.
