= Skrajne =

- Village
- Location within Poland
- Coordinates: 51°30′N 19°22′E
- Country: Poland
- Voivodeship: Łódź
- County: Bełchatów
- Gmina: Drużbice

Skrajne [ˈskrai̯nɛ] is a village in the administrative district of Gmina Drużbice, within Bełchatów County, Łódź Voivodeship, in central Poland.
