= Ivan Ravich =

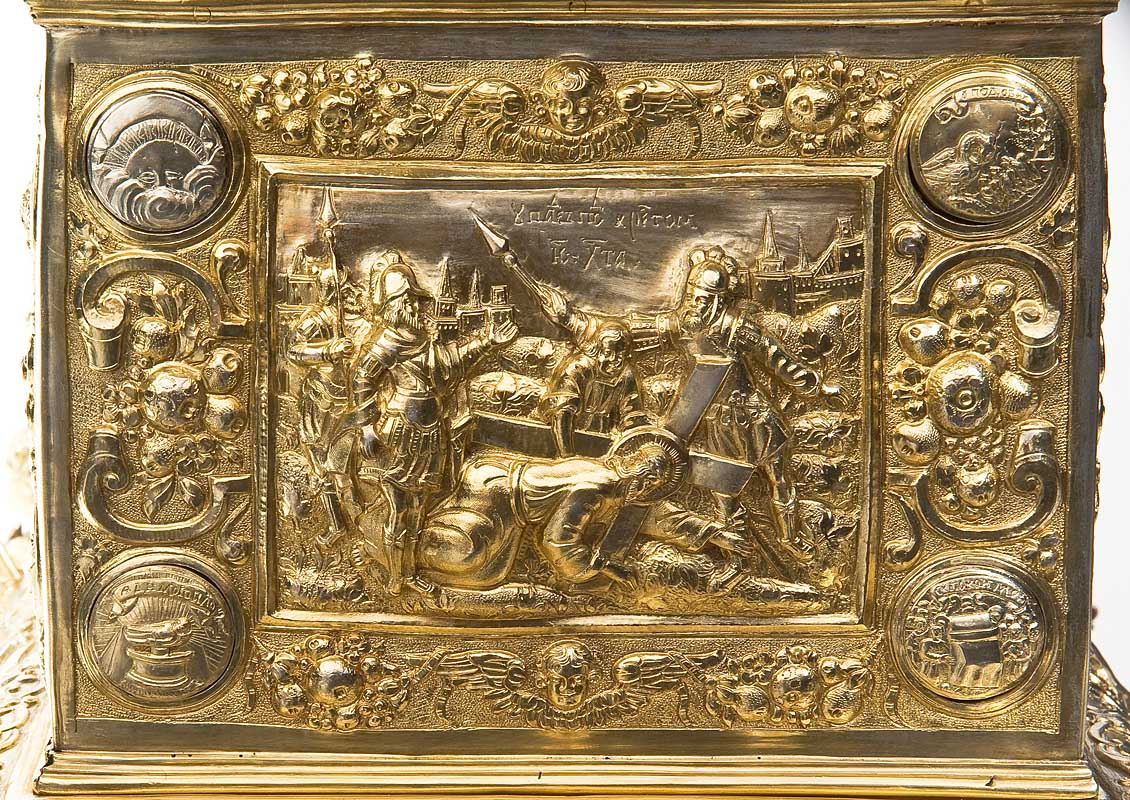
И. Равич. «Несение креста». Фрагмент дарохранительницы. 1743 г.

Ivan Andriiovych Ravych (Ukrainian: Іван Андрійович Равич; c. 1677 in Kyiv – 1762) was a jeweller and is considered a foundational figure in the development of the Baroque style in Ukrainian jewellery art. Active during the late 17th and early 18th centuries, Ravych played a significant role in shaping the visual culture of ecclesiastical and decorative metalwork in the Hetmanate period.

== Biography ==
=== Early life and education ===
Little is known about the early years of Ivan Ravych. He was born around 1677 in Kyiv, during a time when the city remained a prominent religious and cultural centre of the Cossack Hetmanate. His formative years coincided with a flourishing of the Kyiv-Mohyla Academy and a revival of Ukrainian Orthodox church patronage, both of which created favourable conditions for the development of sacred art and metalwork.

While no formal record of his artistic training survives, Ravych was likely apprenticed in a local workshop or monastery atelier, where he would have acquired expertise in the techniques of repoussé, chasing, filigree, and enamel—all of which became characteristic of his later work.

=== Artistic career ===
Ravych's career developed at a time when Ukrainian Baroque was emerging as a distinct artistic language, blending Byzantine, Western European, and local folk traditions. He became known for his work in precious metals, primarily gold and silver, producing ecclesiastical objects such as panagias, pectoral crosses, chalices, censers, and icon frames. His workshop attracted commissions from prominent religious institutions, including the Kyiv Pechersk Lavra and other monastic and episcopal centres throughout Left-Bank Ukraine.

Ravych's hallmark was the integration of dynamic floral ornamentation and complex architectural compositions, echoing the stylistic motifs of Ukrainian Baroque architecture. His craftsmanship reflected a high level of technical sophistication and a refined sense of design, often incorporating miniatures, inscriptions, and liturgical symbolism into his pieces.

=== Style and influence ===
Ivan Ravych is regarded as a pioneer in establishing the Ukrainian Baroque idiom in jewellery and religious metalwork. While Western European Baroque art was often monumental and theatrical, Ravych adapted its vocabulary to smaller-scale objects, translating the grandeur of Baroque forms into intimate, devotional artefacts. His work reflects both the aesthetic ideals of the Cossack elite and the spiritual needs of the Orthodox faithful.

He is credited with elevating Ukrainian jewellery-making to a new level of artistic expression, blending ornamental richness with theological narrative. Through his influence, Baroque motifs became standard across Ukrainian liturgical metalwork well into the late 18th century.

=== Legacy ===
Ivan Ravych's contributions to Ukrainian art have received growing scholarly attention, particularly in studies of early modern ecclesiastical art and decorative metalwork in Eastern Europe. Although few of his signed works survive, his influence is evident in the stylistic continuity of Ukrainian religious ornamentation across generations of artisans.

Some pieces attributed to Ravych and his workshop are held in museum collections in Kyiv and Chernihiv, including the National Museum of the History of Ukraine and the National Kyiv-Pechersk Historical and Cultural Reserve. His legacy persists not only in surviving artefacts but also in the visual vocabulary of Ukrainian ecclesiastical art.

=== Selected works ===
Due to the historical loss of records and wartime destruction, the specific catalogue of Ravych's works remains incomplete. Nonetheless, scholars have attributed several pieces to his hand or workshop, including:

- Silver panagia for the Metropolitan of Kyiv (c. 1730)
- Gilded icon frame for the Dormition Cathedral, Kyiv Pechersk Lavra (fragmentary, attributed)
- Processional cross, attributed (private collection, provenance Kyiv, mid-18th century)
