= Teresin, Bełchatów County =

Teresin
- Village
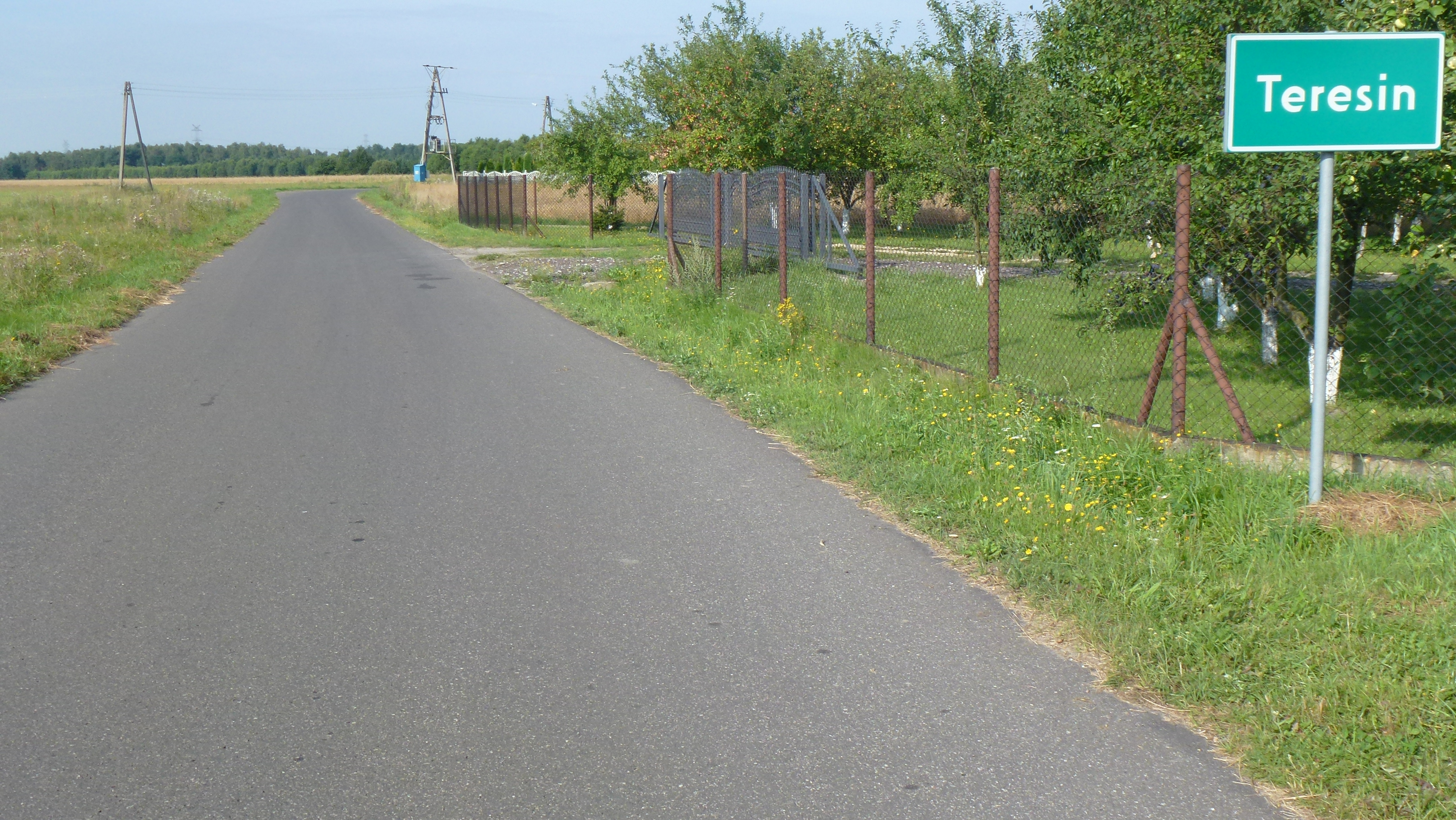

- Location within Poland
- Coordinates: 51°25′39″N 19°20′46″E
- Country: Poland
- Voivodeship: Łódź
- County: Bełchatów
- Gmina: Drużbice

Teresin (Polish pronunciation: [tɛˈrɛɕin]) is a village in the administrative district of Gmina Drużbice, within Bełchatów County, Łódź Voivodeship, in central Poland.
