= Rawicz (surname) =

Rawicz is a Polish-language noble surname of the Rawicz coat of arms. Russian language equivalent: Ravich.

Notable people with the surname include:

- Emma Rawicz, London-based jazz musician
- Marjan Rawicz, of Polish piano duo, Rawicz and Landauer
- Józef Warszewicz Ritter von Rawicz (1812–1866), Polish botanist
- Sławomir Rawicz (1915–2004), a Polish Gulag escapee, the author of Long Walk
- Wladyslaw Tomasz Rawicz-Ostrowski (1790–1869), Polish nobleman and military commander
