= Rawicz, Łódź Voivodeship =

Rawicz
- Village
- Location within Poland
- Coordinates: 51°28′N 19°25′E
- Country: Poland
- Voivodeship: Łódź
- County: Bełchatów
- Gmina: Drużbice

Rawicz (Polish pronunciation: [ˈravit͡ʂ]) is a village in the administrative district of Gmina Drużbice, within Bełchatów County, Łódź Voivodeship, in central Poland.
