= Stoki, Łódź Voivodeship =

Stokil
- Village
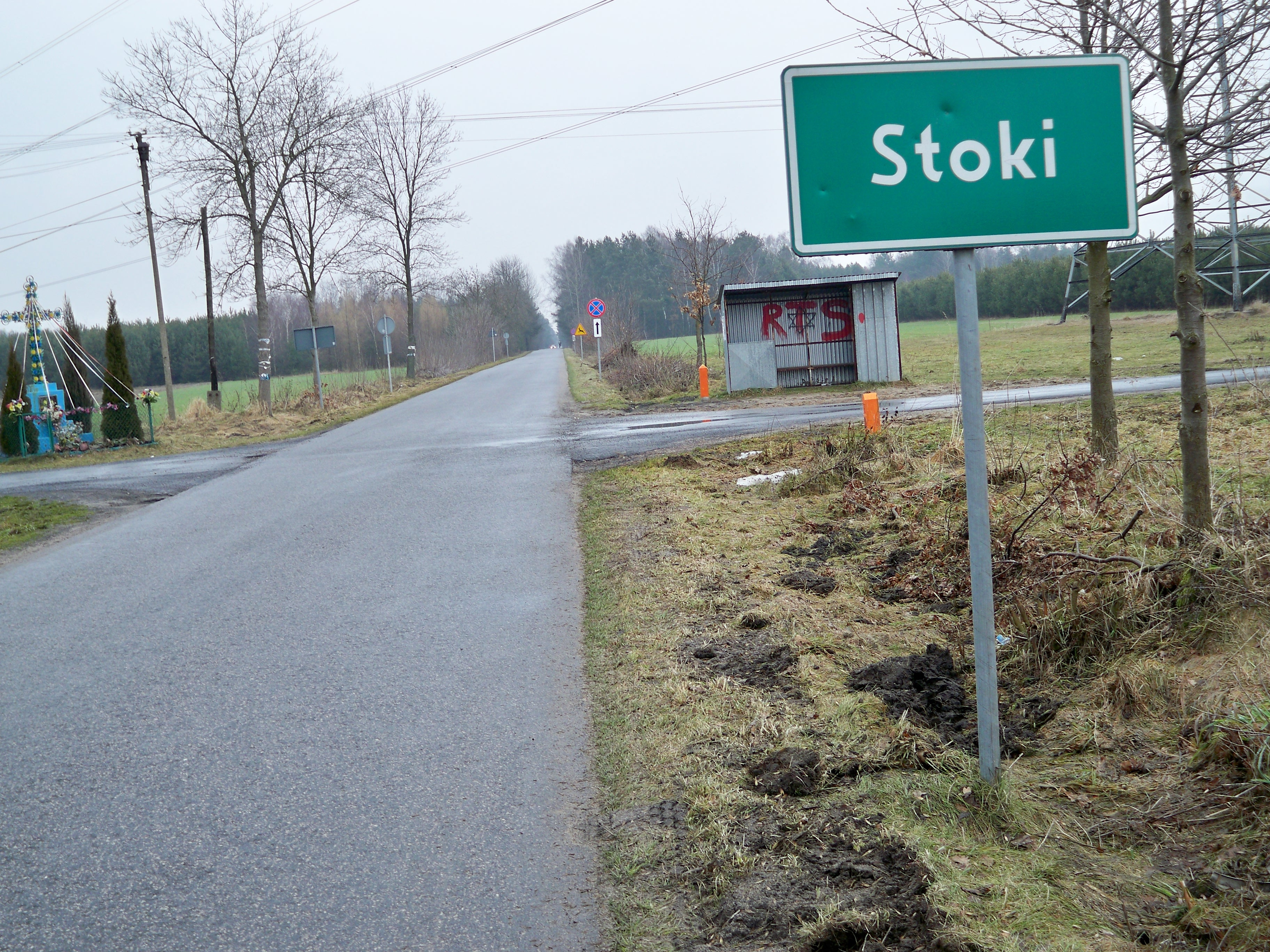

- Location within Poland
- Coordinates: 51°26′45″N 19°20′58″E
- Country: Poland
- Voivodeship: Łódź
- County: Bełchatów
- Gmina: Drużbice

Stoki [ˈstɔki] is a village in the administrative district of Gmina Drużbice, within Bełchatów County, Łódź Voivodeship, in central Poland.

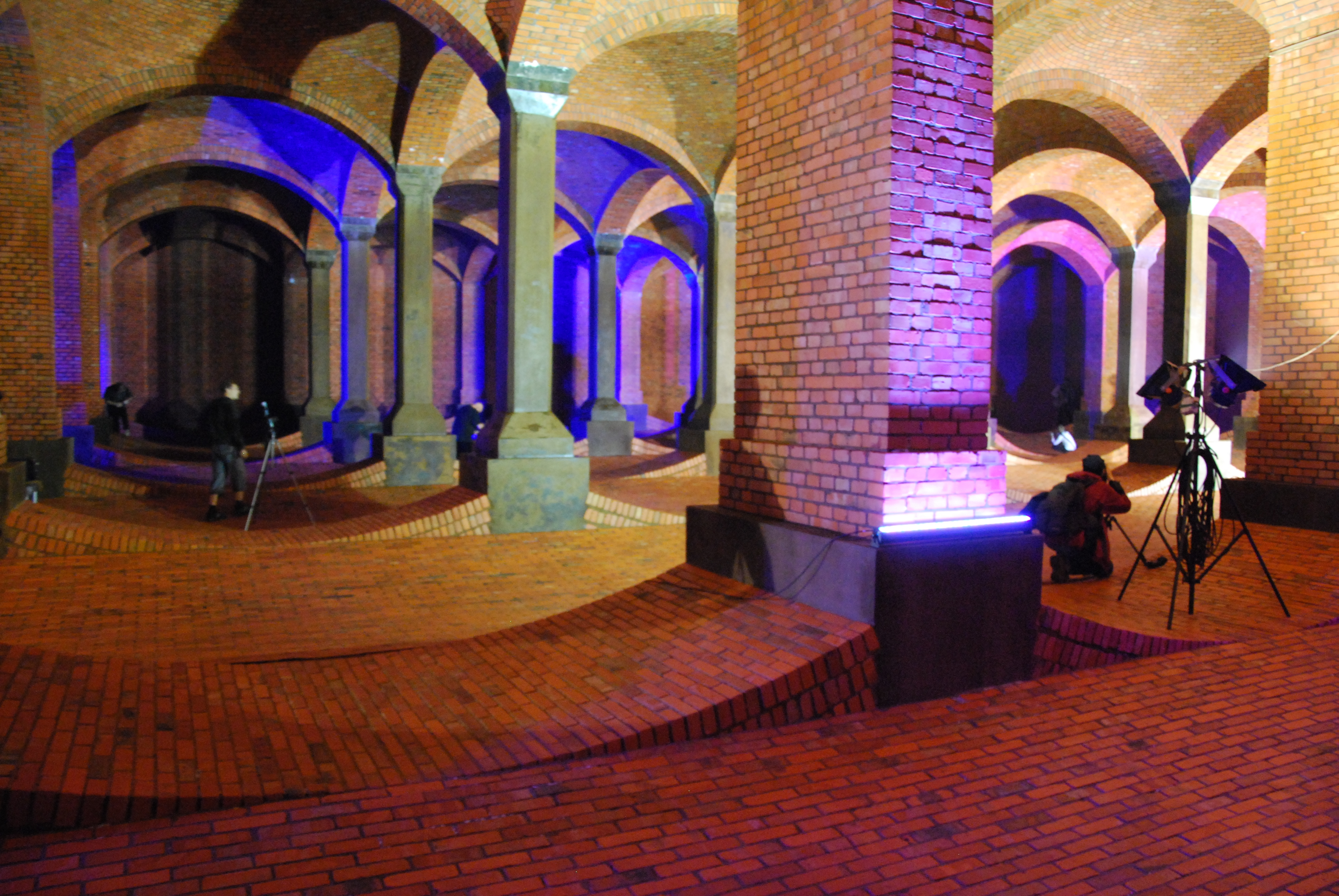
Underground water tank in Stoki

One of Stoki most unusual attractions is a historic underground water tank from the 1930s, sometimes referred to as the Underground Cathedral. The reservoir was designed by English engineer William Heerlein Lindley in the 1930s and was completed after World War II. Its first two structures were commissioned between 1935 and 1937.
