= Gręboszów, Łódź Voivodeship =

Gręboszów
- Village
- Location within Poland
- Coordinates: 51°27′56″N 19°24′42″E
- Country: Poland
- Voivodeship: Łódź
- County: Bełchatów
- Gmina: Drużbice

Gręboszów [ɡrɛmˈbɔʂuf] is a village in the administrative district of Gmina Drużbice, within Bełchatów County, Łódź Voivodeship, in central Poland.
