= Hucisko, Bełchatów County =

Hucisko
- Village
- Location within Poland
- Coordinates: 51°26′8″N 19°28′4″E
- Country: Poland
- Voivodeship: Łódź
- County: Bełchatów
- Gmina: Drużbice

Hucisko [xuˈt͡ɕiskɔ] is a village in the administrative district of Gmina Drużbice, within Bełchatów County, Łódź Voivodeship, in central Poland.
