= Wrzosy, Łódź Voivodeship =

Wrzosy
- Village
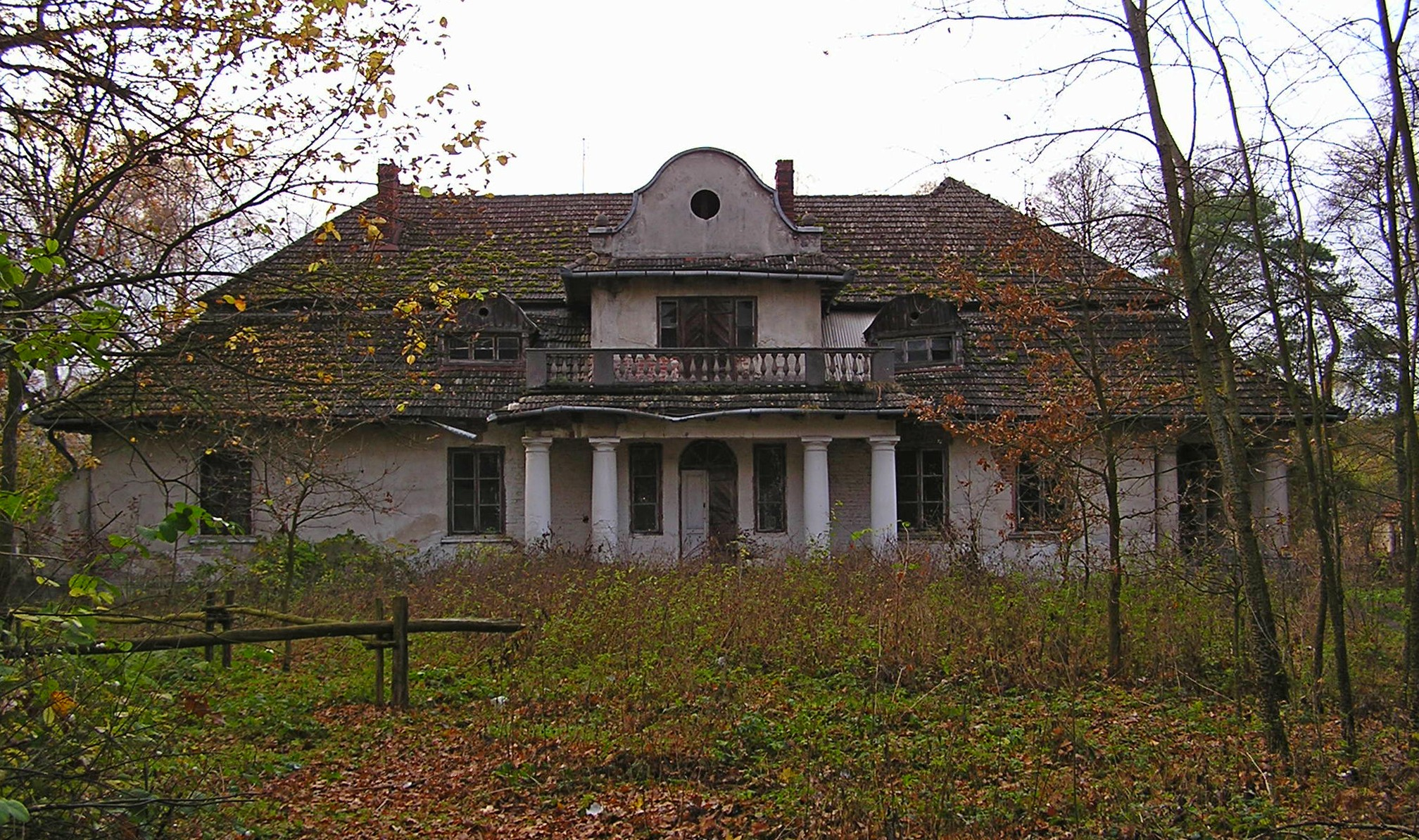

- Location within Poland
- Coordinates: 51°24′28″N 19°24′55″E
- Country: Poland
- Voivodeship: Łódź
- County: Bełchatów
- Gmina: Drużbice

Wrzosy [ˈvʐɔsɨ] is a village in the administrative district of Gmina Drużbice, within Bełchatów County, Łódź Voivodeship, in central Poland.
