= Kostrzyna =

Kostrzyna may refer to the following places in Poland:

- Kostrzyna, Lower Silesian Voivodeship (south-west Poland)
- Kostrzyna, Gmina Panki in Silesian Voivodeship (south Poland)
- Kostrzyna, Gmina Przystajń in Silesian Voivodeship (south Poland)
