= Płaczki =

Płaczki may refer to the following places:

- Płaczki, Greater Poland Voivodeship (west-central Poland)
- Płaczki, Łódź Voivodeship (central Poland)
- Płaczki, Silesian Voivodeship (south Poland)
