= Kołaczkowice, Silesian Voivodeship =

Kołaczkowice
- Village
- Location within Poland
- Coordinates: 50°57′N 18°57′E
- Country: Poland
- Voivodeship: Silesian
- County: Kłobuck
- Gmina: Miedźno
- Population: 609

Kołaczkowice [kɔwat͡ʂkɔˈvit͡sɛ] is a village in the administrative district of Gmina Miedźno, within Kłobuck County, Silesian Voivodeship, in southern Poland.
