= Antonie, Silesian Voivodeship =

Antonie
- Village
- Location within Poland
- Coordinates: 51°5′10″N 18°56′53″E
- Country: Poland
- Voivodeship: Silesian
- County: Kłobuck
- Gmina: Popów
- Population: 76

Antonie [anˈtɔɲɛ] is a village in the administrative district of Gmina Popów, within Kłobuck County, Silesian Voivodeship, in southern Poland.
