= Annolesie, Silesian Voivodeship =

Annolesie
- Village
- Location within Poland
- Coordinates: 51°3′27″N 18°56′40″E
- Country: Poland
- Voivodeship: Silesian
- County: Kłobuck
- Gmina: Popów
- Population: 175

Annolesie [annɔˈlɛɕɛ] is a village in the administrative district of Gmina Popów, within Kłobuck County, Silesian Voivodeship, in southern Poland.
