= Dankowice Trzecie =

- Village
- Location within Poland
- Coordinates: 50°55′45″N 18°41′18″E
- Country: Poland
- Voivodeship: Silesian
- County: Kłobuck
- Gmina: Krzepice
- Population: 183

Dankowice Trzecie [dankɔˈvit͡sɛ ˈtʂɛt͡ɕɛ] is a village in the administrative district of Gmina Krzepice, within Kłobuck County, Silesian Voivodeship, in southern Poland.
