= Siekierowizna =

- Village
- Location within Poland
- Coordinates: 50°51′N 18°39′E
- Country: Poland
- Voivodeship: Silesian
- County: Kłobuck
- Gmina: Przystajń
- Population: 109

Siekierowizna [ɕɛkʲɛrɔˈvizna] is a village in the administrative district of Gmina Przystajń, within Kłobuck County, Silesian Voivodeship, in southern Poland. From 1975 to 1998, the locality administratively belonged to the Częstochowa province.
