= Stany, Silesian Voivodeship =

Stany
- Village
- Location within Poland
- Coordinates: 50°51′N 18°37′E
- Country: Poland
- Voivodeship: Silesian
- County: Kłobuck
- Gmina: Przystajń
- Population: 173

Stany [ˈstanɨ] is a village in the administrative district of Gmina Przystajń, within Kłobuck County, Silesian Voivodeship, in southern Poland.
