= Górki, Kłobuck County =

Górki
- Village
- Location within Poland
- Coordinates: 50°51′N 18°38′E
- Country: Poland
- Voivodeship: Silesian
- County: Kłobuck
- Gmina: Przystajń
- Population: 226

Górki [ˈɡurki] is a village in the administrative district of Gmina Przystajń, within Kłobuck County, Silesian Voivodeship, in southern Poland.
