= Dąbrówka, Kłobuck County =

Dąbrówka
- Village
- Location within Poland
- Coordinates: 51°2′N 18°57′E
- Country: Poland
- Voivodeship: Silesian
- County: Kłobuck
- Gmina: Popów
- Population: 224

Dąbrówka [dɔmˈbrufka] is a village in the administrative district of Gmina Popów, within Kłobuck County, Silesian Voivodeship, in southern Poland.
