= Żerdzina =

- Village
- Location within Poland
- Coordinates: 50°52′N 18°45′E
- Country: Poland
- Voivodeship: Silesian
- County: Kłobuck
- Gmina: Panki
- Population: 159

Żerdzina [ʐɛrˈd͡ʑina] is a village in the administrative district of Gmina Panki, within Kłobuck County, Silesian Voivodeship, in southern Poland.
