= Popów-Parcela =

- Settlement
- Location within Poland
- Coordinates: 51°2′N 18°55′E
- Country: Poland
- Voivodeship: Silesian
- County: Kłobuck
- Gmina: Popów

Popów-Parcela [ˈpɔpuf parˈt͡sɛla] is a settlement in the administrative district of Gmina Popów, within Kłobuck County, Silesian Voivodeship, in southern Poland.
