= Brzezinki, Gmina Opatów =

Brzezinki
- Village
- Location within Poland
- Coordinates: 50°56′5″N 18°53′21″E
- Country: Poland
- Voivodeship: Silesian
- County: Kłobuck
- Gmina: Opatów
- Population: 99

Brzezinki [bʐɛˈʑinki] is a village in the administrative district of Gmina Opatów, within Kłobuck County, Silesian Voivodeship, in southern Poland.
