= Stara Kuźnica, Silesian Voivodeship =

Stara Kuźnica
- Village
- Location within Poland
- Coordinates: 50°53′N 18°42′E
- Country: Poland
- Voivodeship: Silesian
- County: Kłobuck
- Gmina: Przystajń
- Population: 461

Stara Kuźnica (Polish pronunciation: [ˈstara kuʑˈɲit͡sa]) is a village in the administrative district of Gmina Przystajń, within Kłobuck County, Silesian Voivodeship, in southern Poland.
