= Kule, Silesian Voivodeship =

Village in southern Poland

Kule
- Village
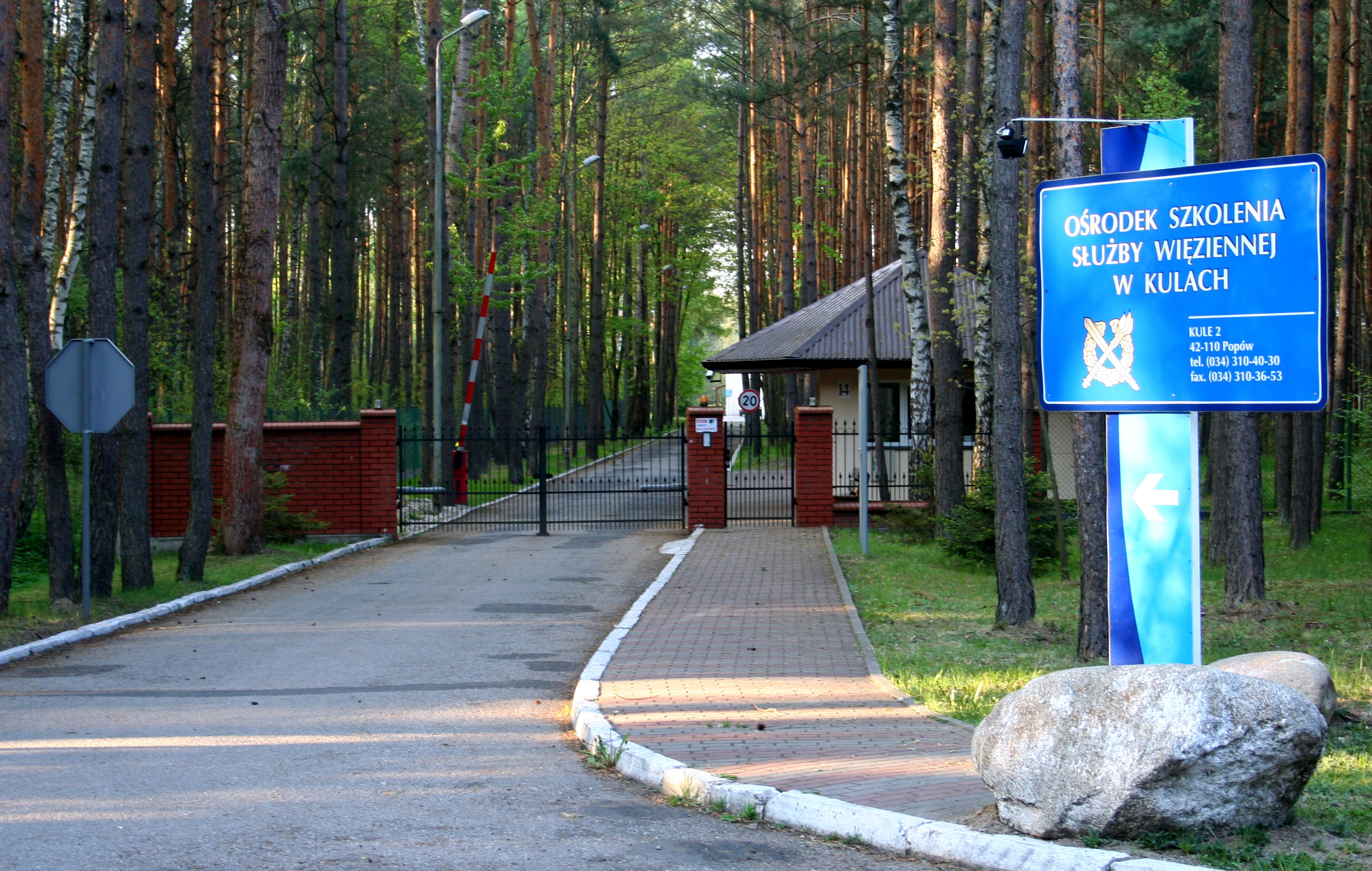

- Location within Poland
- Coordinates: 51°2′N 19°2′E
- Country: Poland
- Voivodeship: Silesian
- County: Kłobuck
- Gmina: Popów
- Population: 84

Kule [ˈkulɛ] is a village in the administrative district of Gmina Popów, within Kłobuck County, Silesian Voivodeship, in southern Poland.
