= Kluczno =

- Settlement
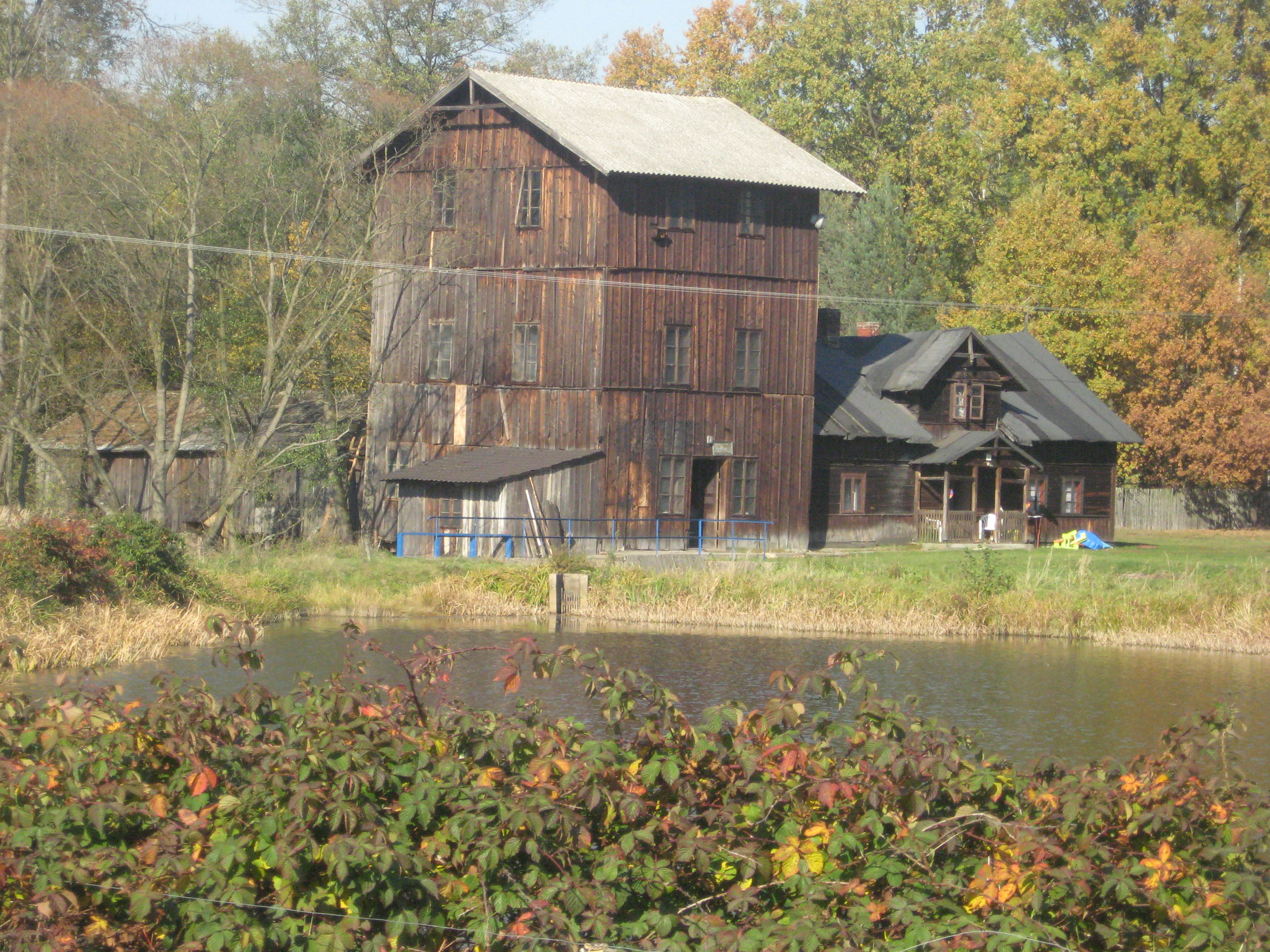

- Location within Poland
- Coordinates: 50°48′N 18°41′E
- Country: Poland
- Voivodeship: Silesian
- County: Kłobuck
- Gmina: Przystajń
- Population: 28

Kluczno [ˈklut͡ʂnɔ] is a settlement in the administrative district of Gmina Przystajń, within Kłobuck County, Silesian Voivodeship, in southern Poland.
