= Zajączki Drugie =

- Village
- Location within Poland
- Coordinates: 50°59′38″N 18°41′33″E
- Country: Poland
- Voivodeship: Silesian
- County: Kłobuck
- Gmina: Krzepice
- Population: 928

Zajączki Drugie [zaˈjɔnt͡ʂki ˈdruɡʲɛ] is a village in the administrative district of Gmina Krzepice, within Kłobuck County, Silesian Voivodeship, in southern Poland.
