= Aleksandrów, Kłobuck County =

Aleksandrów
- Village
- Location within Poland
- Coordinates: 50°55′N 18°43′E
- Country: Poland
- Voivodeship: Silesian
- County: Kłobuck
- Gmina: Panki
- Population: 136

Aleksandrów [alɛkˈsandruf] is a village in the administrative district of Gmina Panki, within Kłobuck County, Silesian Voivodeship, in southern Poland.
