= Kałmuki =

- Village
- Location within Poland
- Coordinates: 50°53′N 18°48′E
- Country: Poland
- Voivodeship: Silesian
- County: Kłobuck
- Gmina: Panki
- Population: 254

Kałmuki [kau̯ˈmuki] is a village in the administrative district of Gmina Panki, within Kłobuck County, Silesian Voivodeship, in southern Poland. Its population is around 254.
