= Władysławów, Silesian Voivodeship =

Władysławów
- Village
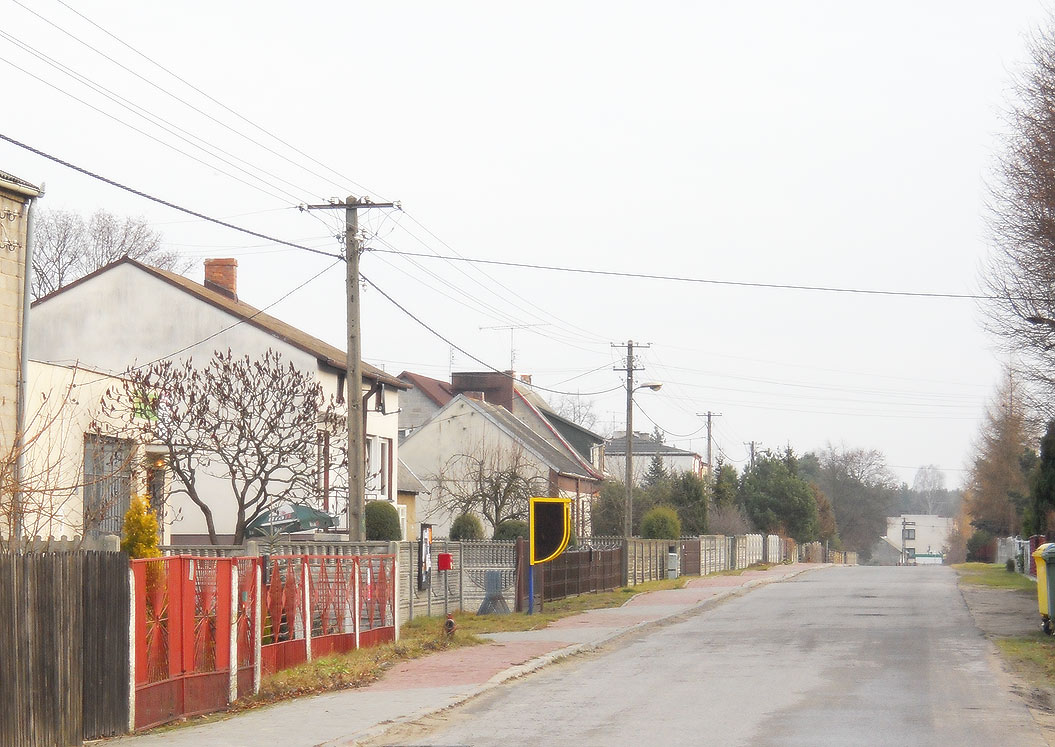

- Location within Poland
- Coordinates: 51°1′N 18°59′E
- Country: Poland
- Voivodeship: Silesian
- County: Kłobuck
- Gmina: Miedźno
- Population: 345

Władysławów [vwadɨˈswavuf] is a village in the administrative district of Gmina Miedźno, within Kłobuck County, Silesian Voivodeship, in southern Poland.
