= Iwanowice Małe =

- Village
- Location within Poland
- Coordinates: 50°57′N 18°47′E
- Country: Poland
- Voivodeship: Silesian
- County: Kłobuck
- Gmina: Opatów
- Population: 467

Iwanowice Małe [ivanɔˈvit͡sɛ ˈmawɛ] is a village in the administrative district of Gmina Opatów, within Kłobuck County, Silesian Voivodeship, in southern Poland.
