= Galińskie =

- Settlement
- Location within Poland
- Coordinates: 50°52′N 18°38′E
- Country: Poland
- Voivodeship: Silesian
- County: Kłobuck
- Gmina: Przystajń

Galińskie (Polish pronunciation: [ɡaˈlij̃skʲɛ]) is a settlement in the administrative district of Gmina Przystajń, within Kłobuck County, Silesian Voivodeship, in southern Poland.
