= Mrówczak =

- Village
- Location within Poland
- Coordinates: 50°54′N 18°40′E
- Country: Poland
- Voivodeship: Silesian
- County: Kłobuck
- Gmina: Przystajń
- Population: 174

Mrówczak [ˈmruft͡ʂak] is a village in the administrative district of Gmina Przystajń, within Kłobuck County, Silesian Voivodeship, in southern Poland.
