= Pacanów, Silesian Voivodeship =

Pacanów
- Village
- Location within Poland
- Coordinates: 50°54′24″N 18°43′14″E
- Country: Poland
- Voivodeship: Silesian
- County: Kłobuck
- Gmina: Panki
- Population: 147

Pacanów [paˈt͡sanuf] is a village in the administrative district of Gmina Panki, within Kłobuck County, Silesian Voivodeship, in southern Poland.
