= Praszczyki =

- Village
- Location within Poland
- Coordinates: 50°52′53″N 18°46′47″E
- Country: Poland
- Voivodeship: Silesian
- County: Kłobuck
- Gmina: Panki
- Population: 573

Praszczyki [praʂˈt͡ʂɨki] is a village in the administrative district of Gmina Panki, within Kłobuck County, Silesian Voivodeship, in southern Poland.
