= Lelity =

- Village
- Location within Poland
- Coordinates: 51°5′N 18°55′E
- Country: Poland
- Voivodeship: Silesian
- County: Kłobuck
- Gmina: Popów
- Population: 71

Lelity [lɛˈlitɨ] is a village in the administrative district of Gmina Popów, within Kłobuck County, Silesian Voivodeship, in southern Poland.
