= Złochowice =

- Village
- Location within Poland
- Coordinates: 50°55′N 18°49′E
- Country: Poland
- Voivodeship: Silesian
- County: Kłobuck
- Gmina: Opatów
- Population: 1,283

Złochowice [zwɔxɔˈvit͡sɛ] is a village in the administrative district of Gmina Opatów, within Kłobuck County, Silesian Voivodeship, in southern Poland.

== History ==
Złochowice was a former royal property in the Krzepice starosty, in Lelów County, belonging to the parish in Kłobuck. According to an inspection from 1564, there were 8 peasants on half-lanes in the village. As part of their duties, they transported nets to the fields during hunting. The innkeeper on the farm paid from the tavern and the land he possessed. 7 peasants paid in honey. In 1787, 312 people lived in Złochowice, including 7 Jews. The inspection of Lelów County from 1789 showed: 70 farms, 61 houses (a brewery and 60 cottages), and 315 inhabitants (148 women). In 1781, the village had 65 houses and 320 inhabitants (including 154 women). There was an iron more operating in the town during this time.

From 1975 to 1998, the locality administratively belonged to the Częstochowa Voivodeship.
