= Nowa Kuźnica, Kłobuck County =

Nowa Kuźnica
- Village
- Location within Poland
- Coordinates: 50°52′N 18°38′E
- Country: Poland
- Voivodeship: Silesian
- County: Kłobuck
- Gmina: Przystajń
- Population: 111

Nowa Kuźnica (Polish pronunciation: [ˈnɔva kuʑˈɲit͡sa]) is a village in the administrative district of Gmina Przystajń, within Kłobuck County, Silesian Voivodeship, in southern Poland.
