= Dankowice Pierwsze =

- Village
- Location within Poland
- Coordinates: 50°56′18″N 18°42′45″E
- Country: Poland
- Voivodeship: Silesian
- County: Kłobuck
- Gmina: Krzepice
- Population: 351

Dankowice Pierwsze [dankɔˈvit͡sɛ ˈpjɛrfʂɛ] is a village in the administrative district of Gmina Krzepice, within Kłobuck County, Silesian Voivodeship, in southern Poland.
