= Starokrzepice =

- Village
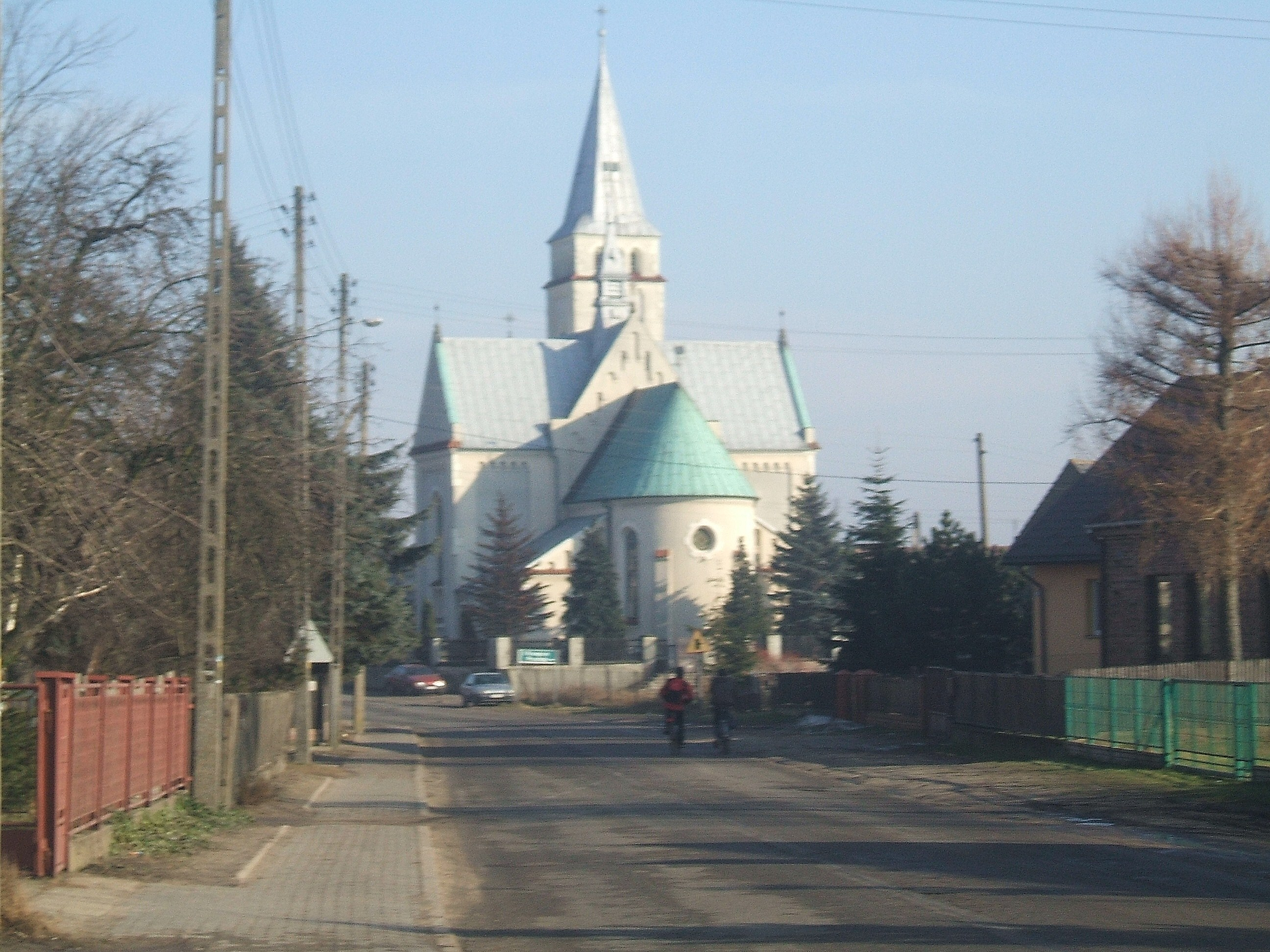
- Church of the Transfiguration of Christ

- Location within Poland
- Coordinates: 50°56′N 18°39′E
- Country: Poland
- Voivodeship: Silesian
- County: Kłobuck
- Gmina: Krzepice

Population
  - Total: 1,319

Starokrzepice [starɔkʂɛˈpit͡sɛ] is a village in the administrative district of Gmina Krzepice, within Kłobuck County, Silesian Voivodeship, in southern Poland. The village lies on the Liswarta river.

Currently in Starokrzepice there are about 10 streets. The main street is Oleska, which traverses the entire village. Other streets may be counted as a settlement.

Starokrzepice has a volunteer fire brigade (OSP), Health Centre and Post Office. There is also a Youth Brass Band conducted by the OSP and Slawomir Krysia majorette team. In addition, it has many production, retail and service companies and shops.
