= Wąsosz Górny =

- Village
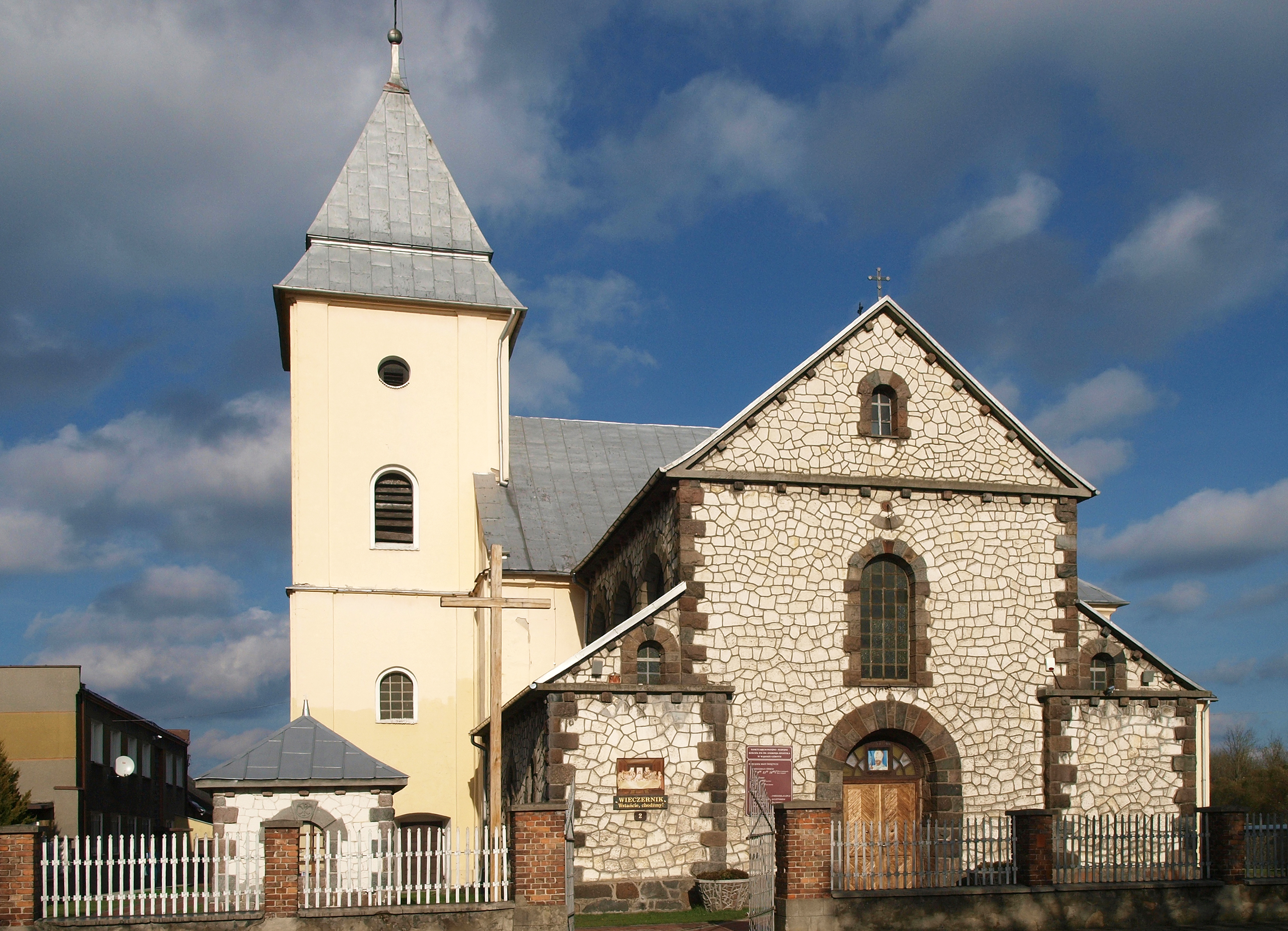
- Church of Saint Andrew

- Location within Poland
- Coordinates: 51°3′N 19°0′E
- Country: Poland
- Voivodeship: Silesian
- County: Kłobuck
- Gmina: Popów

Population
  - Total: 454

Wąsosz Górny [ˈvɔ̃sɔʂ ˈɡurnɨ] is a village in the administrative district of Gmina Popów, within Kłobuck County, Silesian Voivodeship, in southern Poland.
