= Zajączki Pierwsze =

- Village
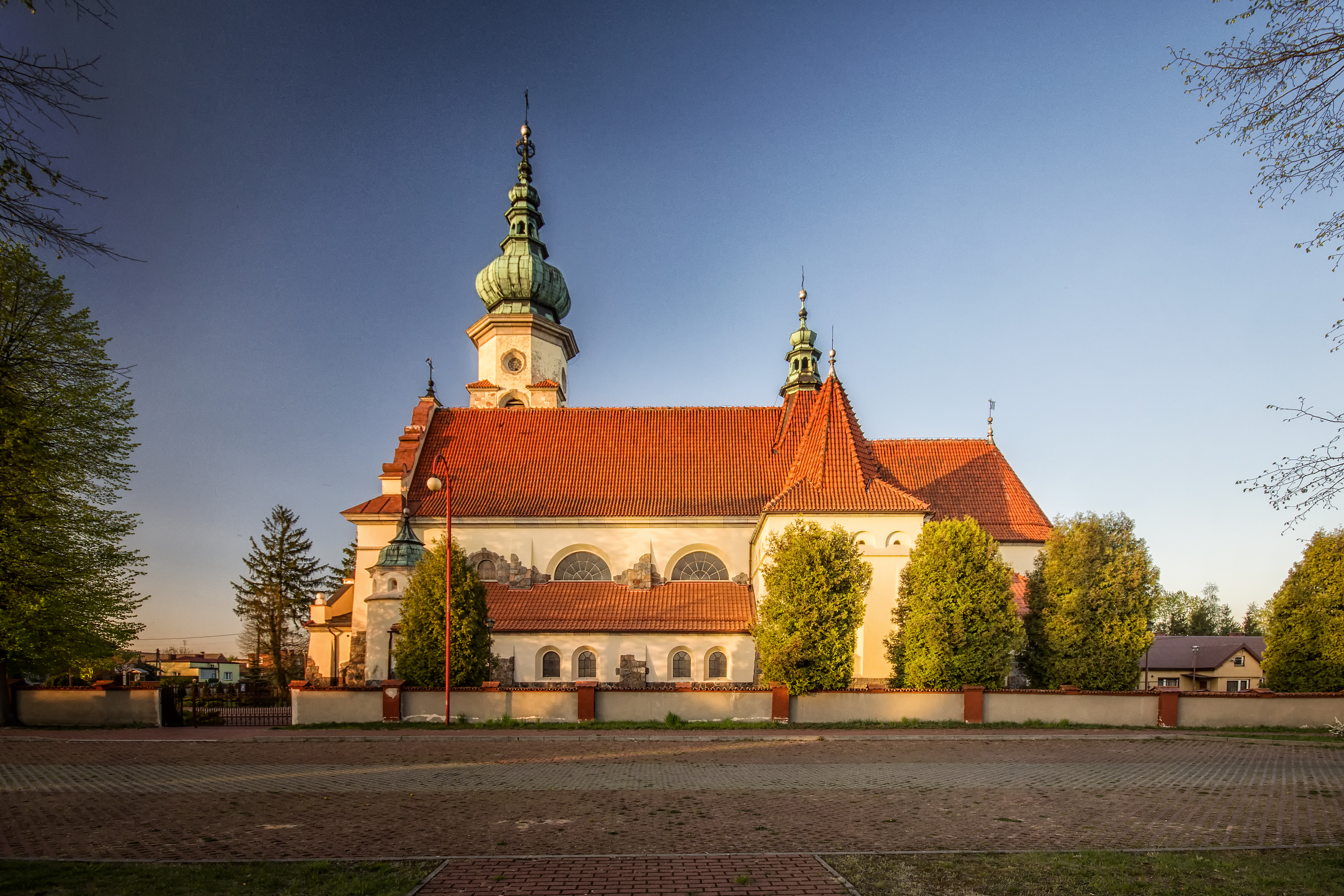
- Catholic church

- Location within Poland
- Coordinates: 51°0′0″N 18°43′18″E
- Country: Poland
- Voivodeship: Silesian
- County: Kłobuck
- Gmina: Krzepice
- Population: 922

Zajączki Pierwsze [zaˈjɔnt͡ʂki ˈpjɛrfʂɛ] is a village in the administrative district of Gmina Krzepice, within Kłobuck County, Silesian Voivodeship, in southern Poland.
