= Bagna, Silesian Voivodeship =

Bagna
- Village
- Location within Poland
- Coordinates: 50°52′23″N 18°42′46″E
- Country: Poland
- Voivodeship: Silesian
- County: Kłobuck
- Gmina: Przystajń
- Population: 57

Bagna [ˈbaɡna] is a village in the administrative district of Gmina Przystajń, within Kłobuck County, Silesian Voivodeship, in southern Poland.
