= Iwanowice Duże =

- Village
- Location within Poland
- Coordinates: 50°58′N 18°48′E
- Country: Poland
- Voivodeship: Silesian
- County: Kłobuck
- Gmina: Opatów
- Population: 995

Iwanowice Duże [ivanɔˈvit͡sɛ ˈduʐɛ] is a village in the administrative district of Gmina Opatów, within Kłobuck County, Silesian Voivodeship, in southern Poland.
