= Waleńczów =

- Village
- Location within Poland
- Coordinates: 50°55′37″N 18°51′58″E
- Country: Poland
- Voivodeship: Silesian
- County: Kłobuck
- Gmina: Opatów
- Population: 1,112

Waleńczów [vaˈlɛɲt͡ʂuf] is a village in the administrative district of Gmina Opatów, within Kłobuck County, Silesian Voivodeship, in southern Poland.
