= Rybaki =

Rybaki may refer to the following places:

- Rybaki, Gmina Dobrzyniewo Duże in Podlaskie Voivodeship (north-east Poland)
- Rybaki, Gmina Michałowo in Podlaskie Voivodeship (north-east Poland)
- Rybaki, Hajnówka County in Podlaskie Voivodeship (north-east Poland)
- Rybaki, Łomża County in Podlaskie Voivodeship (north-east Poland)
- Rybaki, Mońki County in Podlaskie Voivodeship (north-east Poland)
- Rybaki, Łódź Voivodeship (central Poland)
- Rybaki, Gmina Wilków in Opole County, Lublin Voivodeship (east Poland)
- Rybaki, Ryki County in Lublin Voivodeship (east Poland)
- Rybaki, Masovian Voivodeship (east-central Poland)
- Rybaki, Lubusz Voivodeship (west Poland)
- Rybaki, Kartuzy County in Pomeranian Voivodeship (north Poland)
- Rybaki, Tczew County in Pomeranian Voivodeship (north Poland)
- Rybaki, Elbląg County in Warmian-Masurian Voivodeship (north Poland)
- Rybaki, Olsztyn County in Warmian-Masurian Voivodeship (north Poland)
- Rybaki, Ostróda County in Warmian-Masurian Voivodeship (north Poland)
- Rybaki, West Pomeranian Voivodeship (north-west Poland)
- Polish name for Primorsk, Kaliningrad Oblast
