= Brzeziny, Kłobuck County =

Brzeziny
- Village
- Location within Poland
- Coordinates: 50°51′N 18°41′E
- Country: Poland
- Voivodeship: Silesian
- County: Kłobuck
- Gmina: Przystajń
- Population: 332

Brzeziny [bʐɛˈʑinɨ] is a village in the administrative district of Gmina Przystajń, within Kłobuck County, Silesian Voivodeship, in southern Poland.
