= Zwierzyniec Pierwszy =

- Village
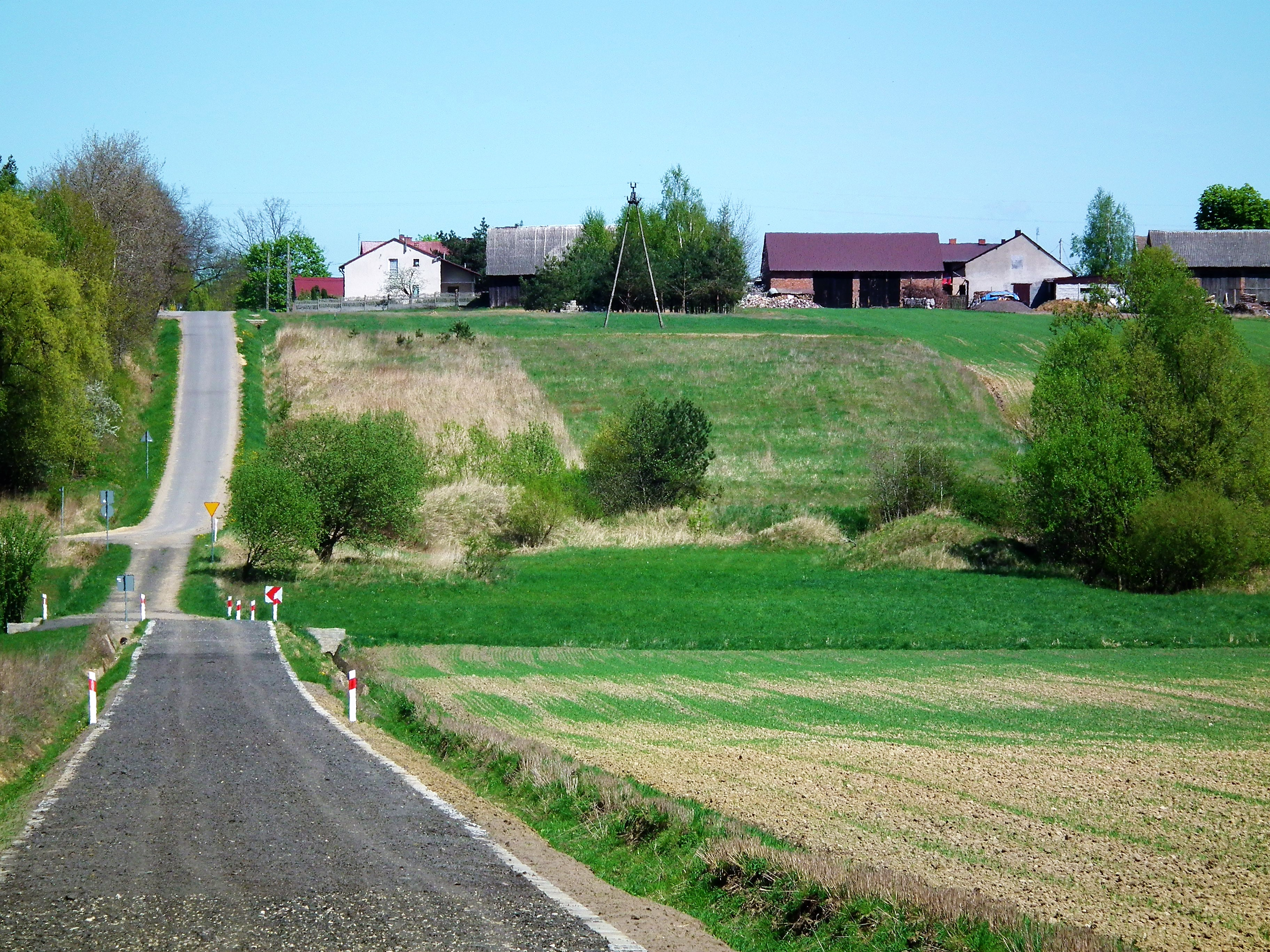

- Location within Poland
- Coordinates: 50°56′N 18°45′E
- Country: Poland
- Voivodeship: Silesian
- County: Kłobuck
- Gmina: Opatów
- Population: 435

Zwierzyniec Pierwszy (Polish pronunciation: [zvjɛˈʐɨɲɛt͡s ˈpjɛrfʂɨ]) is a village in the administrative district of Gmina Opatów, within Kłobuck County, Silesian Voivodeship, in southern Poland.
