= Kamińsko, Silesian Voivodeship =

Kamińsko
- Village
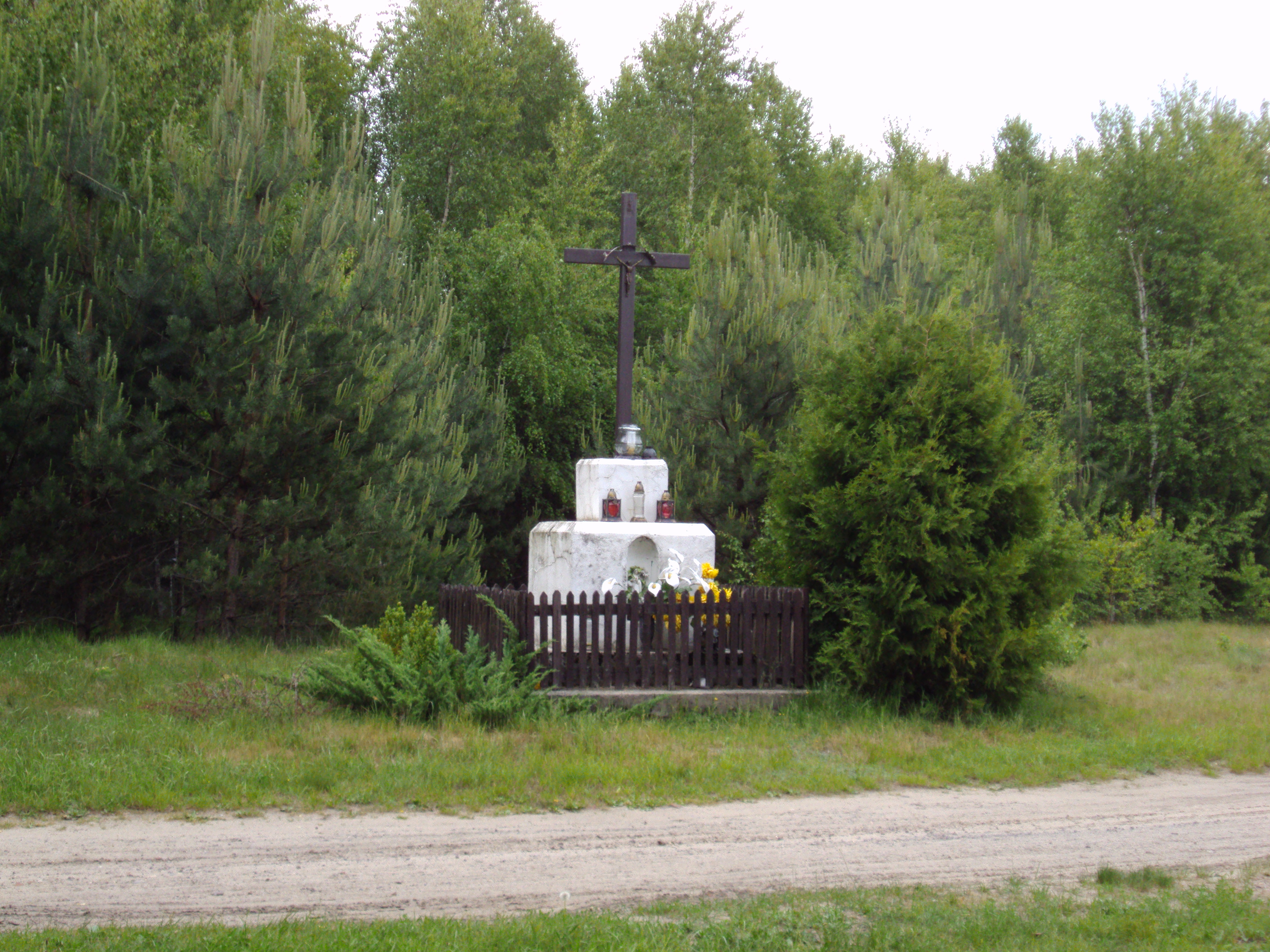
- Roadside shrine

- Location within Poland
- Coordinates: 50°47′N 18°44′E
- Country: Poland
- Voivodeship: Silesian
- County: Kłobuck
- Gmina: Przystajń
- Population: 148

Kamińsko [kaˈmiɲskɔ] is a village in the administrative district of Gmina Przystajń, within Kłobuck County, Silesian Voivodeship, in southern Poland.
