= Gmina Opatów =

Gmina Opatów may refer to either of the following administrative districts in Poland:

- Gmina Opatów, Silesian Voivodeship
- Gmina Opatów, Świętokrzyskie Voivodeship
