= Mazówki =

- Village
- Location within Poland
- Coordinates: 50°59′N 19°3′E
- Country: Poland
- Voivodeship: Silesian
- County: Kłobuck
- Gmina: Miedźno
- Population: 96

Mazówki [maˈzufki] is a village in the administrative district of Gmina Miedźno, within Kłobuck County, Silesian Voivodeship, in southern Poland.
