= Borowa, Silesian Voivodeship =

Borowa
- Village
- Location within Poland
- Coordinates: 51°0′29″N 19°0′51″E
- Country: Poland
- Voivodeship: Silesian
- County: Kłobuck
- Gmina: Miedźno
- Population: 471

Borowa [bɔˈrɔva] is a village in the administrative district of Gmina Miedźno, within Kłobuck County, Silesian Voivodeship, in southern Poland.
