= Antonów =

- Village
- Location within Poland
- Coordinates: 50°52′57″N 18°39′56″E
- Country: Poland
- Voivodeship: Silesian
- County: Kłobuck
- Gmina: Przystajń
- Population: 173

Antonów (Polish pronunciation: [anˈtɔnuf]) is a village in the administrative district of Gmina Przystajń, within Kłobuck County, Silesian Voivodeship, in southern Poland.
