= Iwanowice-Naboków =

- Village
- Location within Poland
- Coordinates: 50°57′29″N 18°48′2″E
- Country: Poland
- Voivodeship: Silesian
- County: Kłobuck
- Gmina: Opatów
- Population: 131

Iwanowice-Naboków [ivanɔˈvit͡sɛ naˈbɔkuf] is a village in the administrative district of Gmina Opatów, within Kłobuck County, Silesian Voivodeship, in southern Poland.
