= Zwierzyniec Trzeci =

- Village
- Location within Poland
- Coordinates: 50°54′34″N 18°45′46″E
- Country: Poland
- Voivodeship: Silesian
- County: Kłobuck
- Gmina: Panki
- Population: 315

Zwierzyniec Trzeci (Polish pronunciation: [zvjɛˈʐɨɲɛt͡s ˈtʂɛt͡ɕi]) is a village in the administrative district of Gmina Panki, within Kłobuck County, Silesian Voivodeship, in southern Poland.
