= Kamieńszczyzna, Silesian Voivodeship =

Kamieńszczyzna
- Village
- Location within Poland
- Coordinates: 51°0′N 18°53′E
- Country: Poland
- Voivodeship: Silesian
- County: Kłobuck
- Gmina: Popów
- Population: 197

Kamieńszczyzna [kamjɛɲʂˈt͡ʂɨzna] is a village in the administrative district of Gmina Popów, within Kłobuck County, Silesian Voivodeship, in southern Poland.
