= Wierzba =

Wierzba may refer to:

- Wierzba, Łódź Voivodeship
- Wierzba, Warmian-Masurian Voivodeship, a village in the Gmina Ruciane-Nida

== See also ==
- MPP-B Wierzba mine, a fibreglass Polish minimum metal anti-tank blast mine
