= Wilcza Góra, Silesian Voivodeship =

Wilcza Góra
- Village
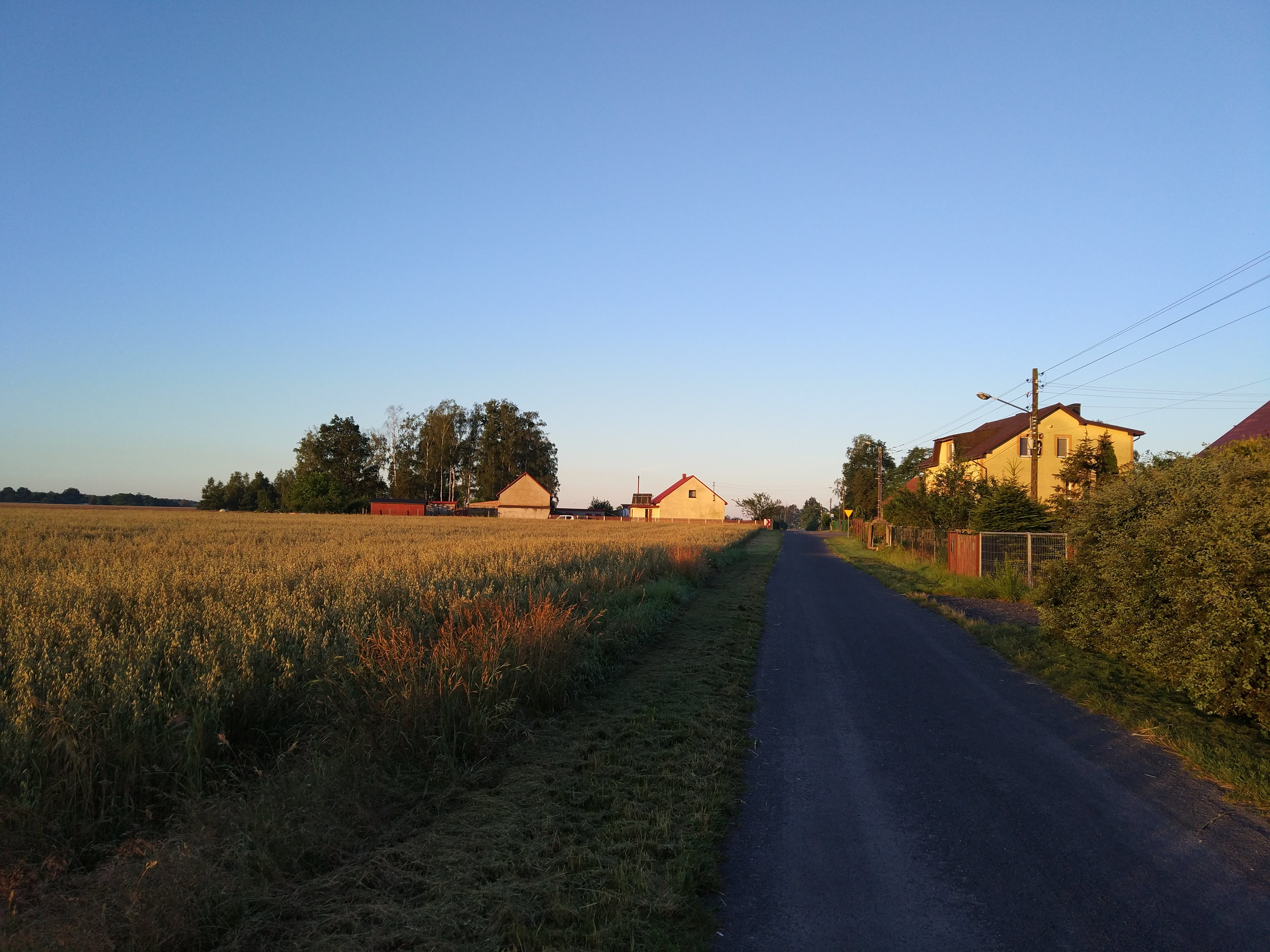
- Wilcza Góra sunrise in 2020

- Location within Poland
- Coordinates: 50°51′N 18°42′E
- Country: Poland
- Voivodeship: Silesian
- County: Kłobuck
- Gmina: Przystajń
- Population: 96

Wilcza Góra [ˈvilt͡ʂa ˈɡura] is a village in the administrative district of Gmina Przystajń, within Kłobuck County, Silesian Voivodeship, in southern Poland.
