= Dąbrowa, Gmina Przystajń =

Dąbrowa
- Village
- Location within Poland
- Coordinates: 50°50′N 18°41′E
- Country: Poland
- Voivodeship: Silesian
- County: Kłobuck
- Gmina: Przystajń
- Population: 117

Dąbrowa [dɔmˈbrɔva] is a village in the administrative district of Gmina Przystajń, within Kłobuck County, Silesian Voivodeship, in southern Poland.
