= Węzina, Silesian Voivodeship =

Węzina
- Settlement
- Location within Poland
- Coordinates: 50°51′N 18°38′E
- Country: Poland
- Voivodeship: Silesian
- County: Kłobuck
- Gmina: Przystajń
- Population: 46

Węzina [vɛ̃ˈʑina] is a settlement in the administrative district of Gmina Przystajń, within Kłobuck County, Silesian Voivodeship, in southern Poland.
