= Rębielice Królewskie =

- Village
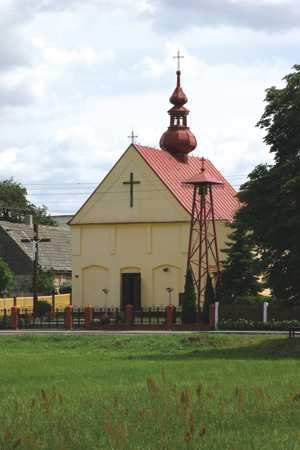
- Catholic church

- Location within Poland
- Coordinates: 51°0′0″N 18°52′0″E
- Country: Poland
- Voivodeship: Silesian
- County: Kłobuck
- Gmina: Popów
- Population: 848

Rębielice Królewskie [rɛmbjɛˈlit͡sɛ kruˈlɛfskʲɛ] is a village in the administrative district of Gmina Popów, within Kłobuck County, Silesian Voivodeship, in southern Poland.

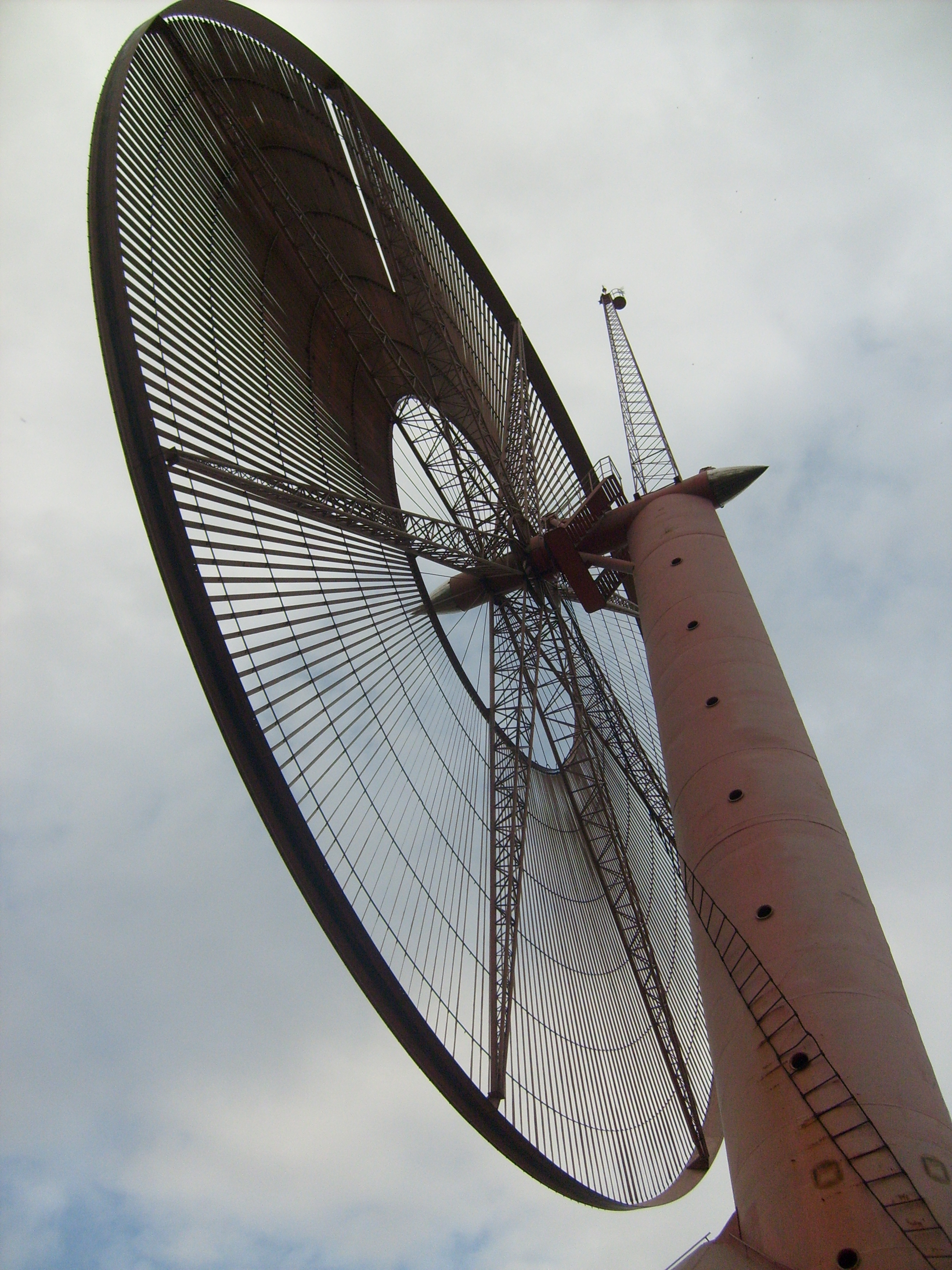
Wind turbine in Rebielice Krolewskie.

== Points of interest ==
- Rębielice Królewskie Wind Turbine
