= Brzózki, Gmina Popów =

Brzózki
- Village
- Location within Poland
- Coordinates: 51°1′44″N 18°58′53″E
- Country: Poland
- Voivodeship: Silesian
- County: Kłobuck
- Gmina: Popów
- Population: 211

Brzózki [ˈbʐuski] is a village in the administrative district of Gmina Popów, within Kłobuck County, Silesian Voivodeship, in southern Poland.
