= Rywaczki =

- Village
- Location within Poland
- Coordinates: 50°58′58″N 19°4′37″E
- Country: Poland
- Voivodeship: Silesian
- County: Kłobuck
- Gmina: Miedźno
- Population: 103

Rywaczki [rɨˈvat͡ʂki] is a village in the administrative district of Gmina Miedźno, within Kłobuck County, Silesian Voivodeship, in southern Poland.
