= Dankowice Drugie =

- Village
- Location within Poland
- Coordinates: 50°57′7″N 18°41′46″E
- Country: Poland
- Voivodeship: Silesian
- County: Kłobuck
- Gmina: Krzepice
- Population: 255

Dankowice Drugie [dankɔˈvit͡sɛ ˈdruɡʲɛ] is a village in the administrative district of Gmina Krzepice, within Kłobuck County, Silesian Voivodeship, in southern Poland.
