= Bór Zajaciński =

- Village
- Location within Poland
- Coordinates: 50°50′N 18°39′E
- Country: Poland
- Voivodeship: Silesian
- County: Kłobuck
- Gmina: Przystajń
- Population: 284

Bór Zajaciński (Polish pronunciation: [ˈbur zajaˈt͡ɕij̃skʲi]) is a village in the administrative district of Gmina Przystajń, within Kłobuck County, Silesian Voivodeship, in southern Poland.
