= Kawki, Silesian Voivodeship =

Kawki
- Village
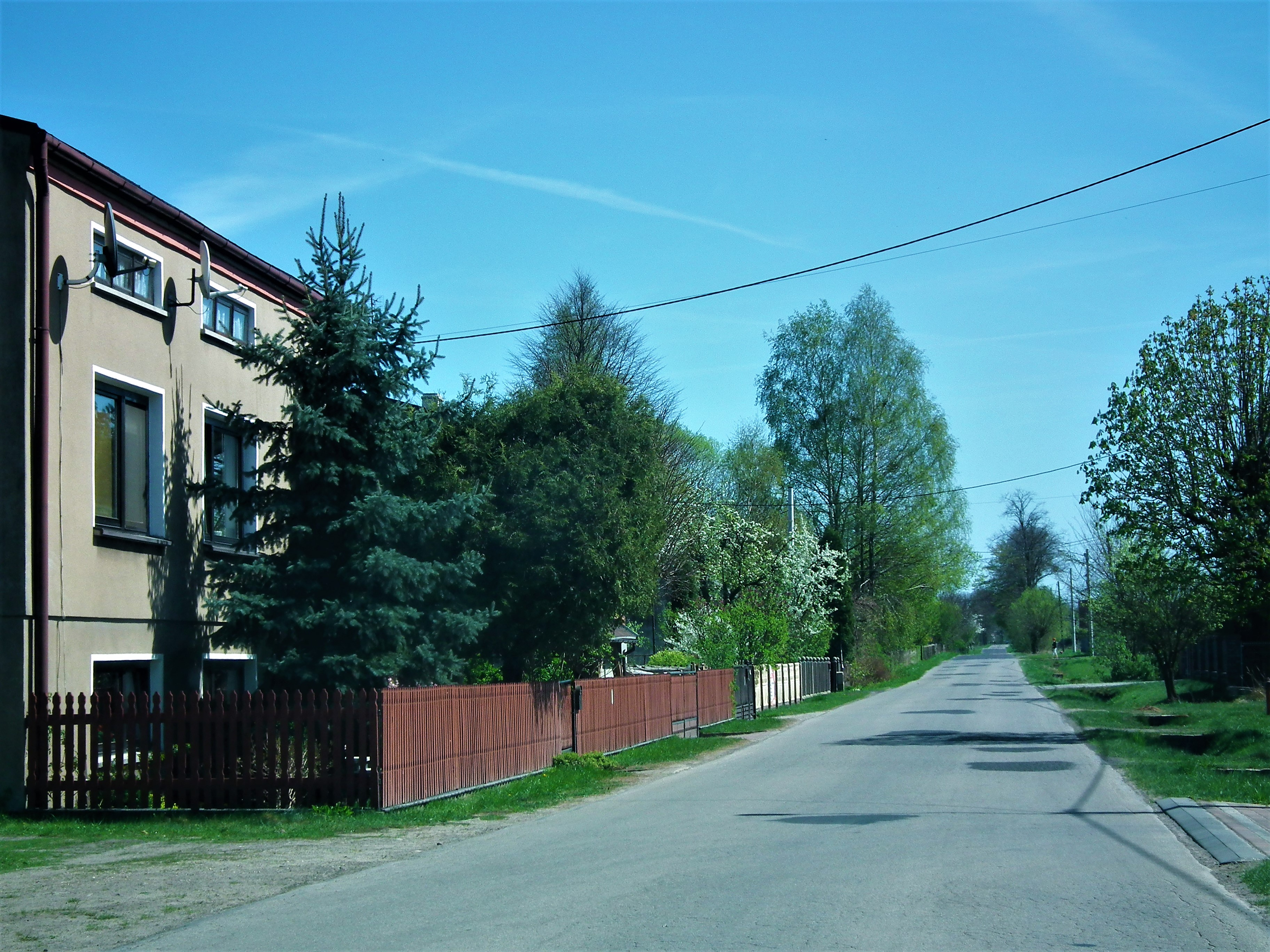

- Location within Poland
- Coordinates: 50°52′N 18°46′E
- Country: Poland
- Voivodeship: Silesian
- County: Kłobuck
- Gmina: Panki
- Population: 211

Kawki [ˈkafki] is a village in the administrative district of Gmina Panki, within Kłobuck County, Silesian Voivodeship, in southern Poland.
