= Izbiska, Silesian Voivodeship =

Izbiska
- Village
- Location within Poland
- Coordinates: 50°59′N 18°57′E
- Country: Poland
- Voivodeship: Silesian
- County: Kłobuck
- Gmina: Miedźno
- Population: 325

Izbiska [izˈbiska] is a village in the administrative district of Gmina Miedźno, within Kłobuck County, Silesian Voivodeship, in southern Poland.
