= Nowa Wieś, Gmina Popów =

Nowa Wieś
- Village
- Location within Poland
- Coordinates: 51°1′40″N 19°2′5″E
- Country: Poland
- Voivodeship: Silesian
- County: Kłobuck
- Gmina: Popów
- Population: 256

Nowa Wieś [ˈnɔva ˈvjɛɕ] is a village in the administrative district of Gmina Popów, within Kłobuck County, Silesian Voivodeship, in southern Poland.
