= Wapiennik, Gmina Miedźno =

Wapiennik
- Village
- Location within Poland
- Coordinates: 50°58′N 18°56′E
- Country: Poland
- Voivodeship: Silesian
- County: Kłobuck
- Gmina: Miedźno
- Population: 294

Wapiennik [vaˈpjɛnnik] is a village in the administrative district of Gmina Miedźno, within Kłobuck County, Silesian Voivodeship, in southern Poland.
