= Smolarze =

- Village
- Location within Poland
- Coordinates: 51°3′N 18°53′E
- Country: Poland
- Voivodeship: Silesian
- County: Kłobuck
- Gmina: Popów
- Population: 65

Smolarze [smɔˈlaʐɛ] is a village in the administrative district of Gmina Popów, within Kłobuck County, Silesian Voivodeship, in southern Poland.
