= Dankowice-Piaski =

- Village
- Location within Poland
- Coordinates: 50°56′27″N 18°40′4″E
- Country: Poland
- Voivodeship: Silesian
- County: Kłobuck
- Gmina: Krzepice
- Population: 197

Dankowice-Piaski (Polish pronunciation: [dankɔˈvitsɛ ˈpjaskʲi]) is a village in the administrative district of Gmina Krzepice, within Kłobuck County, Silesian Voivodeship, in southern Poland.
