= Wilkowiecko =

- Village
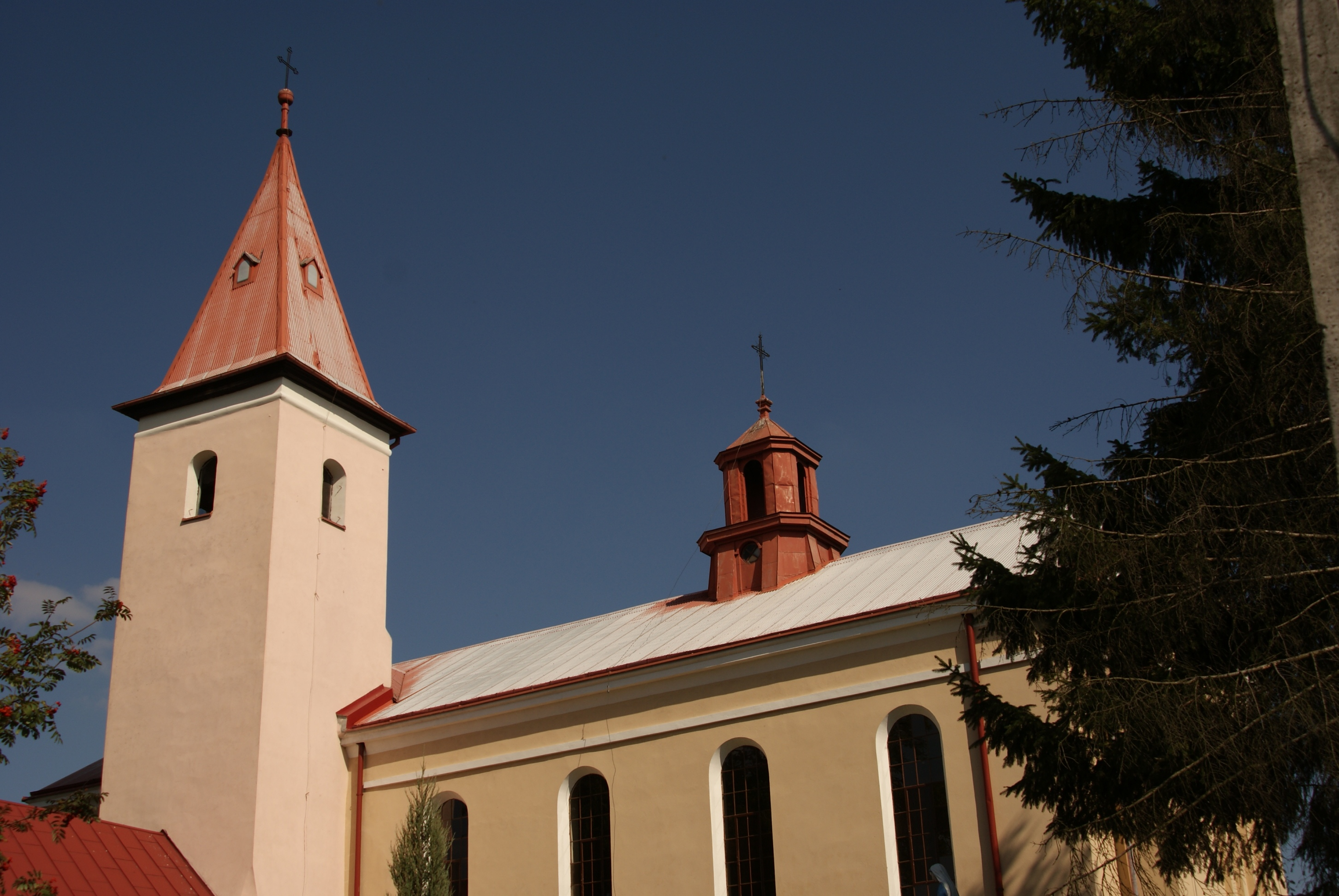
- Catholic church

- Location within Poland
- Coordinates: 50°57′N 18°51′E
- Country: Poland
- Voivodeship: Silesian
- County: Kłobuck
- Gmina: Opatów
- Population: 1,049

Wilkowiecko [vilkɔˈvjɛt͡skɔ] is a village in the administrative district of Gmina Opatów, within Kłobuck County, Silesian Voivodeship, in southern Poland.
