= Nowy Folwark, Silesian Voivodeship =

Nowy Folwark
- Village
- Location within Poland
- Coordinates: 51°1′N 19°5′E
- Country: Poland
- Voivodeship: Silesian
- County: Kłobuck
- Gmina: Miedźno
- Population: 23

Nowy Folwark [ˈnɔvɨ ˈfɔlvark] is a village in the administrative district of Gmina Miedźno, within Kłobuck County, Silesian Voivodeship, in southern Poland.
