= Gmina Przystajń =

Gmina Przystajń Przystajń Commune
- Gmina
- Coat of arms
- Interactive map of Gmina Przystajń
- Coordinates (Przystajń): 50°53′N 18°42′E
- Country: Poland
- Voivodeship: Silesian
- County: Kłobuck
- Seat: Przystajń

Area
  - Total: 88.85 km^{2} (34.31 sq mi)

Population (2019-06-30)
  - Total: 5,881
  - Density: 66.19/km^{2} (171.4/sq mi)
- Website: https://gminaprzystajn.pl/

Gmina Przystajń is a rural gmina (administrative district) in Kłobuck County, Silesian Voivodeship, in southern Poland. Its seat is the village of Przystajń, which lies approximately 17 kilometres (11 mi) west of Kłobuck and 74 km (46 mi) north of the regional capital Katowice.

The gmina covers an area of 88.85 square kilometres (34.3 sq mi), and as of 2019 its total population is 5,881.

The gmina contains part of the protected area called Upper Liswarta Forests Landscape Park.

== Villages ==
Gmina Przystajń contains the villages and settlements of Antonów, Bagna, Bór Zajaciński, Brzeziny, Dąbrowa, Galińskie, Górki, Kamińsko, Kluczno, Kostrzyna, Ługi-Radły, Michalinów, Mrówczak, Nowa Kuźnica, Podłęże Szlacheckie, Przystajń, Siekierowizna, Stany, Stara Kuźnica, Węzina, Wilcza Góra and Wrzosy.

== Neighbouring gminas ==
Gmina Przystajń is bordered by the gminas of Ciasna, Herby, Krzepice, Olesno, Panki and Wręczyca Wielka.
