= Kruplin-Barbarówka =

- Village
- Location within Poland
- Coordinates: 51°05′45″N 19°13′56″E
- Country: Poland
- Voivodeship: Łódź
- County: Pajęczno
- Gmina: Nowa Brzeźnica
- Population: 40

Kruplin-Barbarówka [ˈkruplin barbaˈrufka] is a village in the administrative district of Gmina Nowa Brzeźnica, within Pajęczno County, Łódź Voivodeship, in central Poland.
