= Rębielice Królewskie Wind Turbine =

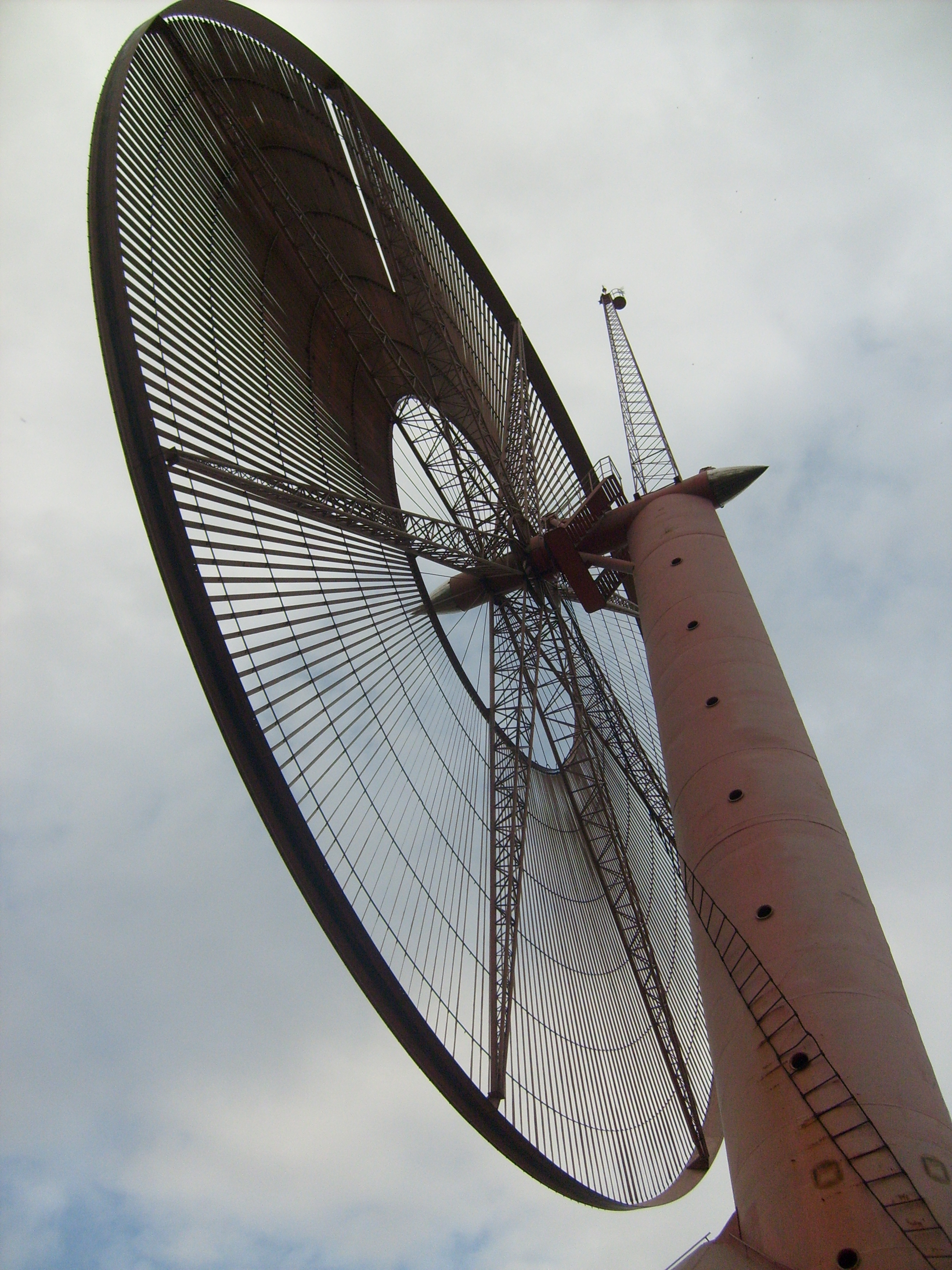
- Country: Poland
- Coordinates: 50°59′37″N 18°51′51″E

External links
- Commons: Related media on Commons

Rębielice Królewskie Wind Turbine situated south of Rębielice Królewskie, Poland is a wind power turbine built in 2003. It was designed by Józef Antos (born in 1932), graduate of technical high school in Bytom. The design process took nearly 20 years. It has a total height of 54 metres and a rotor with 33 metres diameter. The constructor said it would deliver 35 kW at a wind speed of 2 m/s, but it's impossible due to the fact that the theoretical power available from wind at 2 m/s is lower than 4.5 kW.
