= Przystajń =

- Village
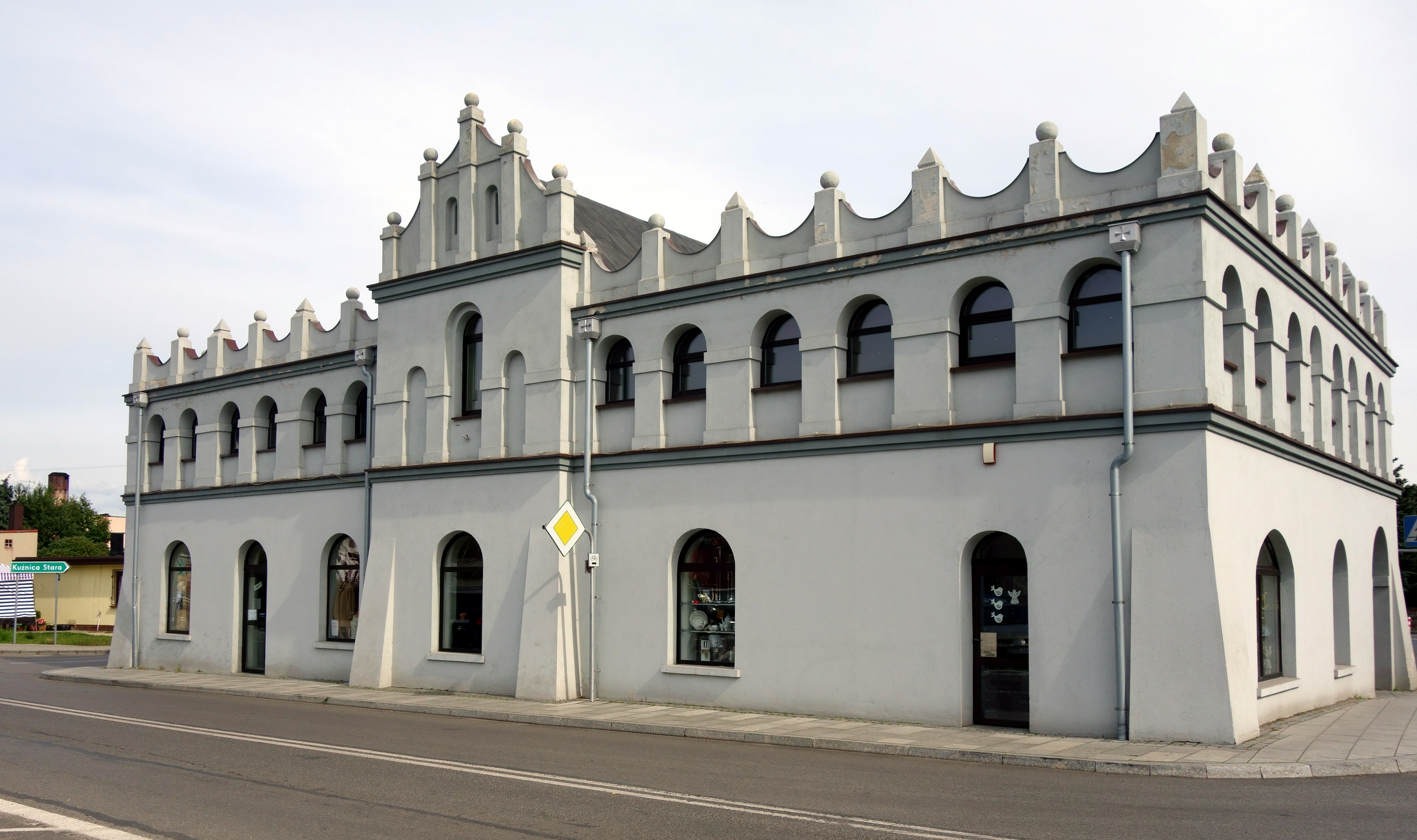
- Cloth hall

- Location within Poland
- Coordinates: 50°53′3″N 18°41′28″E
- Country: Poland
- Voivodeship: Silesian
- County: Kłobuck
- Gmina: Przystajń

Population
  - Total: 2,283

Przystajń [ˈpʂɨstai̯ɲ] is a village in Kłobuck County, Silesian Voivodeship, in southern Poland. It is the seat of the gmina (administrative district) called Gmina Przystajń.
