= Łążek, Łódź Voivodeship =

Łążek
- Village
- Location within Poland
- Coordinates: 51°3′33″N 19°5′10″E
- Country: Poland
- Voivodeship: Łódź
- County: Pajęczno
- Gmina: Nowa Brzeźnica
- Population: 128

Łążek [ˈwɔ̃ʐɛk] is a village in the administrative district of Gmina Nowa Brzeźnica, within Pajęczno County, Łódź Voivodeship, in central Poland.
