= Kuźnica, Gmina Nowa Brzeźnica =

Kuźnica
- Village
- Location within Poland
- Coordinates: 51°1′32″N 19°6′45″E
- Country: Poland
- Voivodeship: Łódź
- County: Pajęczno
- Gmina: Nowa Brzeźnica
- Population: 188

Kuźnica (Polish pronunciation: [kuʑˈɲit͡sa]) is a village in the administrative district of Gmina Nowa Brzeźnica, within Pajęczno County, Łódź Voivodeship, in central Poland.
