= Dubidze-Kolonia =

- Village
- Location within Poland
- Coordinates: 51°6′57″N 19°8′37″E
- Country: Poland
- Voivodeship: Łódź
- County: Pajęczno
- Gmina: Nowa Brzeźnica
- Population: 277

Dubidze-Kolonia [duˈbid͡zɛ kɔˈlɔɲa] is a village in the administrative district of Gmina Nowa Brzeźnica, within Pajęczno County, Łódź Voivodeship, in central Poland.
