= Gmina Panki =

Gmina Panki Panki Commune
- Gmina
- Flag Coat of arms
- Interactive map of Gmina Panki
- Coordinates (Panki): 50°53′0″N 18°45′2″E
- Country: Poland
- Voivodeship: Silesian
- County: Kłobuck
- Seat: Panki

Area
  - Total: 55.03 km^{2} (21.25 sq mi)

Population (2019-06-30)
  - Total: 5,070
  - Density: 92.1/km^{2} (239/sq mi)
- Website: http://gminapanki.pl/

Gmina Panki is a rural gmina (administrative district) in Kłobuck County, Silesian Voivodeship, in southern Poland. Its seat is the village of Panki, which lies approximately 14 kilometres (9 mi) west of Kłobuck and 73 km (45 mi) north of the regional capital Katowice.

The gmina covers an area of 55.03 square kilometres (21.2 sq mi), and as of 2019 its total population was 5,070.

The gmina contains part of the protected area called Upper Liswarta Forests Landscape Park.

== Villages ==
Gmina Panki contains the villages and settlements of Aleksandrów, Cyganka, Jaciska, Janiki, Kałmuki, Kawki, Konieczki, Koski Pierwsze, Kostrzyna, Kotary, Pacanów, Praszczyki, Żerdzina and Zwierzyniec Trzeci.

== Neighbouring gminas ==
Gmina Panki is bordered by the gminas of Krzepice, Opatów, Przystajń and Wręczyca Wielka.
