= Dworszowice Kościelne-Kolonia =

- Village
- Location within Poland
- Coordinates: 51°5′24″N 19°7′37″E
- Country: Poland
- Voivodeship: Łódź
- County: Pajęczno
- Gmina: Nowa Brzeźnica
- Population: 144

Dworszowice Kościelne-Kolonia [dvɔrʂɔˈvit͡sɛ kɔɕˈt͡ɕɛlnɛ kɔˈlɔɲa] is a village in the administrative district of Gmina Nowa Brzeźnica, within Pajęczno County, Łódź Voivodeship, in central Poland.
