= Konstantynów, Pajęczno County =

Konstantynów
- Village
- Location within Poland
- Coordinates: 51°5′13″N 19°6′33″E
- Country: Poland
- Voivodeship: Łódź
- County: Pajęczno
- Gmina: Nowa Brzeźnica
- Population: 197

Konstantynów [kɔnstanˈtɨnuf] is a village in the administrative district of Gmina Nowa Brzeźnica, within Pajęczno County, Łódź Voivodeship, in central Poland.
