= Miedźno, Silesian Voivodeship =

Miedźno
- Village
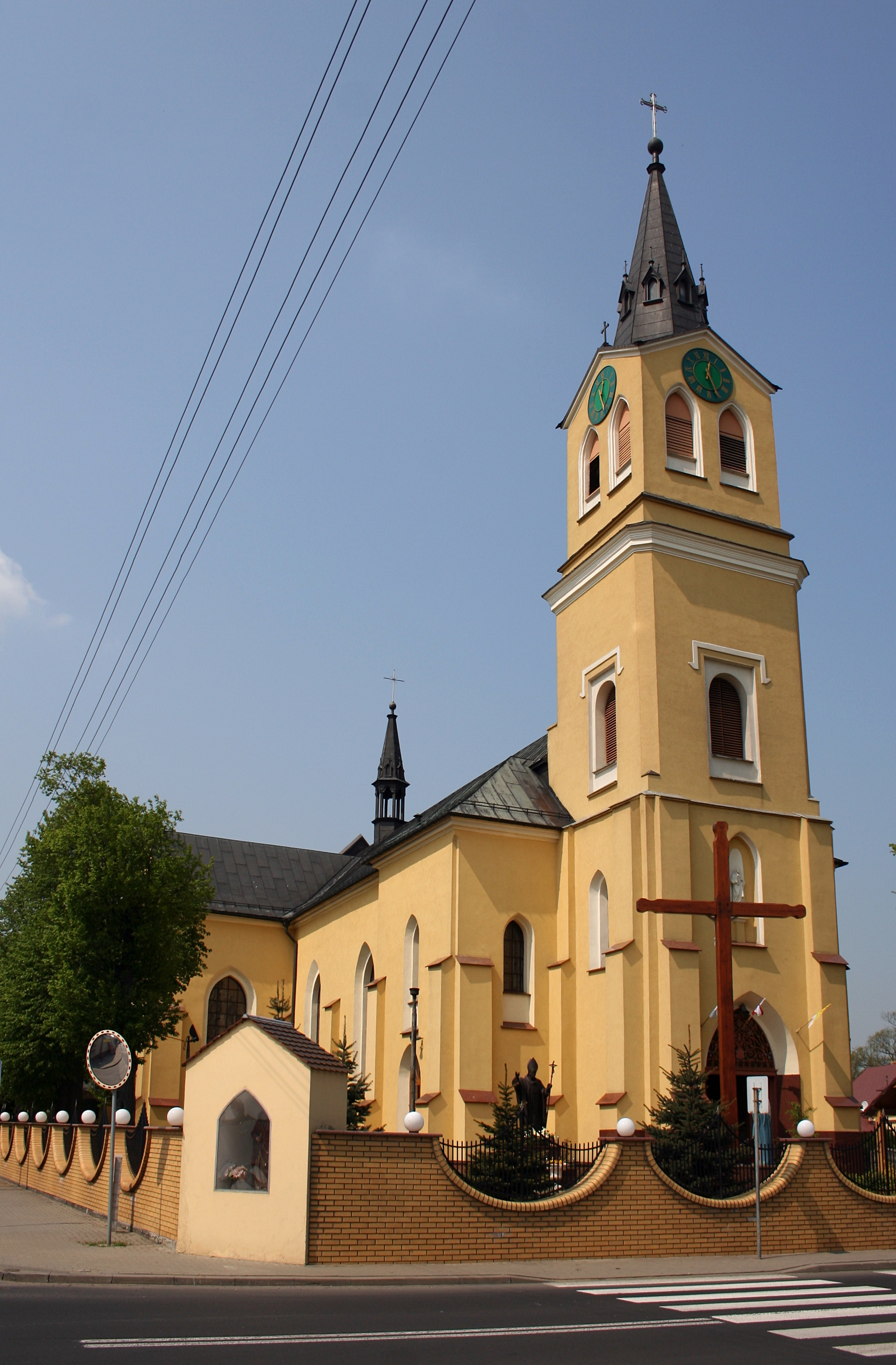
- St. Catherine's Church, 2011

- Location within Poland
- Coordinates: 50°58′13″N 18°58′55″E
- Country: Poland
- Voivodeship: Silesian
- County: Kłobuck
- Gmina: Miedźno
- Population: 2,529
- Climate: Cfb
- Website: http://www.miedzno.pl

Miedźno [ˈmjɛd͡ʑnɔ] is a village in Kłobuck County, Silesian Voivodeship, in southern Poland. It is the seat of the gmina (administrative district) called Gmina Miedźno.

From the 19th century until World War II, a Jewish community lived in Miedźno (about 90 in 1880, and 124 in 1921). After seizing the village in September 1939, the Germans sent 12 Jews from Miedźno to the Buchenwald concentration camp, and on June 22, 1942, all the others were deported to Kuźniczka near Krzepice and to the Auschwitz-Birkenau extermination camp.
