= Panki, Silesian Voivodeship =

Panki
- Village
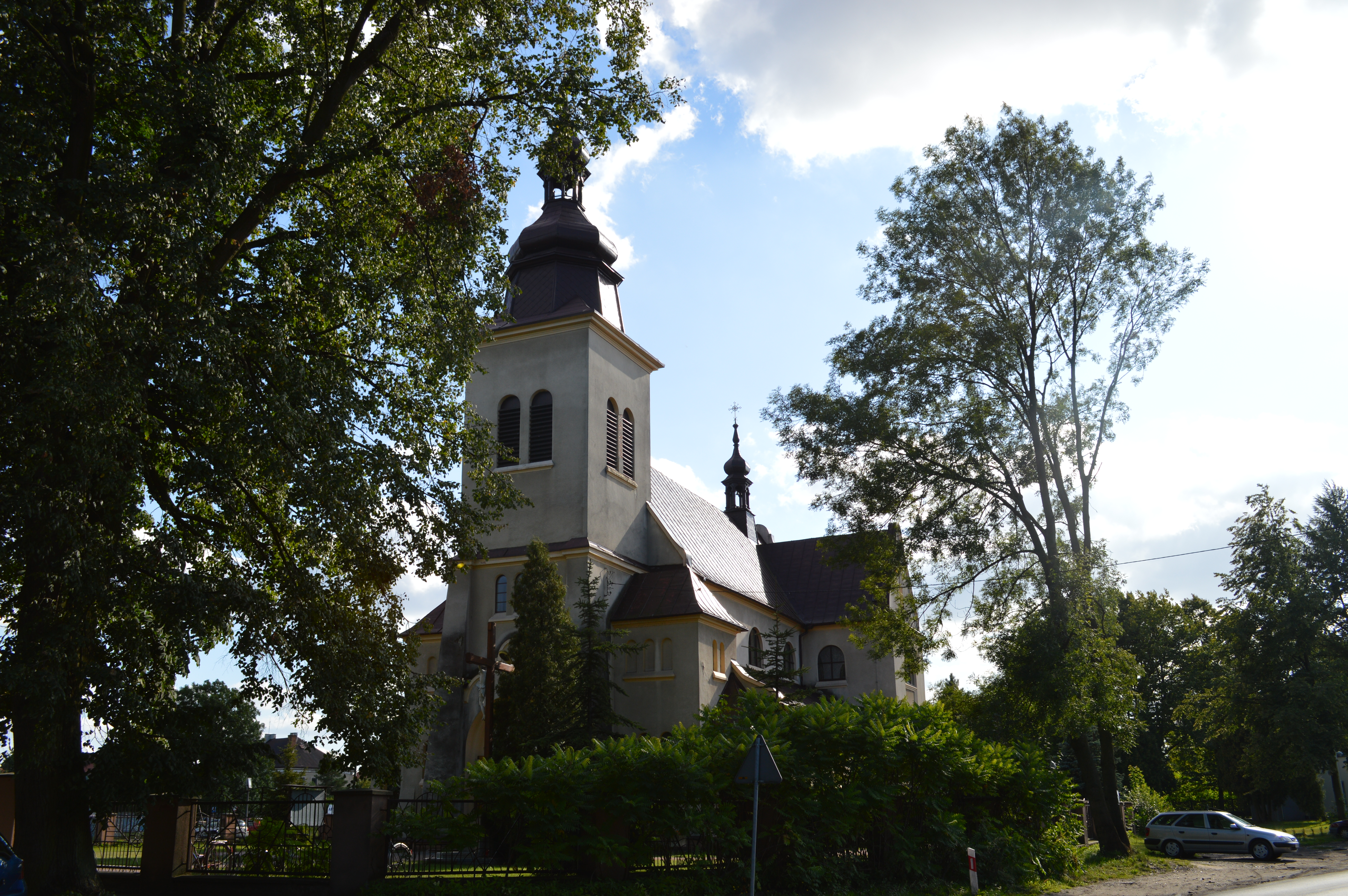
- Holy Family Church

- Location within Poland
- Coordinates: 50°53′N 18°45′E
- Country: Poland
- Voivodeship: Silesian
- County: Kłobuck
- Gmina: Panki
- Population: 1,773

Panki [ˈpanki] is a village in Kłobuck County, Silesian Voivodeship, in southern Poland. It is the seat of the gmina (administrative district) called Gmina Panki.
