= Prusicko =

- Village
- Location within Poland
- Coordinates: 51°2′N 19°12′E
- Country: Poland
- Voivodeship: Łódź
- County: Pajęczno
- Gmina: Nowa Brzeźnica
- Population: 644

Prusicko [pruˈɕit͡skɔ] is a village in the administrative district of Gmina Nowa Brzeźnica, within Pajęczno County, Łódź Voivodeship, in central Poland.
