= Kruplin Średni =

- Village
- Location within Poland
- Coordinates: 51°5′N 19°14′E
- Country: Poland
- Voivodeship: Łódź
- County: Pajęczno
- Gmina: Nowa Brzeźnica
- Population: 32

Kruplin Średni (Polish pronunciation: [ˈkruplin ˈɕrɛdɲi]) is a village in the administrative district of Gmina Nowa Brzeźnica, within Pajęczno County, Łódź Voivodeship, in central Poland.
