= Nowa Brzeźnica =

Village in Łódź Voivodeship, Poland

- Village
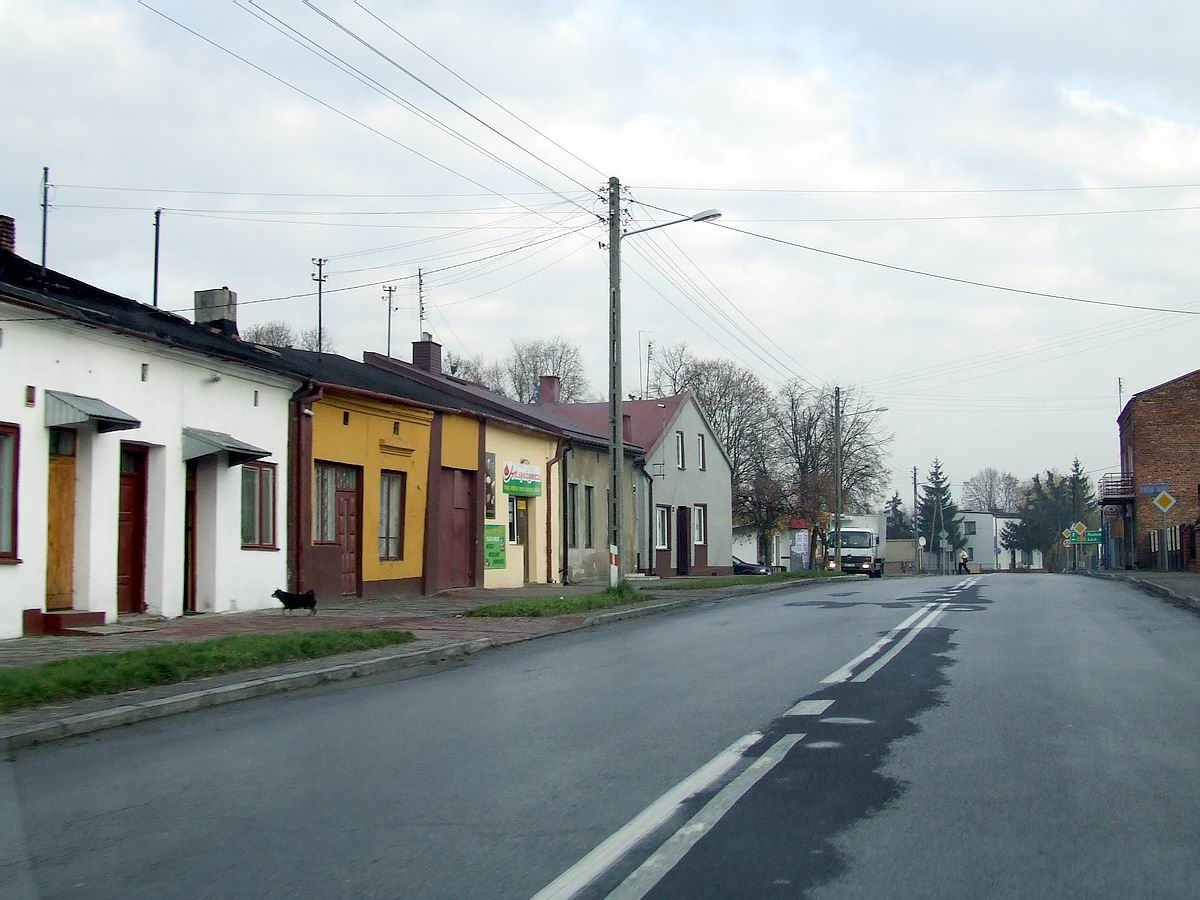
- Main street

- Coat of arms

- Location within Poland
- Coordinates: 51°4′N 19°10′E
- Country: Poland
- Voivodeship: Łódź
- County: Pajęczno
- Gmina: Nowa Brzeźnica

Population
  - Total: 750
- Time zone: UTC+1 (CET)
  - Summer (DST): UTC+2 (CEST)
- Vehicle registration: EPJ

Nowa Brzeźnica [ˈnɔva bʐɛʑˈnit͡sa] is a village in Pajęczno County, Łódź Voivodeship, in central Poland. It is the seat of the gmina (administrative district) called Gmina Nowa Brzeźnica. It is located in the historic Sieradz Land.

It was a royal town, administratively located in the Radomsko County in the Sieradz Voivodeship in the Greater Poland Province of the Kingdom of Poland.
