= Pieńki Dworszowskie =

- Settlement
- Location within Poland
- Coordinates: 51°06′04″N 19°07′06″E
- Country: Poland
- Voivodeship: Łódź
- County: Pajęczno
- Gmina: Nowa Brzeźnica
- Population: 10

Pieńki Dworszowskie [ˈpjɛɲki dvɔrˈʂɔfskʲɛ] is a settlement in the administrative district of Gmina Nowa Brzeźnica, within Pajęczno County, Łódź Voivodeship, in central Poland.
