= Kruplin-Parcela =

- Village
- Location within Poland
- Coordinates: 51°05′38″N 19°12′21″E
- Country: Poland
- Voivodeship: Łódź
- County: Pajęczno
- Gmina: Nowa Brzeźnica
- Population: 58

Kruplin-Parcela [ˈkruplin parˈt͡sɛla] is a village in the administrative district of Gmina Nowa Brzeźnica, within Pajęczno County, Łódź Voivodeship, in central Poland.
