= Janów, Pajęczno County =

Janów
- Settlement
- Location within Poland
- Coordinates: 51°00′03″N 19°11′51″E
- Country: Poland
- Voivodeship: Łódź
- County: Pajęczno
- Gmina: Nowa Brzeźnica
- Population: 3

Janów [ˈjanuf] is a settlement in the administrative district of Gmina Nowa Brzeźnica, within Pajęczno County, Łódź Voivodeship, in central Poland.
