= Dubidze =

- Village
- Location within Poland
- Coordinates: 51°6′N 19°9′E
- Country: Poland
- Voivodeship: Łódź
- County: Pajęczno
- Gmina: Nowa Brzeźnica
- Population: 712

Dubidze [duˈbid͡zɛ] is a village in the administrative district of Gmina Nowa Brzeźnica, within Pajęczno County, Łódź Voivodeship, in central Poland.
