= Zimna Woda, Pajęczno County =

Zimna Woda
- Village
- Location within Poland
- Coordinates: 51°4′N 19°7′E
- Country: Poland
- Voivodeship: Łódź
- County: Pajęczno
- Gmina: Nowa Brzeźnica
- Population: 28

Zimna Woda [ˈʑimna ˈvɔda] is a village in the administrative district of Gmina Nowa Brzeźnica, within Pajęczno County, Łódź Voivodeship, in central Poland.
