= Stoczki, Pajęczno County =

Stoczki
- Village
- Location within Poland
- Coordinates: 51°3′N 19°8′E
- Country: Poland
- Voivodeship: Łódź
- County: Pajęczno
- Gmina: Nowa Brzeźnica
- Population: 35

Stoczki [ˈstɔt͡ʂki] is a village in the administrative district of Gmina Nowa Brzeźnica, within Pajęczno County, Łódź Voivodeship, in central Poland.
