= Kostrzyna, Gmina Panki =

Kostrzyna
- Village
- Location within Poland
- Coordinates: 50°55′N 18°41′E
- Country: Poland
- Voivodeship: Silesian
- County: Kłobuck
- Gmina: Panki
- Population: 182

Kostrzyna [kɔsˈtʂɨna] is a village in the administrative district of Gmina Panki, within Kłobuck County, Silesian Voivodeship, in southern Poland.
