= Płaczki, Silesian Voivodeship =

Płaczki, Poland
- Village
- Location within Poland
- Coordinates: 51°4′N 18°57′E
- Country: Poland
- Voivodeship: Silesian
- County: Kłobuck
- Gmina: Popów
- Population: 56

Płaczki [ˈpwat͡ʂki] is a village in the administrative district of Gmina Popów, within Kłobuck County, Silesian Voivodeship, in southern Poland.
