= Zapole, Pajęczno County =

Zapole
- Village
- Location within Poland
- Coordinates: 51°0′29″N 19°10′38″E
- Country: Poland
- Voivodeship: Łódź
- County: Pajęczno
- Gmina: Nowa Brzeźnica
- Population: 28

Zapole [zaˈpɔlɛ] is a village in the administrative district of Gmina Nowa Brzeźnica, within Pajęczno County, Łódź Voivodeship, in central Poland.
