= Kaflarnia =

- Settlement
- Location within Poland
- Coordinates: 51°01′38″N 19°09′38″E
- Country: Poland
- Voivodeship: Łódź
- County: Pajęczno
- Gmina: Nowa Brzeźnica
- Population: 7

Kaflarnia [kaˈflarɲa] is a settlement in the administrative district of Gmina Nowa Brzeźnica, within Pajęczno County, Łódź Voivodeship, in central Poland.
