= Gojsc =

- Village
- Location within Poland
- Coordinates: 51°2′24″N 19°8′21″E
- Country: Poland
- Voivodeship: Łódź
- County: Pajęczno
- Gmina: Nowa Brzeźnica
- Population: 142

Gojsc [ɡɔi̯st͡s] is a village in the administrative district of Gmina Nowa Brzeźnica, within Pajęczno County, Łódź Voivodeship, in central Poland.
