= Wólka Prusicka =

- Village
- Location within Poland
- Coordinates: 51°0′47″N 19°7′26″E
- Country: Poland
- Voivodeship: Łódź
- County: Pajęczno
- Gmina: Nowa Brzeźnica
- Population: 324

Wólka Prusicka [ˈvulka pruˈɕit͡ska] is a village in the administrative district of Gmina Nowa Brzeźnica, within Pajęczno County, Łódź Voivodeship, in central Poland.
