= Gmina Krzepice =

Gmina Krzepice Krzepice Commune
- Gmina
- Coat of arms
- Interactive map of Gmina Krzepice
- Coordinates (Krzepice): 50°58′2″N 18°43′55″E
- Country: Poland
- Voivodeship: Silesian
- County: Kłobuck
- Seat: Krzepice

Area
  - Total: 78.81 km^{2} (30.43 sq mi)

Population (2019-06-30)
  - Total: 9,150
  - Density: 116/km^{2} (301/sq mi)
  - Urban: 4,456
  - Rural: 4,694
- Website: http://krzepice.pl/

Gmina Krzepice is an urban-rural gmina (administrative district) in Kłobuck County, Silesian Voivodeship, in southern Poland. Its seat is the town of Krzepice, which lies approximately 16 kilometres (10 mi) west of Kłobuck and 82 km (51 mi) north of the regional capital Katowice.

The gmina covers an area of 78.81 square kilometres (30.4 sq mi), and in 2019 its total population was 9,150.

== Villages ==
Apart from the town of Krzepice, Gmina Krzepice contains the villages and settlements of Dankowice Drugie, Dankowice Pierwsze, Dankowice Trzecie, Dankowice-Piaski, Lutrowskie, Podłęże Królewskie, Stanki, Starokrzepice, Szarki, Zajączki Drugie and Zajączki Pierwsze.

== Neighbouring gminas ==
Gmina Krzepice is bordered by the gminas of Lipie, Olesno, Opatów, Panki, Przystajń, Radłów and Rudniki.
