= Popów, Silesian Voivodeship =

Popów
- Village
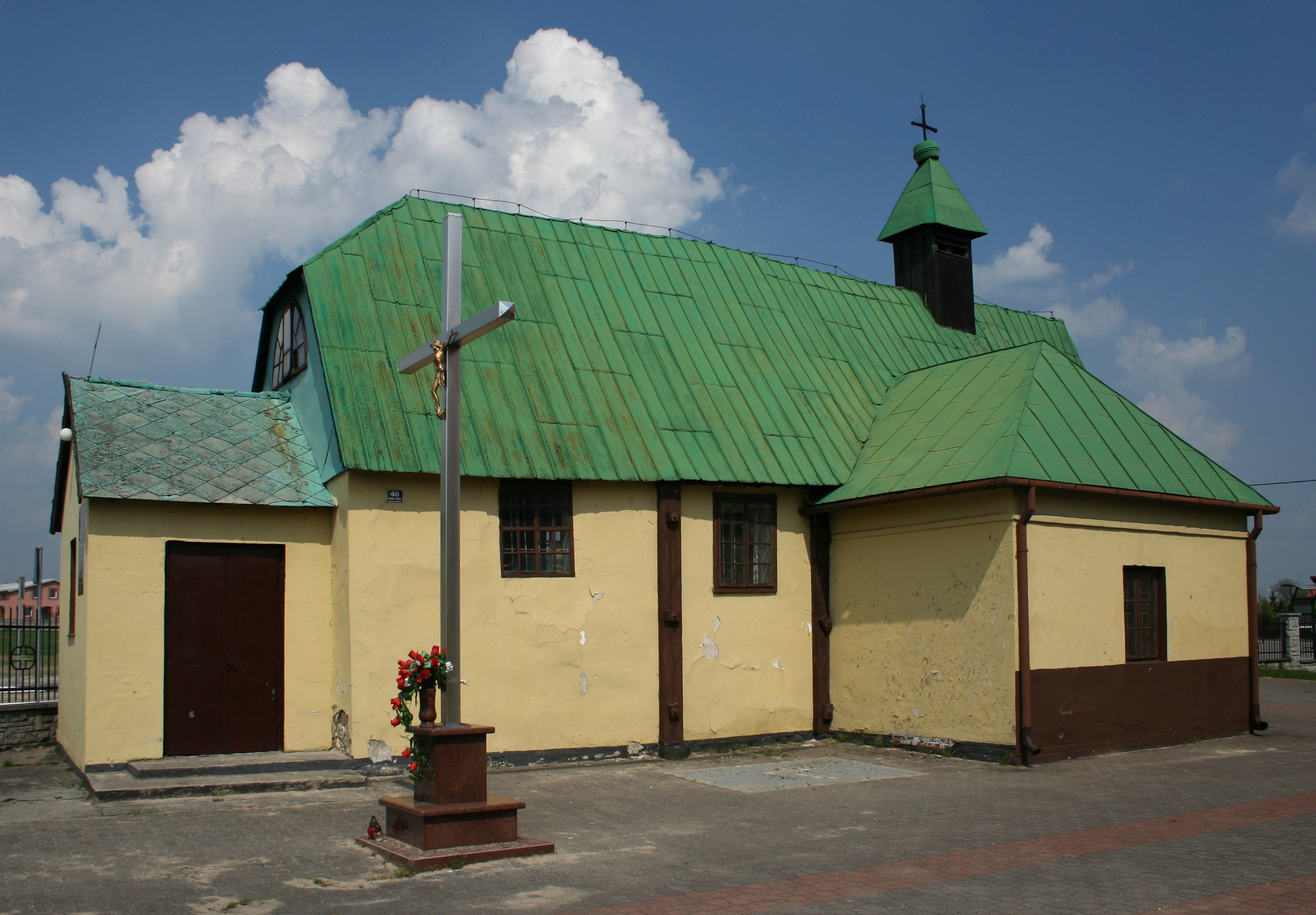
- Church of Saint Joseph

- Location within Poland
- Coordinates: 51°2′26″N 18°55′52″E
- Country: Poland
- Voivodeship: Silesian
- County: Kłobuck
- Gmina: Popów

Population
  - Total: 249

Popów [ˈpɔpuf] is a village in Kłobuck County, Silesian Voivodeship, in southern Poland. It is the seat of the gmina (administrative district) called Gmina Popów.
