= Pieńki Dubidzkie =

- Village
- Location within Poland
- Coordinates: 51°06′21″N 19°07′58″E
- Country: Poland
- Voivodeship: Łódź
- County: Pajęczno
- Gmina: Nowa Brzeźnica
- Population: 110

Pieńki Dubidzkie [ˈpjɛɲki duˈbit͡skʲɛ] is a village in the administrative district of Gmina Nowa Brzeźnica, within Pajęczno County, Łódź Voivodeship, in central Poland.
