= Gmina Nowa Brzeźnica =

Gmina Nowa Brzeźnica Nowa Brzeźnica Commune
- Gmina
- Coat of arms
- Interactive map of Gmina Nowa Brzeźnica
- Coordinates (Nowa Brzeźnica): 51°4′35″N 19°10′41″E
- Country: Poland
- Voivodeship: Łódź
- County: Pajęczno
- Seat: Nowa Brzeźnica

Area
  - Total: 135.95 km^{2} (52.49 sq mi)

Population (2006)
  - Total: 5,031
  - Density: 37.01/km^{2} (95.85/sq mi)
- Website: http://www.nowabrzeznica.pl/

Gmina Nowa Brzeźnica is a rural gmina (administrative district) in Pajęczno County, Łódź Voivodeship, in central Poland. Its seat is the village of Nowa Brzeźnica, which lies approximately 15 kilometres (9 mi) south-east of Pajęczno and 81 km (50 mi) south of the regional capital Łódź.

The gmina covers an area of 135.95 square kilometres (52.5 sq mi), and as of 2006 its total population is 5,031.

== Villages ==
Gmina Nowa Brzeźnica contains the villages and settlements of Dubidze, Dubidze-Kolonia, Dworszowice Kościelne, Dworszowice Kościelne-Kolonia, Gojsc, Janów, Jedle, Kaflarnia, Kolonia Gidelska, Konstantynów, Kruplin Radomszczański, Kruplin Średni, Kruplin-Barbarówka, Kruplin-Parcela, Kruplin-Piaski, Kuźnica, Łążek, Madera, Miroszowy, Moczydła, Nowa Brzeźnica, Orczuchy, Pieńki Dubidzkie, Pieńki Dworszowskie, Płaczki, Płaszczyzna, Prusicko, Rybaki, Rzędowie, Stara Brzeźnica, Stoczki, Trzebca, Wierzba, Wólka Prusicka, Zapole and Zimna Woda.

== Neighbouring gminas ==
Gmina Nowa Brzeźnica is bordered by the gminas of Kruszyna, Ładzice, Miedźno, Mykanów, Pajęczno, Popów and Strzelce Wielkie.
