= Miroszowy =

- Settlement
- Location within Poland
- Coordinates: 51°01′25″N 19°12′24″E
- Country: Poland
- Voivodeship: Łódź
- County: Pajęczno
- Gmina: Nowa Brzeźnica
- Population: 12

Miroszowy [mirɔˈʂɔvɨ] is a settlement in the administrative district of Gmina Nowa Brzeźnica, within Pajęczno County, Łódź Voivodeship, in central Poland.
