= Opatów, Silesian Voivodeship =

Opatów
- Village
- Location within Poland
- Coordinates: 50°57′41″N 18°49′31″E
- Country: Poland
- Voivodeship: Silesian
- County: Kłobuck
- Gmina: Opatów
- Population: 1,213

Opatów [ɔˈpatuf] is a village in Kłobuck County, Silesian Voivodeship, in southern Poland. It is the seat of the gmina (administrative district) called Gmina Opatów.

Main road connections from the Opatów include those with Wieluń and Częstochowa via the National Road DK 43.
