= Gmina Popów =

Gmina Popów Popów Commune
- Gmina
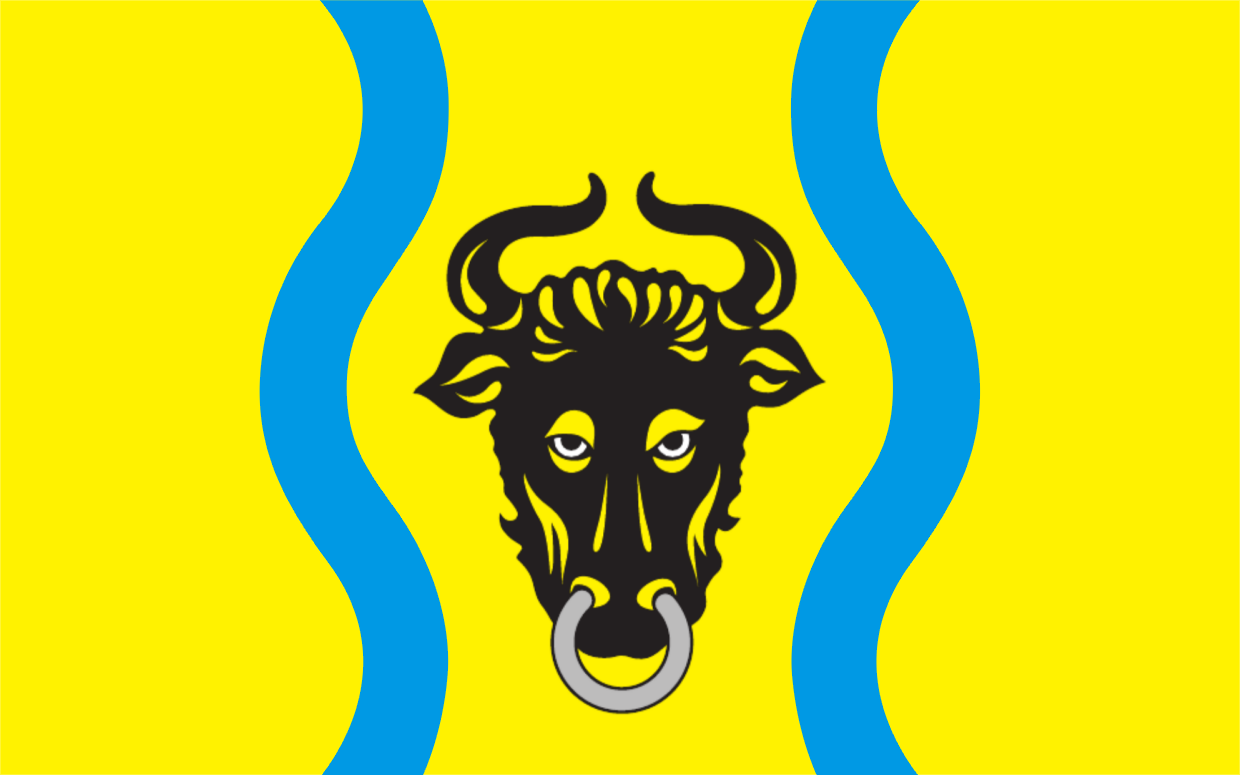
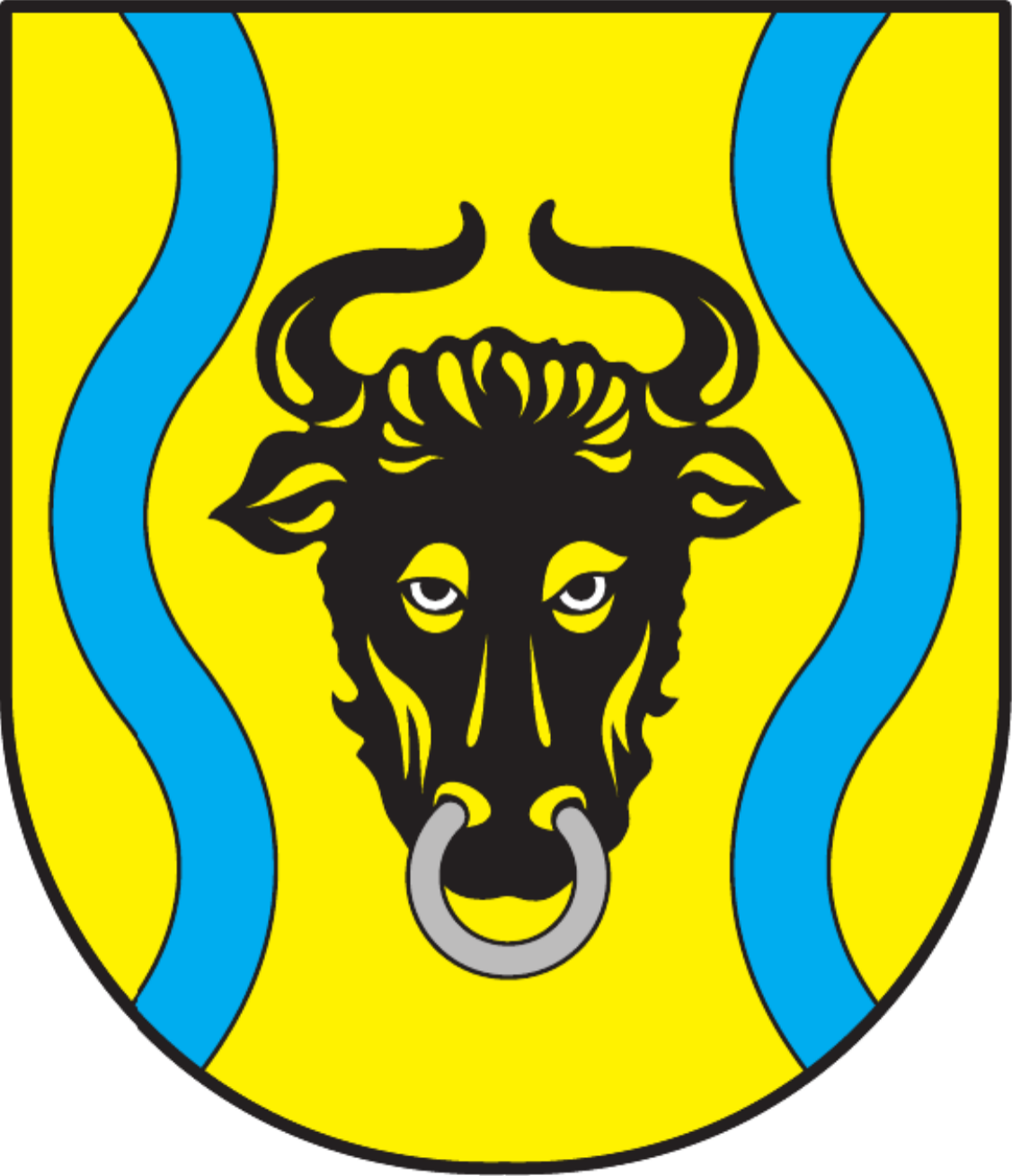
- Flag Coat of arms
- Interactive map of Gmina Popów
- Coordinates (Popów): 51°2′26″N 18°55′52″E
- Country: Poland
- Voivodeship: Silesian
- County: Kłobuck
- Seat: Popów

Area
  - Total: 102.21 km^{2} (39.46 sq mi)

Population (2019-06-30)
  - Total: 5,868
  - Density: 57.41/km^{2} (148.7/sq mi)
- Website: https://gminapopow.pl/

Gmina Popów is a rural gmina (administrative district) in Kłobuck County, Silesian Voivodeship, in southern Poland. Its seat is the village of Popów, which lies approximately 14 kilometres (9 mi) north of Kłobuck and 88 km (55 mi) north of the regional capital Katowice.

The gmina covers an area of 102.21 square kilometres (39.5 sq mi), and as of 2019 its total population is 5,868.

== Villages ==
Gmina Popów contains the villages and settlements of Annolesie, Antonie, Brzózki, Dąbrowa, Dąbrówka, Dębie, Florianów, Kamieńszczyzna, Kule, Lelity, Marianów, Nowa Wieś, Płaczki, Popów, Popów-Parcela, Rębielice Królewskie, Smolarze, Wąsosz Dolny, Wąsosz Górny, Więcki, Wrzosy, Zawady and Zbory.

== Neighbouring gminas ==
Gmina Popów is bordered by the gminas of Działoszyn, Lipie, Miedźno, Nowa Brzeźnica, Opatów and Pajęczno.
