= Gmina Miedźno =

Gmina Miedźno Miedźno Commune
- Gmina
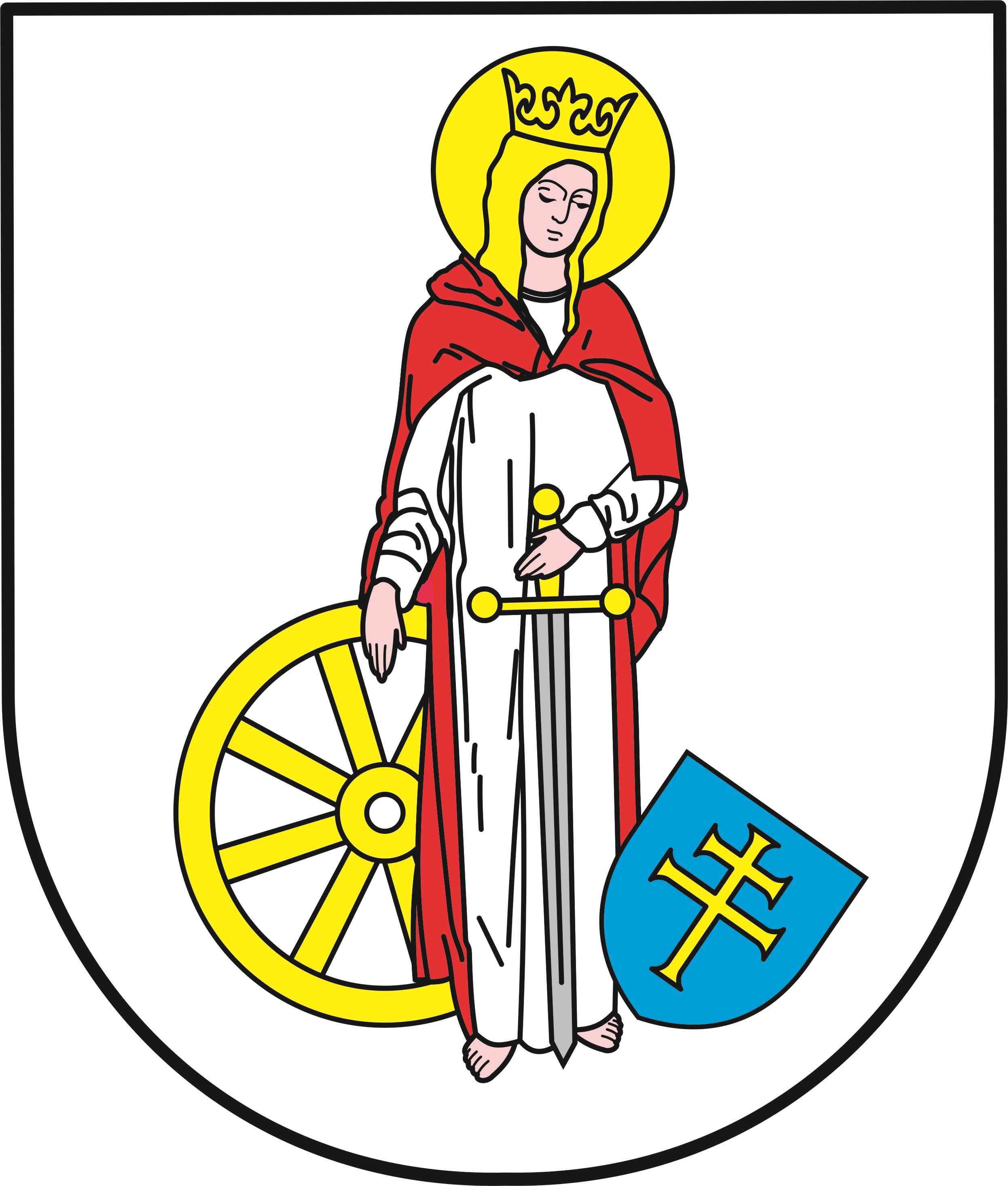
- Coat of arms
- Interactive map of Gmina Miedźno
- Coordinates (Miedźno): 50°58′13″N 18°58′55″E
- Country: Poland
- Voivodeship: Silesian
- County: Kłobuck
- Seat: Miedźno

Area
  - Total: 113.17 km^{2} (43.70 sq mi)

Population (2019-06-30)
  - Total: 7,551
  - Density: 66.72/km^{2} (172.8/sq mi)
- Website: https://www.miedzno.pl/

Gmina Miedźno is a rural gmina (administrative district) in Kłobuck County, Silesian Voivodeship, in southern Poland. Its seat is the village of Miedźno, which lies approximately 7 kilometres (4 mi) north-east of Kłobuck and 80 km (50 mi) north of the regional capital Katowice.

The gmina covers an area of 113.17 square kilometres (43.7 sq mi), and in 2019 its total population was 7,551.

== Villages ==
Gmina Miedźno contains the villages and settlements of Borowa, Izbiska, Kołaczkowice, Mazówki, Miedźno, Mokra, Nowy Folwark, Ostrowy nad Okszą, Rywaczki, Wapiennik and Władysławów.

== Neighbouring gminas ==
Gmina Miedźno is bordered by the gminas of Kłobuck, Mykanów, Nowa Brzeźnica, Opatów and Popów.
