= Madera, Łódź Voivodeship =

Madera
- Settlement
- Location within Poland
- Coordinates: 51°04′22″N 19°05′27″E
- Country: Poland
- Voivodeship: Łódź
- County: Pajęczno
- Gmina: Nowa Brzeźnica
- Population: 8

Madera [maˈdɛra] is a settlement in the administrative district of Gmina Nowa Brzeźnica, within Pajęczno County, Łódź Voivodeship, in central Poland.
