= Moczydła, Pajęczno County =

Moczydła
- Village
- Location within Poland
- Coordinates: 51°01′58″N 19°11′16″E
- Country: Poland
- Voivodeship: Łódź
- County: Pajęczno
- Gmina: Nowa Brzeźnica
- Population: 36

Moczydła [mɔˈt͡ʂɨdwa] is a village in the administrative district of Gmina Nowa Brzeźnica, within Pajęczno County, Łódź Voivodeship, in central Poland.
