= Kruplin Radomszczański =

- Village
- Location within Poland
- Coordinates: 51°4′43″N 19°13′12″E
- Country: Poland
- Voivodeship: Łódź
- County: Pajęczno
- Gmina: Nowa Brzeźnica
- Population: 500
- Website: http://www.kruplin.yoyo.pl/

Kruplin Radomszczański [ˈkruplin radɔmʂˈt͡ʂaɲski] is a village in the administrative district of Gmina Nowa Brzeźnica, within Pajęczno County, Łódź Voivodeship, in central Poland.
