= Płaszczyzna, Łódź Voivodeship =

Płaszczyzna
- Village
- Location within Poland
- Coordinates: 51°03′39″N 19°05′40″E
- Country: Poland
- Voivodeship: Łódź
- County: Pajęczno
- Gmina: Nowa Brzeźnica
- Population: 31

Płaszczyzna [pwaʂˈt͡ʂɨzna] is a village in the administrative district of Gmina Nowa Brzeźnica, within Pajęczno County, Łódź Voivodeship, in central Poland.
