= Jedle, Łódź Voivodeship =

Village in Gmina Nowa Brzeźnica, Poland

Jedle
- Village
- Location within Poland
- Coordinates: 51°01′11″N 19°12′09″E
- Country: Poland
- Voivodeship: Łódź
- County: Pajęczno
- Gmina: Nowa Brzeźnica
- Population: 87

Jedle [ˈjɛdlɛ] is a village in the administrative district of Gmina Nowa Brzeźnica, within Pajęczno County, Łódź Voivodeship, in central Poland.
