= Mały Potok =

Location
- Country: Poland

Mały Potok is a river of Poland, a tributary of the Kłobucki Potok.
