= Płaczki, Łódź Voivodeship =

Płaczki
- Village
- Location within Poland
- Coordinates: 51°3′8″N 19°6′17″E
- Country: Poland
- Voivodeship: Łódź
- County: Pajęczno
- Gmina: Nowa Brzeźnica
- Population: 22

Płaczki [ˈpwat͡ʂki] is a village in the administrative district of Gmina Nowa Brzeźnica, within Pajęczno County, Łódź Voivodeship, in central Poland.
