= Rybaki, Łódź Voivodeship =

Rybaki
- Settlement
- Location within Poland
- Coordinates: 51°02′17″N 19°11′41″E
- Country: Poland
- Voivodeship: Łódź
- County: Pajęczno
- Gmina: Nowa Brzeźnica
- Population: 18

Rybaki [rɨˈbaki] is a settlement in the administrative district of Gmina Nowa Brzeźnica, within Pajęczno County, Łódź Voivodeship, in central Poland.
