= Wierzba, Łódź Voivodeship =

Wierzba
- Settlement
- Location within Poland
- Coordinates: 51°00′06″N 19°09′14″E
- Country: Poland
- Voivodeship: Łódź
- County: Pajęczno
- Gmina: Nowa Brzeźnica
- Population: 0

Wierzba [ˈvjɛʐba] was a settlement in the administrative district of Gmina Nowa Brzeźnica, within Pajęczno County, Łódź Voivodeship, in central Poland.

== History ==
It was burned when Hitler invaded with his army of Nazi soldiers.
