= Sułtańska Woda =

Stream in Poland

Location
- Country: Poland

Sułtańska Woda (German: Sulten Wasser) is a stream of Poland, a tributary of the Kłobucki Potok. It flows through the northern part of the Bukowa Forest in the West Pomeranian Voivodeship.

Sultańska Woda is a stream flowing from the wetlands of a valley stretching north of Polana Dobropolska and west of the elevation along which Droga Dobropolska runs; it flows into the Kłobucki Potok from its right bank opposite Zameczna Góra. The Polish name is derived from a mistranslation of the German name: dialect. sulten = salzig: salty.
