= Gmina Opatów, Silesian Voivodeship =

Gmina Opatów Opatów Commune
- Gmina
- Coat of arms
- Interactive map of Gmina Opatów
- Coordinates (Opatów): 50°57′41″N 18°49′31″E
- Country: Poland
- Voivodeship: Silesian
- County: Kłobuck
- Seat: Opatów

Area
  - Total: 73.54 km^{2} (28.39 sq mi)

Population (2019-06-30)
  - Total: 6,816
  - Density: 92.68/km^{2} (240.1/sq mi)
- Website: http://www.opatow.gmina.pl/

Gmina Opatów is a rural gmina (administrative district) in Kłobuck County, Silesian Voivodeship, in southern Poland. Its seat is the village of Opatów, which lies approximately 10 kilometres (6 mi) north-west of Kłobuck and 80 km (50 mi) north of the regional capital Katowice.

The gmina covers an area of 73.54 square kilometres (28.4 sq mi), and as of 2019 its total population is 6,816.

== Villages ==
Gmina Opatów contains the villages and settlements of Brzezinki, Iwanowice Duże, Iwanowice Małe, Iwanowice-Naboków, Opatów, Waleńczów, Wilkowiecko, Złochowice, Zwierzyniec Drugi and Zwierzyniec Pierwszy.

== Neighbouring gminas ==
Gmina Opatów is bordered by the gminas of Kłobuck, Krzepice, Lipie, Miedźno, Panki, Popów and Wręczyca Wielka.
