= Kłobuck County =

Kłobuck County Powiat kłobucki
- County
- Flag Coat of arms

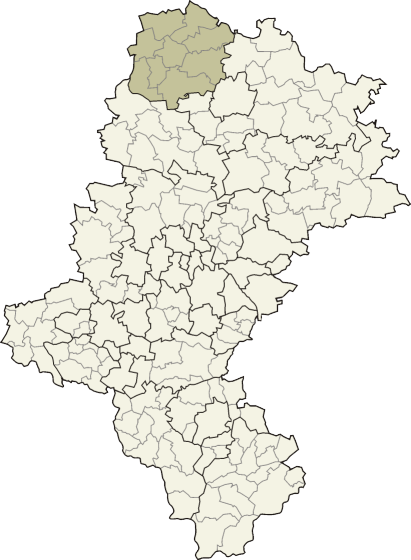
- Location within Silesian Voivodeship
- Coordinates (Kłobuck): 50°55′N 18°56′E
- Country: Poland
- Voivodeship: Silesian
- Seat: Kłobuck
- Gminas: Total 9: Gmina Kłobuck; Gmina Krzepice; Gmina Lipie; Gmina Miedźno; Gmina Opatów; Gmina Panki; Gmina Popów; Gmina Przystajń; Gmina Wręczyca Wielka

Area
  - Total: 889.15 km^{2} (343.30 sq mi)

Population (2019-06-30)
  - Total: 84,762
  - Density: 95.329/km^{2} (246.90/sq mi)
  - Urban: 17,390
  - Rural: 67,372
- Car plates: SKL
- Website: www.powiatklobucki.pl

Kłobuck County (Polish: powiat kłobucki) is a unit of territorial administration and local government (powiat) in Silesian Voivodeship, southern Poland. It came into being on January 1, 1999, as a result of the Polish local government reforms passed in 1998. Its administrative seat and largest town is Kłobuck, which lies 75 kilometres (47 mi) north of the regional capital Katowice. The only other town in the county is Krzepice, lying 16 km (10 mi) west of Kłobuck.

The county covers an area of 889.15 square kilometres (343.3 sq mi). As of 2019 its total population is 84,762, out of which the population of Kłobuck is 12,934, that of Krzepice is 4,456, and the rural population is 67,372.

== Neighbouring counties ==
Kłobuck County is bordered by Pajęczno County to the north, the city of Częstochowa and Częstochowa County to the south-east, Lubliniec County to the south-west, Olesno County to the west, and Wieluń County to the north-west.

== Administrative divisions ==
The county is subdivided into nine gminas (two urban-rural and seven rural). These are listed in the following table, in descending order of population.

Gmina	Type	Area (km^{2})	Population (2019)	Seat
Gmina Kłobuck	urban-rural	130.4	20,412	Kłobuck
Gmina Wręczyca Wielka	rural	148.1	17,760	Wręczyca Wielka
Gmina Krzepice	urban-rural	78.8	9,150	Krzepice
Gmina Miedźno	rural	113.2	7,551	Miedźno
Gmina Opatów	rural	73.5	6,816	Opatów
Gmina Lipie	rural	99.1	6,254	Lipie
Gmina Przystajń	rural	88.9	5,881	Przystajń
Gmina Popów	rural	102.2	5,868	Popów
Gmina Panki	rural	55.0	5,070	Panki

== Rivers ==
- Mały Potok
- Sułtańska Woda
