= Hyacinth Graf Strachwitz =

German World War II general

Hyacinth Graf Strachwitz von Groß-Zauche und Camminetz
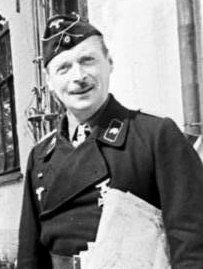
- Strachwitz as Oberst and commander of Panzer-Regiment "Großdeutschland", June 1943
- Born: 30 July 1893; Groß Stein, Province of Silesia, German Empire
- Died: 25 April 1968 (aged 74); Trostberg, Upper Bavaria, Germany
- Burial place: Cemetery in Grabenstätt
- Military career
- Allegiance: German Empire (to 1918); Weimar Republic (to 1933); Nazi Germany
- Branch: Heer
- Service years: 1912–45
- Rank: Generalleutnant of the Reserves
- Nicknames: Conté, Der Panzergraf
- Units: Guards Cavalry Division; Freikorps "von Hülsen"; 1. Panzer Division
- Commands: Panzer-Regiment "Großdeutschland"
- Conflicts: World War I Silesian Uprisings: Battle of Annaberg; World War II: Invasion of Poland; Battle of France; Battle of Sedan; Battle of Dunkirk; Invasion of Yugoslavia; Operation Barbarossa; Battle of Kiev; Battle of Stalingrad; Third Battle of Kharkov; Battle of Kursk; Battle of Narva; Narva Offensive (18–24 March 1944); Battle for Narva Bridgehead; Soviet re-occupation of Latvia in 1944; Šiauliai Offensive; Operation Doppelkopf
- Awards: Ritterkreuz des Eisernen Kreuzes mit Eichenlaub, Schwertern und Brillanten
- Other work: land owner and farmer, military advisor

Hyacinth Graf Strachwitz von Groß-Zauche und Camminetz (Note: According to Röll his first name is spelled "Hyacinth". Groß-Zauche, in German, is spelled with a "sharp S"; see ß.) (30 July 1893 – 25 April 1968) was a German Army officer of aristocratic descent. Strachwitz saw action in World War I, but rose to fame for his command of armoured forces in World War II. For these services he was awarded the Knight's Cross of the Iron Cross with Oak Leaves, Swords and Diamonds (German: Ritterkreuz des Eisernen Kreuzes mit Eichenlaub, Schwertern und Brillanten). At the time of its presentation to Strachwitz it was Nazi Germany's highest military decoration. (Note: In 1944, the Knight's Cross of the Iron Cross with Oak Leaves, Swords and Diamonds was second only to the Grand Cross of the Iron Cross (Großkreuz des Eisernen Kreuzes), which was awarded only to senior commanders for winning a major battle or campaign, in the military order of the Third Reich. The Knight's Cross of the Iron Cross with Oak Leaves, Swords and Diamonds as the highest military order was surpassed on 29 December 1944 by the Knight's Cross of the Iron Cross with Golden Oak Leaves, Swords and Diamonds (Ritterkreuz des Eisernen Kreuzes mit Goldenem Eichenlaub, Schwertern und Brillanten).)

Strachwitz was born in 1893 on his family estate in Silesia. He was educated at various Prussian military academies and served with distinction as a cavalry officer in the opening weeks of World War I. He was captured by the French in October 1914 and almost executed on the spot for wearing civilian clothes. He was later sentenced to forced labour and after an odyssey through various French prisons and several escape attempts he returned to Germany after the war in 1918. In the aftermath of World War I, Strachwitz fought with the Freikorps in the Spartacist uprising of the German Revolution in Berlin, and in the Silesian Uprisings against the Poles and Polish Silesians of Upper Silesia. In the mid-1920s he took over the family estate, Groß Stein, from his father and became a member of the Nazi Party and the Allgemeine SS. As an officer in the reserves, he participated in various military exercises during the 1930s.

At the outbreak of World War II, Strachwitz was appointed ordnance officer in his unit. He participated in the Invasion of Poland and later in the Battle of France. Transferred to the 16th Panzer Division he fought in the Invasion of Yugoslavia and Operation Barbarossa, the German invasion of the Soviet Union. He fought with distinction on the Eastern Front which led to the presentation of high awards such as the Knight's Cross of the Iron Cross with Oak Leaves, for the destruction of more than 270 Soviet tanks and artillery pieces within 48 hours in the tank battle of Kalach. He was given command of Panzer-Regiment "Großdeutschland" and received the Swords to his Knight's Cross, for his contribution in the counterattack at Kharkov. He then fought in the Battle of Kursk and the German retreat to the Dnieper. While commanding a battle group at Narva front in early 1944 he was awarded the Diamonds to his Knight's Cross on 15 April. He was wounded 12 times during the war, and was also injured in an automobile accident.

In 1945, he surrendered to US forces and was taken into custody. By the time of his release in June 1947, his youngest son had been killed in action, his wife had been killed in a road accident, and his Silesian estate had been confiscated by Poland. He remained in West Germany, married again and briefly worked for the Syrian Armed Forces as a military consultant. He lived on an estate in Bavaria from 1951 until his death from lung cancer on 25 April 1968. He was buried with military honours in Grabenstätt, Bavaria.

== Childhood, education and early career ==
Strachwitz was born on 30 July 1893 in Groß Stein, in the district of Groß Strehlitz in Silesia, a province in the Kingdom of Prussia. Today it is Kamień Śląski, in Gogolin, Opole Voivodeship, Poland. Strachwitz was the second child of Hyacinth Graf Strachwitz (1864–1942) and his wife Aloysia (1872–1940), (Note: Full name is Maria Aloysia Hedwig Friederike Therese Oktavie, Gräfin von Matuschka, Freiin von Toppolczan und Spaetgen.) née Gräfin von Matuschka Freiin von Toppolczan und Spaetgen. He had an older sister, Aloysia (1892–1972), followed by his younger brother Johannes (1896–1917) nicknamed "Ceslaus", his sister Elisabeth (1897–1992), his brother Manfred (1899–1972), his brother Mariano (1902–22), and his youngest sister Margarethe (1905–1989). His family were members of the old Silesian nobility (Uradel), and held large estates in Upper Silesia, including the family Schloss (Palace) at Groß Stein. As the first-born son he was the heir to the title Graf (Count) Strachwitz, and following family tradition he was christened Hyacinth, after the 12th century saint. Some clothing belonging to the saint were in the family's possession until 1945.

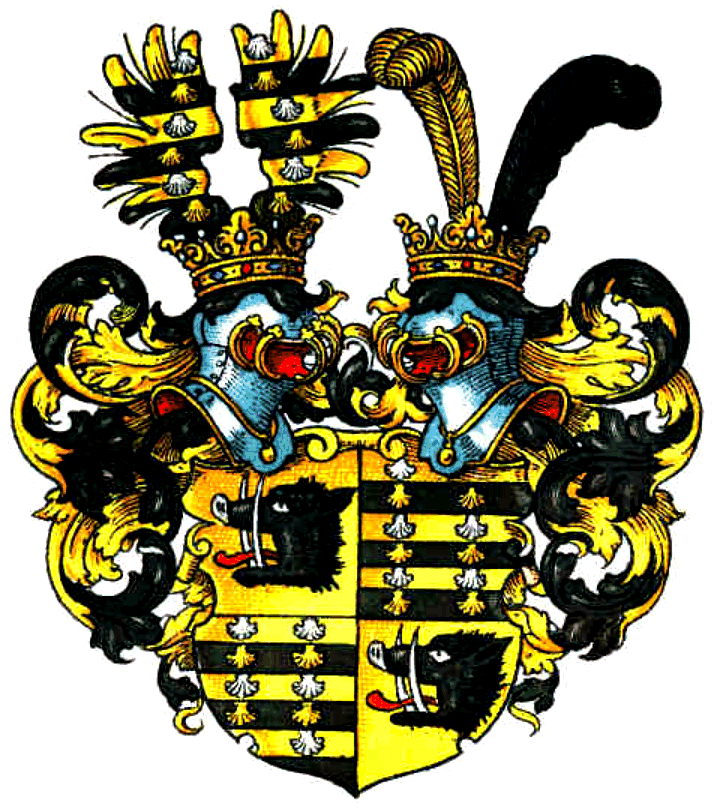
Graf Strachwitz Coat of Arms.

Strachwitz attended the Volksschule (primary school) and the Gymnasium (advanced secondary school) in Oppeln—present-day Opole. He received further schooling and paramilitary training at the Königlich Preußischen Kadettenkorps (Royal Prussian cadet corps) in Wahlstatt—present-day Legnickie Pole—before he transferred to the Hauptkadettenanstalt (Main Military Academy) in Berlin-Lichterfelde. Among his closest friends at the cadet academy were Manfred von Richthofen, the World War I flying ace and a fellow Silesian, and Hans von Aulock, brother of the World War II colonel Andreas von Aulock. In August 1912, Cadet Strachwitz was admitted to the élite Gardes du Corps (Life Guards) cavalry regiment in Potsdam as a Fähnrich (Ensign). The Life Guards had been established by Prussian King Frederick the Great in 1740, and were considered the most prestigious posting in the Imperial German Army. Their patron was Emperor Wilhelm II, who nominally commanded them. Strachwitz was sent to an officer training course at the Kriegsschule (War School) in Hanover in late 1912, where he excelled at various sports. Strachwitz was commissioned as Leutnant (Second Lieutenant) on 17 February 1914. At this early stage of his career in Potsdam, Strachwitz began insisting on being addressed as "Herr Graf" rather than "Herr Leutnant", even from higher-ranking officers, a quirk that he maintained throughout his career. He always felt prouder of his aristocratic descent than of his military rank. His close friends called him Conté (Count).

Upon his return from Hanover to the Prussian Main Military Academy, Strachwitz was appointed sports-officer for the Life Guards, where he introduced the soldiers to daily gymnastics and weekly endurance running. The sports team of the Life Guards was selected to participate in the 1916 Olympic Games, which further encouraged his ambition. He participated in many sporting activities, particularly equestrian, fencing and track and field athletics, which became his prime focus. Strachwitz continued to excel as a sportsman, and with his friend Prince Friedrich Karl of Prussia, was among the best athletes to train for the Olympic Games.

== World War I ==
The German strategy for war at the time was manifested in the Schlieffen Plan. The plan, created by Count Alfred von Schlieffen, for victory in a possible war in which the German Empire might find itself fighting on two fronts: France to the west and Russia to the east. The strategy to avoid a two-front war was to mobilize rapidly, concentrate troops in the west to quickly defeat the French and then, if necessary, rush those troops by rail to the east to face the Russians before they had time to mobilize fully. The plan in the west further envisaged a disregard for the neutrality of Luxembourg and Belgium and an overwhelming sweep of the powerful German right wing southwest through Belgium and Northern France.

The outbreak of World War I, which was triggered by the assassination of Archduke Franz Ferdinand of Austria and his wife Sophie, Duchess of Hohenberg on 28 June 1914 in Sarajevo, destroyed his Olympic ambitions. Strachwitz, along with the rest of the Imperial German Army, was mobilized and sent west. The Russian Empire ordered a partial mobilization one day later and the German Empire mobilized on 30 July 1914. Strachwitz received his mobilization order while on vacation in Silesia, and he packed his bags and returned to his unit in Berlin immediately. His regiment was subordinated to the Guards Cavalry Division and scheduled for deployment in the west.

Shortly after the mobilization, the Life Guards arrived at their position near the Belgian border. Strachwitz and his platoon volunteered for a mounted, long-distance reconnaissance patrol, which would penetrate far behind enemy lines. His orders were to gather intelligence on enemy rail and communications connections and potentially disturb them, as well as report on the war preparations being made by the enemy. If the situation allowed, he was to destroy railway and telephone connections and to derail trains, causing as much havoc as possible. His patrol ran into many obstacles and they were constantly on the verge of being detected by either British or French forces. Their objective was the Paris–Limoges–Bordeaux train track. Strachwitz dispatched a messenger, who broke through to the German lines and delivered the intelligence they had gathered. The patrol blew up the signal box at the Fontainebleau railway station, and tried to force their way through to presumed German troops at the Marne near Châlons. However the French forces were too strong and they were unable to get through. After six weeks behind enemy lines their rations were depleted and they had to live by stealing or begging. Strachwitz then intended to head for Switzerland, hoping that the French-Swiss border was not as heavily protected. After a brief skirmish with French forces, one of Strachwitz's men was seriously wounded, which forced them to seek medical attention. During many weeks of outdoor living their uniforms had deteriorated, so Strachwitz took that opportunity to buy new clothes for his men. Their progress was slowed by a wounded comrade, and they were caught in civilian clothes by French forces.

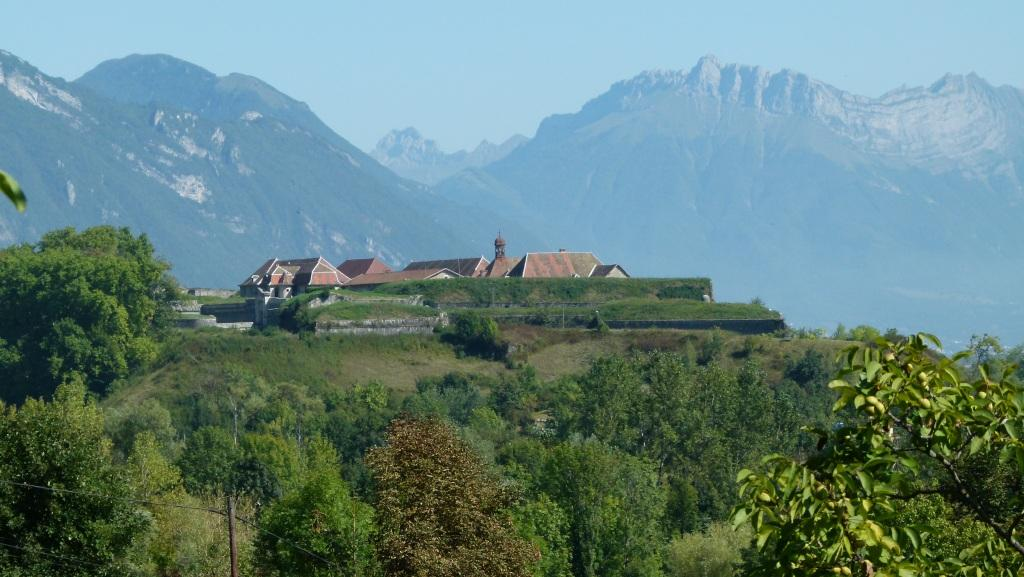
Fort Barraux, 2011

Strachwitz and his men were questioned by a French captain and accused of being spies and saboteurs. They were taken to the prison at Châlons the next day where they were separated. Strachwitz, as an officer, was placed in solitary confinement. Early in the morning they were all lined up for the firing squad, but a French captain arrived just in time to stop the execution. Strachwitz and his men were then tried before a French military court on 14 October 1914. The court sentenced them all to five years of forced labour on the prison island of Cayenne. At the same time they were deprived of rank, thus losing the status of prisoners of war. Strachwitz was then taken to the prisons at Lyon and Montpellier, and then to the Île de Ré, from where the prison ship would depart for Cayenne. It is unclear what circumstances prevented his departure, but he was imprisoned at Riom and Avignon instead. At Avignon prison he was physically and mentally tortured by both the guards and the other prisoners. The torture included being chained naked to a wall, deprived of food and beaten severely. After one year at Avignon he was put in a German uniform and taken to Fort Barraux, used as a prisoner of war facility during the war.

At Barraux he learned that the war in the west had turned into a war of attrition and that only on the Eastern Front were German troops still reporting successes. His health improved rapidly and Strachwitz started making escape plans. With other German soldiers he started digging an escape tunnel, which was detected. Strachwitz was again put in solitary confinement. As a deterrence against German U-boat attacks, German prisoners of war were sometimes carried in the cargo holds of French merchant ships. Now classified as "determined to escape", Strachwitz was put in the cargo hold of a ship which commuted between Marseille or Toulon and Thessaloniki, Greece. Appearing skeletal after four trips without food, he was returned to Barraux. During further solitary confinement he recovered again, and made further escape plans. With a fellow soldier, he climbed over the prison walls, planning to head for neutral Switzerland. However, Strachwitz injured his foot when he fell into barbed wire, and the injury caused blood poisoning. While searching for help, they were picked up by the French police and turned over to a military court. He was then sent to a war prison for officers at Carcassonne where his request for medical attention was ignored. The injury was severe and he became delirious. An inspection by the Swiss medical commission from the International Red Cross ordered him transferred to a hospital in Geneva, Switzerland, where he awoke after days of unconsciousness.

Strachwitz recovered quickly in Geneva. During his convalescence he was visited by the Queen of Greece, the sister of the German Emperor, Sophia of Prussia, the Duke of Mecklenburg Frederick Francis IV and the Duke of Hesse Ernest Louis. The Archbishop of Munich Michael von Faulhaber, who was on his way to the Vatican, also stopped by to pay his respects. The doctors told Strachwitz that the French government had requested his extradition back to France once he had fully recovered, to serve his full term of five years of forced labour. Strachwitz then moved into a villa in Luzern where he was visited by his mother and sister. He had a great fear of being returned to France, and together they came up with a plan to avoid his extradition. He would "sit out the war" in a mental asylum in Switzerland. The plan worked, though Strachwitz was on the verge of going genuinely mad in the process. The war ended and Strachwitz was released to return to Germany. For his service during the war while imprisoned by the French he was awarded the Iron Cross (Eisernes Kreuz) Second and First Class.

== Interwar period ==
=== In the Weimar Republic ===
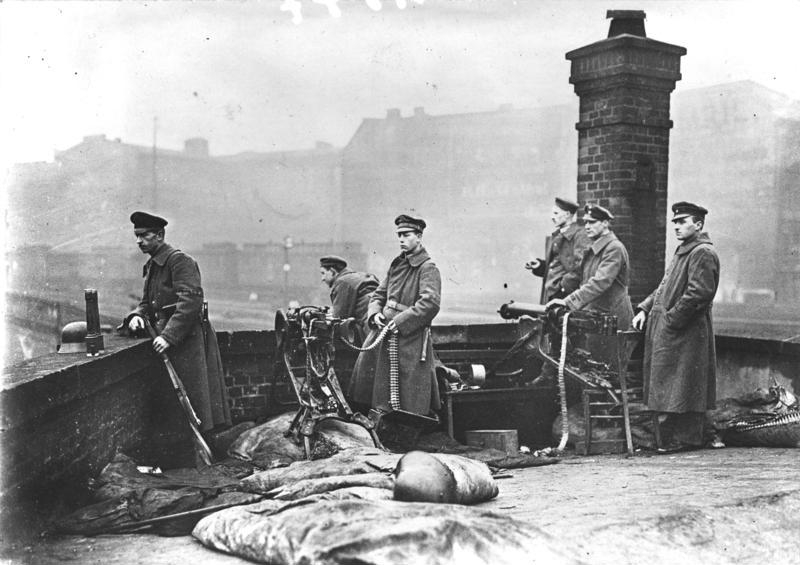
Troops loyal to the government at the Silesian Station, 1919.

After the Armistice in November 1918, Strachwitz was repatriated and returned to a Germany in civil turmoil. He travelled to Berlin via Konstanz, at the Swiss-German border, and Munich. On his journey he saw many former German soldiers whose military discipline had broken down. Unable to tolerate this situation and fearing a Communist revolution, he travelled on to Berlin, arriving at the Berlin Anhalter Bahnhof where he was met by a friend. Strachwitz had called ahead asking his friend to bring him his Gardes du Corps uniform, which he put on immediately. Berlin was in a state of revolution. The newly established provisional government under the leadership of Chancellor Friedrich Ebert was threatened by the Spartacist uprising of the German Revolution, whose ambition was a Soviet-style proletarian dictatorship. Ebert ordered the former soldiers, organized in Freikorps (paramilitary organizations) among them Strachwitz, to attack the workers and put down the uprising.

In early 1919, following these events in Berlin, Strachwitz returned to his home estate, where he found his family palace taken over by French officers. Upper Silesia was occupied by British, French and Italian forces, and being governed by an Inter-Allied Committee headed by a French general, Henri Le Rond. The Versailles Treaty at the end of World War I had shifted formerly German territory into neighbouring countries, some of which had not existed at the beginning of the war. In the case of the new Second Polish Republic, the Treaty detached some 54,000 square kilometres (21,000 sq mi) of territory, which had formerly been part of the German Empire, to recreate the country of Poland, which had disappeared as a result of the Third Partition of Poland in 1795. His father urged him to prepare and educate himself in order to take over the family estate and business. He was put under the guidance of his father's Oberinspektor (Chief Inspector). In parallel, Strachwitz, fearing that Silesia was being "handed over to the Poles", as he viewed the actions of the Inter-Allied Committee, joined the Oberschlesischer Selbstschutz (Upper Silesian Self Defence). Strachwitz collected weapons and recruited volunteers, which was prohibited. He was caught four times and put in prison in Oppeln by the French. Also his father had to go to prison for his opposition to the Inter-Allied Committee. His distrust for the French, rooted in his experiences as a prisoner of war during World War I, was immense. He believed that only the Italians had played an honest and neutral role in the occupation of Upper Silesia. On 25 July 1919, he married Alexandrine Freiin Saurma-Jeltsch, nicknamed "Alda", and their first child, a son, was born on 4 May 1920.

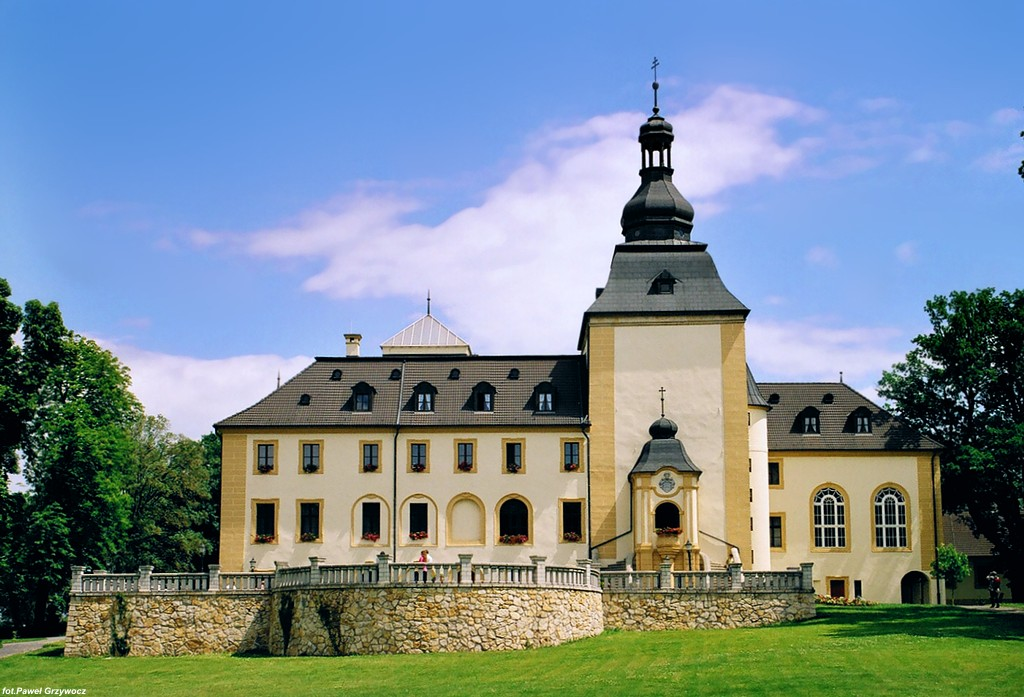
The ancestral home of the Strachwitz family, the palace in Kamień Śląski in 2006.

In 1921, during the Silesian Uprisings, when Poland tried to separate Upper Silesia from the Weimar Republic, Strachwitz served under the Generals Bernhard von Hülsen and Karl Höfer. At the peak of the conflict when the Poles dug in on the Annaberg, a hill near the village of Annaberg—present-day Góra Świętej Anny. The German Freikorps launched the assault in what would become the Battle of Annaberg, which was fought between 21 May and 26 May 1921. Strachwitz and his two battalions outflanked the Polish positions and overran part of them in hand-to-hand combat around midnight on 21 May. Strachwitz was the first German to reach the summit. They captured six field guns, numerous machine guns, rifles and ammunition. On 4 June the Freikorps attacked Polish positions at Kandrzin—present-day Kędzierzyn—and Slawentzitz—present-day Sławięcice. In this battle Strachwitz and his men captured a Polish artillery battery which they turned against the Poles. For these services he received the Schlesischer Adler (Silesian Eagle) medal, Second and First Class with Oak Leaves and Swords. His younger brother Manfred also fought for Silesia, and was severely wounded leading his men at Krizova. Two months later his wife gave birth to their second child, a daughter named Alexandrine Aloysia Maria Elisabeth Therese born on 30 July 1921, nicknamed "Lisalex". The Ministry of the Reichswehr informed him in 1921 that he had been promoted to Oberleutnant (First Lieutenant), the promotion backdated to 1916. The Strachwitz family grew further when on 22 March 1925 a third child, a son named Hubertus Arthur, nicknamed "Harti", was born on their manor at Schedlitz, later renamed Alt Siedel—present-day Siedlec.

In 1925, Strachwitz and his family moved from their palace in Groß Stein to their manor in Alt Siedel, because of personal differences with his father, who remained in Groß Stein. Between 1924 and 1933 Strachwitz founded two dairy cooperatives which many local farmers joined. In parallel he studied a few semesters of forestry. He used his knowledge to influence the Silesian forest owners to sell their wood to the paper mills. He continued to use his influence in Upper Silesia to modernize forestry and farming. His ambitions were aided by his presidency of the Forstausschuss (Forestry Committee) of Upper Silesia and his membership in the Landwirtschaftskammer (Chamber of Agriculture). Strachwitz completely took over his father's estate in 1929, first as the General Manager and then as owner, with full responsibility. This made Strachwitz one of the most wealthy land and forest owners in Silesia. Along with the palace in Groß Stein he owned a lime kiln and quarry in Klein Stein—present-day Kamionek—and Groß Stein, a distillery in Groß Stein and Alt Siedel. (Note: Annual production at Groß Stein was 92,894 litres (24,540 US gal) and 116,386 litres (30,746 US gal) at Alt Siedel. Of his 4,109-hectare (10,150-acre) property, 1,182.6 hectares (2,922 acres) were farmland, 69.9 hectares (173 acres) meadows, 26.3 hectares (65 acres) pastures, 6.1 hectares (15 acres) water, 2,737.3 hectares (6,764 acres) forest, 10 hectares (25 acres) parks, and 6.6 hectares (16 acres) gardens, 35 hectares (86 acres) wasteland and 19.4 hectares (48 acres) buildings and farms, as well as 16 roads. His agricultural production included forest seeds, rye, barley, corn, potatoes, lupins and malt. In animal husbandry he had feral, cattle, horse breeding, Deutsches Edelschwein (German pig), merinos and fish. Strachwitz also owned the manor in Alt Siedel with a property size of 583 hectares (1,440 acres). 278 hectares (690 acres) were farmland, 13.5 hectares (33 acres) pastures, 3.5 hectares (8.6 acres) gardens, 279 hectares (690 acres) forest, 1.5 hectares (3.7 acres) water, and 5 hectares (12 acres) were buildings. The manor in Einsiedel, in Freudenthal—present-day Bruntál in the Czech Republic—Upper Silesia, with its oak forests and farmland, belonged to him as well.)

=== National Socialism ===
He applied for membership in the Nazi Party (NSDAP—National Socialist German Workers' Party) with the Reichsleitung (Reich Leadership) of the NSDAP in Munich in 1931. (Note: Röll states that Strachwitz believed that he could better politically represent his Upper Silesian agricultural and forestry interests by joining the NSDAP.) He was accepted and in 1932 joined the Ortsgruppe (Local Group) of the NSDAP in Breslau with a membership number 1,405,562. On 17 April 1933 he became a member of the Allgemeine SS with the SS membership number 82,857. This decision started a series of quick promotions within the SS. He had progressed to SS-Obersturmführer by the end of 1934 and SS-Sturmbannführer in 1936. In parallel to his SS-career, his military rank in the military reserve force also advanced. He attained the rank of Hauptmann (Captain) of the Reserves in 1934 and a year later became a Rittmeister (Cavalry Captain) of the Reserves.

On 30 January 1933, the Nazi Party, under the leadership of Adolf Hitler, came to power and began to rearm Germany. The Heer (Germany Army) was increased and modernized with a strong focus on the Panzer (tank) force. Personnel were recruited from the cavalry. In October 1935 Panzer-Regiment 2 was created and was subordinated to the 1st Panzer Division, at the time under command of General Maximilian von Weichs. The soldiers of the I. Abteilung (1st Battalion) came from Saxony and Thuringia, the II. Abteilung (2nd Battalion) was made up from soldiers from Silesia. Strachwitz, who had served as an officer of the reserves in Reiter-Regiment 7 (7th Cavalry Regiment) in Breslau, had asked to be transferred to the Panzer force and, in May 1936, participated in his first manoeuvre on the training ground at Ohrdruf, followed by an exercise of live firing on the gunnery training ground at Putlos—today in the administrative district of Oldenburg-Land—near the Baltic Sea. A year later, from July to August 1937, he participated in a second reserve training exercise on the Silesian training grounds at Neuhammer—present-day Świętoszów.

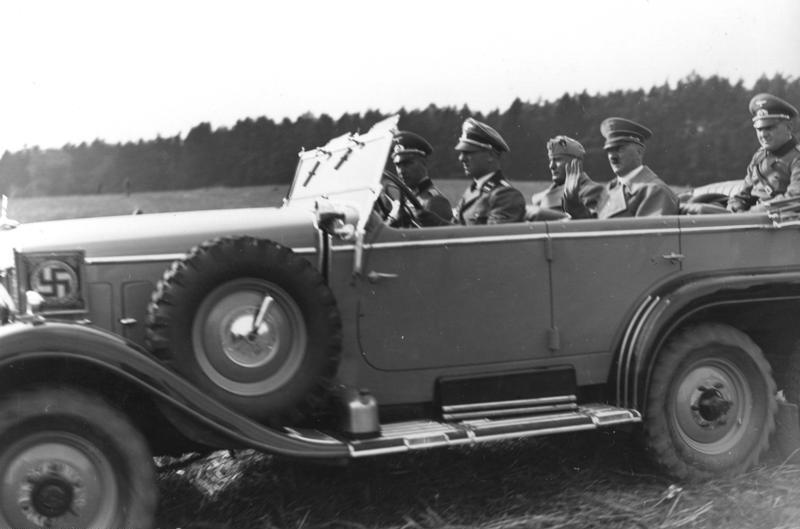
Mussolini, Hitler and Friedrich Hoßbach at the Wehrmacht manoeuvre, September 1937.

Following a brief vacation back home in Silesia, Strachwitz was back with the 1st Panzer Division at the training grounds at Königsbrück near Dresden. During the preparations for the fall manoeuvres the General der Kavallerie (General of the Cavalry) von Weichs was dismissed. On 18 September Panzer-Regiment 2 was relocated from Königsbrück to Fürstenberg and then to Neustrelitz. Here, under the watchful eyes of Hitler and Benito Mussolini from the Schmooksberg near Laage, the 1st and 3rd Panzer-Brigade, supported by Kampfgeschwader (Bomber Wings), practiced a large scale tank attack. The regiment returned to Eisenach on 30 September. Strachwitz returned home to his estate but was called back shortly before the Anschluß, the annexation of Austria by Germany, in March 1938.

Strachwitz and his Panzer-Regiment 2 were on standby alert from 21 September – 2 October 1938 at the training grounds in Grafenwöhr during the so-called Sudeten Crisis, the German annexation of Czechoslovakia's northern and western border regions, known collectively as the Sudetenland. On 3 October the regiment headed for Karlsbad, via Gossengrün and Chodau, where they arrived on 5 October. The regiment was stationed at Saatz and Kaaden in the Sudetenland until 15 October before it returned to Eisenach on 16 October 1938. He was again put on standby in March 1939, when the remaining Czech territories became the Protectorate of Bohemia and Moravia, a German satellite. Following this alert, he, along with Panzer-Regiment 2, were sent to Berlin in April 1939 to participate in the Wehrmacht parade held to celebrate Hitler's 50th birthday on 20 April 1939. In the prelude of World War II in July and August 1939, Panzer-Regiment 2 participated in the summer manoeuvres in Jüterbog and Putlos, followed by exercises on the training grounds at Altengrabow. The 1st Panzer Division left their training grounds in Thuringia and Hesse on 21 August 1939 and were transported by train to Silesia between Rosenberg—present day Olesno—and Oppeln, where they arrived on the night 24/25 August 1939. Strachwitz arrived at his regiment on 26 August where he, as oldest officer of the reserve force, was assigned the critical role of organizing the military logistics of resupplying the troops on the battlefield.

== World War II – der Panzergraf ==
Panzer-Regiment 2, under the command of Oberst (Colonel) Karl Keltsch, as part of the 1st Panzer Division, consisted of four light companies and two medium companies totalling 54 Panzer Is, 62 Panzer IIs, 6 Panzer IIIs, 28 Panzer IVs and 6 command Panzers. The regiment located further east in a forest near Klein-Lassowitz on the eve of 28 August 1939. Fall Weiß (Case White), Hitler's directive for the invasion of Poland, became effective and forces of the Wehrmacht invaded Poland without a formal declaration of war on 1 September 1939 which marked the beginning of World War II in Europe. His regiment also crossed the border that day at Grunsruh and reached the river Lisswarthe at noon. They took Klobutzko that evening without much resistance. On 2 September they proceeded on towards Biała Górna, where they suffered the first casualties of the war. They then crossed the Warthe at Gidle and Plauno heading for Radomsko. Suffering further losses, they conquered Petrikau on 5 September. The regiment reached Góra Kalwaria at the Vistula via Wolbórz and Zawada on 8 September. Here the regiment was allowed to rest until 10 September. On this day, Keltsch informed him that Strachwitz had been nominated for the Clasp to the Iron Cross (Spange zum Eisernen Kreuz) 2nd Class for his organizational achievements, which he received on 5 October 1939. Keltsch also announced that the Panzer-Brigade 1 (1st Panzer Brigade) had requested his transfer. Generalmajor (Major General) Ferdinand Schaal, commander of Panzer-Brigade 1 at the time, welcomed him and made him responsible for organizing the replenishment of the entire brigade. On 3 October 1939, three days before the victory over Poland the 1st Panzer Division was ordered back to their home bases in Germany. They arrived on 12 October 1939. The equipment underwent intensive maintenance and Strachwitz went home to the manor at Alt Siedel for a lengthy vacation. The palace in Groß Stein had been made available to the Wehrmacht and was being used as a field hospital. When Strachwitz returned to his division in late 1939, the 1st Panzer Division had been relocated to the greater Dortmund area with the Stab (staff) located in Düsseldorf.

=== Battle of France ===
At the end February 1940 the commanding general of the 1st Panzer Division, Generalleutnant (Lieutenant General) Rudolf Schmidt, was replaced by Generalmajor Friedrich Kirchner. Strachwitz at the time was out sick with meningitis and in a hospital from 1–9 March 1940. While he was on sick leave, the division was relocated to the South Eifel on 3 March. The Stab established the headquarters in the hotel "Union" in Cochem. The division, along with 2nd and 10th Panzer Divisions, were subordinated to XIX Armeekorps under the command of General der Panzertruppe (General of the Armoured Corps) Heinz Guderian. The soldiers were awaiting the order for Fall Gelb (Case Yellow), Hitler's directive for the Battle of France. The 1st Panzer Division had orders to cross the border at Wallendorf heading towards Luxembourg, taking the Belgian first line of defence at Martelange and then Neufchâteau. The first main objective was the Meuse River (Maas River) northwest of Sedan. Strachwitz at the time was in the hospital again from 28 April – 9 May 1940, receiving treatment for an injured foot.

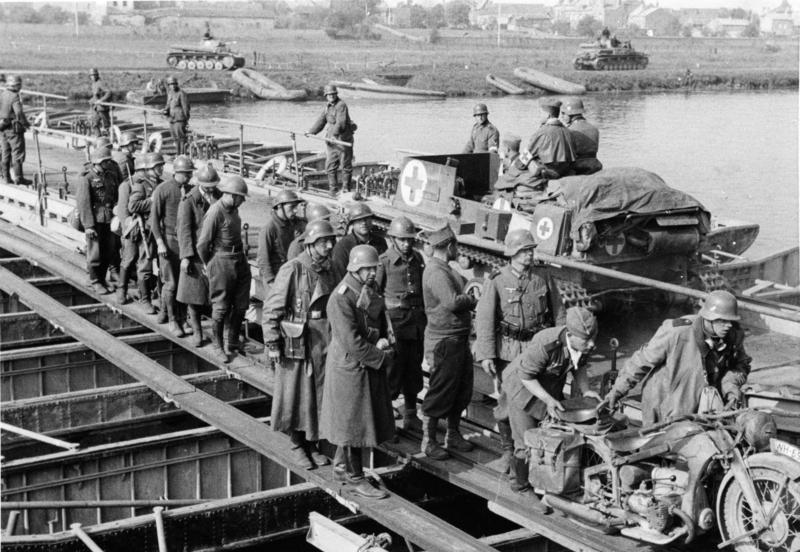
1st Panzer Division crossing the Meuse on 14 May 1940.

Kirchner received the order for Fall Gelb at 13:15, during lunch, on 9 May 1940. The German attack began at 5:35 on the morning of 10 May 1940. The XIX Armeekorps advanced without resistance through Luxembourg and reached the Belgian border at 10:00. The 1st and 2nd Panzer Division reached the line Menufontaine (south of Bastogne) – Fauvillers, the 10th Panzer Division the line Rulles (west of Habay) – St. Marie (west of Étalle), that evening. The advance breached the second Belgian line of defence at Bouillon and Neufchâteau on 11 May. The German forces, consisting of the 1st and 10th Panzer Division reached the area north of Sedan on the night of 12/13 May. The following day at 8:00 German Ju 87 Stuka's and bombers from Luftflotte 3 (3rd Air Fleet) targeted the French and Belgian forces in what would become the Battle of Sedan. At 15:30 the German artillery began a 30-minute bombardment followed by a further aerial attack. German troops began crossing the Meuse at 16:00 in rubber assault boats. The assault company of Kradschützen-Bataillon I (1st Motorcycle Infantry Battalion) under the command of Wend von Wietersheim established the first bridgehead north of Igles and west of Saint-Menges.

By 01:00 on 14 May, a pontoon bridge had been erected over which elements of the 1st Panzer Division began crossing the Meuse into the bridgeheads. General Marcel Têtu, commander of the Allied Tactical Air Forces ordered an air strike against the pontoon bridge. Between 15:00–16:00 Allied bombers and fighters attacked the bridge. During this attack, Strachwitz organized the traffic across the bridge and ensured delivery of the anti-aircraft ammunition to help fend off the aerial attack, which inflicted only minor damage and did not stop the German advance. Panzer-Pionierbataillon 37 and Sturm-Pionierbataillon 43 ran into enemy tanks at Chéhéry and Panzer-Brigade I into French tanks at Bulson. More than 70 French tanks were left destroyed on the battlefield. While Kirchner ordered the bulk of 1st Panzer Division to keep heading west, French General Charles Huntziger ordered elements of his IIe Armée to protect the heights of Stonne, south of Sedan. This dissipated his forces and the French resistance was broken near Vendresse.

During the advance in France Strachwitz adopted the thinking that "Tanks must be led from the front!" Even in his role as supply officer he led "from the front". During one of his "solo runs", Strachwitz and his driver stumbled into an enemy-occupied barracks. Unable to withdraw, he requested to speak to the French commanding officer and convinced him to surrender his unit. Leading the way, Strachwitz drove 600 French soldiers and their vehicles into captivity. The element of surprise was enough to overcome a numerically superior enemy force.

"One can achieve enormous success with only a few, but good people."

— Hyacinth Graf Strachwitz von Gross-Zauche und Camminetz

Following these events the 1st Panzer Division continued to push forward, reaching the Channel coast near Calais on 23 May 1940, where they encountered heavy British resistance. The 10th Panzer Division was tasked with taking Calais, while Guderian ordered the 1st Panzer Division to head for Gravelines. Elements of the Panzer-Brigade I, the subordinated Infanterie-Regiment (motorized) "Großdeutschland" and the Panzeraufklärungsabteilung 4 (Tank Reconnaissance Detachment 4) reached the Aa river south of Gravelines that night, 16 kilometres (9.9 mi) southwest of Dunkirk. Strachwitz again went on one of his "solo runs", penetrated the French and British lines and almost reached Dunkirk, where he observed the evacuation of British and allied forces by sea. He quickly reported back his observations to his divisional command. The Ia (operations officer) Major im Generalstab (in the General Staff) Walther Wenck informed him that aerial reconnaissance had made the same observations but the Führerhauptquartier had ordered the Panzers to halt. Three days later Hitler ordered the attack to continue but the opportunity to capture the majority of the Allied forces had been lost. The remaining defenders of Dunkirk continued to hold out until 4 June.

Parts of the 1st Panzer Division were relocated via Arras, Cambrai and Hirson to Rethel on 2 June. The second phase of the Battle of France, Fall Rot (Case Red), was about to begin and Strachwitz returned to his Panzer-Regiment 2 where he again organized the replenishment of the troops. The 1st Panzer Division flanked on the right by the 2nd Panzer Division and the XXXXI. Armeekorps (motorized) on the left, was ordered to cross the Aisne River breaching the French defences and head south. The first main objective was the Canal du Rhine au Marne which was roughly 100 kilometres (62 mi) away. The French defenders of the Weygand-line, named after Maxime Weygand, had built strong defences, running parallel to the Aisne and Aisne Canal. The German attack began on 5 June with Heeresgruppe B (Army Group B), under the command of Generaloberst (Colonel General) Fedor von Bock, attacking between the Channel coast and the Aisne. Heeresgruppe A (Army Group A), under Generaloberst Gerd von Rundstedt, to which the 1st Panzer Division was subordinated, was held back until 9 June. Strachwitz in the meantime had been awarded the Clasp to the Iron Cross 1st Class on 6 June for his daring "solo runs". The two regiments of the 1st Panzer Division cross the Aisne on the night of 9/10 June 1940. The two regiments advanced quickly to Neuflize and Juniville, where they were engaged in combat with French tanks. The advance proceeded along La Neuveville to Bétheniville and Saint-Hilaire-le-Petit. The military training grounds at Mourmelon-le-Grand was captured on 12 June. The fortress Langres surrendered to Panzer-Regiment 2 on 15 June and Besançon the following day. The final objective was Belfort, which capitulated after a short resistance. This ended the Battle of France for Strachwitz's regiment. Panzer-Regiment 2 was then stationed at Doubs until 3 July 1940, it was then relocated to Saint Denis, north of Paris, from 3–8 July.

On 21 July the regiment was relocated again, this time in the vicinity of Orléans where it was based for four weeks. The regiment was ordered to detach two Panzer companies and the headquarters unit of the I. Abteilung (1st Department). These units augmented by other Panzer companies formed four Schwimm-Panzerabteilungen (amphibious tank departments) for Operation Sea Lion, the planned and aborted invasion of the United Kingdom. The remnants of Panzer-Regiment 2 were transferred to East Prussia, where they were based at Heiligenbeil, present-day Mamonovo.

=== Balkans campaign ===
On 2 October 1940, following the Battle of France, Panzer-Regiment 2 was subordinated to the 16th Panzer Division. Strachwitz asked the divisional commander Generalmajor Hans Hube for the command of a Panzer company, and Hube gave Strachwitz the I. Bataillon, a position he held until October 1942. Strachwitz and his men trained on the new Panzer III with 5 cm KwK 38 cannon. He paid special attention to the training and integration of the replacements crews which joined his unit. In December 1940, 16th Panzer Division was declared a Lehrtruppe (demonstration troop), a unit to be involved in experimentation with new weapons and tactics. Via Bavaria, Austria and Hungary they were transferred to Romania, with Strachwitz's I. Battalion stationed at Mediaș.

The division was tasked with the protection of the oil fields at Ploiești, which were vital to the German war effort. They trained some Romanian officers in German Panzer tactics. Apart from training and keeping their equipment in perfect order, the soldiers had nothing to do and became bored. In March 1941 Strachwitz was sent back to Cosel in Germany where a new replacement unit was to be founded. He returned via his home town and 24 hours later a telegram from Hube called him back. This was preceded by a series of events in Belgrade. On 25 March 1941, the government of Prince Paul of Yugoslavia had signed the Tripartite Pact, joining the Axis powers in an effort to stay out of World War II. This was immediately followed by mass protests in Belgrade and a military coup d'état led by Air Force commander General Dušan Simović. As a result, Hitler chose not only to support Mussolini's ambitions in Albania and in the Greco-Italian War but also to attack Yugoslavia. For this purpose the mobilized forces of Panzergruppe I (1st Panzer Group) under the command of Generaloberst Paul Ludwig Ewald von Kleist were ordered to attack Belgrade in what would become the Invasion of Yugoslavia.

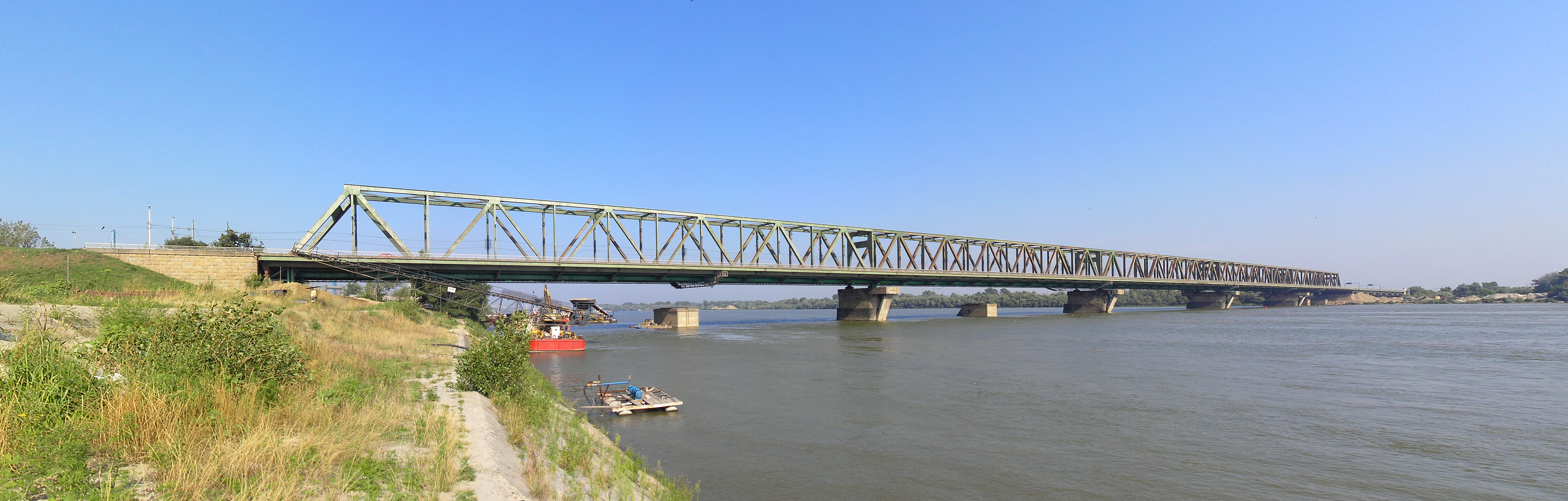
Pančevo Bridge in 2011

Strachwitz's I. Battalion received the order to prepare for the attack on 6 April 1941 at 09:00. His orders were to break through with the Infanterie-Regiment (motorized) "Großdeutschland" to Belgrade via Werschetz—present-day Vršac. His right flank was protected by the SS-Division "Das Reich" and his left flank by the 11th Panzer Division. The attack was preceded by a heavy artillery barrage and the Germans crossed the border at 10:30. The defences were quickly taken and the German troops reached the Werschetz where they were greeted by cheering inhabitants and a band. Their next objective was the River Danube. They reached the Danube at Pančevo only to find the bridge there destroyed. At Pančevo Strachwitz's unit linked up with the 11th Panzer Division. Here he encountered his oldest son Hyacinth, who was serving with the 11th Panzer Division. Strachwitz started confiscating boats and barges in an attempt to cross the Danube. This work had begun when Strachwitz received the order to halt all activities. His unit was ordered to retreat to Timișoara. On 16 April Hube announced that the 16th Panzer Division would no longer be needed in the campaign and were ordered to regroup at Plovdiv. In early May 1941 Oberstleutnant Rudolf Sieckenius was given command of Panzer-Regiment 2, succeeding Oberst Hero Breusing. The entire 16th Panzer Division was ordered back to their home bases in Germany, with Panzer-Regiment 2 ordered to Ratibor—present-day Racibórz, where their equipment was overhauled. Strachwitz was awarded the Coroana României on 9 June 1941.

In mid-June 1941, the division received new orders to relocate. The 16th Panzer Division crossed the German-Polish border at Groß Wartenberg—present-day Syców, heading for Ożarów at the Vistula, which was reached on 19 June 1941. The German soldiers initially believed that they were just going to transit through Russia, on their way to the Middle East where they would link up with Erwin Rommel's Afrika Corps. But Generalfeldmarschall (Field Marshal) Walther von Reichenau, who visited his son, a Leutnant in the 4th company of Panzer-Regiment 2, revealed to them the true objective of the next campaign. It would be Operation Barbarossa, the invasion of the Soviet Union.

=== War against the Soviet Union ===
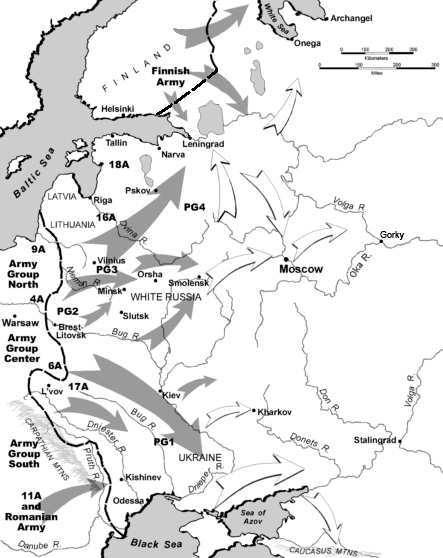
Arrow PG1 illustrates the main thrust of the 16th Panzer Division

The German offensive began at 3:30 on 22 June 1941 with an artillery strike against the Soviet Union. The 16th Panzer Division was subordinated to Heeresgruppe Süd (Army Group South) under the command of Generalfeldmarschall Von Rundstedt. The goal, together with the 6. Armee and 17. Armee as well as Panzergruppe I, was to follow the pincers of both armies, heading for Kiev and rolling up the Soviet flanks in the process, and finally encircling them at the Dnieper River. The main objective was to conquer the economically important Donets Basin as well as the oil field in the Caucasus.

German army reconnaissance aircraft spotted the first enemy formations in the vicinity of the 16th Panzer Division on the morning of 26 June. By this date the division had already progressed 125 kilometres (78 mi) beyond the German-Soviet demarcation line and had suffered numerous losses due to mechanical failures caused by the dusty roads. Panzer-Regiment 2 was ordered to engage the Soviet T-26 tanks which were supported by strong infantry units. In the resulting battle Strachwitz was hit and wounded in his left arm, his injury was bandaged and he remained with his unit. The heavy counter-attack was repulsed and the bridgehead over the Bug River, held by the division's motorcycle battalion (Kradschützen-Bataillon 16), was secured. Supplies were lagging behind and not before 28 June was his regiment resupplied. His unit first encountered the T-34 and a few KV-1 and KV-2 tanks the following day. These tanks had stronger armour and outgunned his Panzer III tanks. Only with the support of the 8.8 cm Flak artillery, deployed in an anti tank role, were they able to repulse the Soviet forces.

During the Battle of Uman (15 July – 8 August 1941) Strachwitz received injuries to the head on 29 July and was hit again by shrapnel in the arm the next day. He received first aid in the field and stayed with his men. The injuries to his arm became infected and he had to receive proper medical attention in a field hospital on 10 August. He released himself again on 12 August returning to regiment which had been led by Oberleutnant von Kleist during his absence. Strachwitz, charging his Panzer III ahead of his troops, engaged a Soviet supply convoy, destroying over three hundred soft-skinned vehicles and several Russian artillery batteries. Strachwitz was awarded the Knight's Cross of the Iron Cross for his part in this action on 25 August 1941. The presentation was made by Hube in the field on 5 September.

Following the Battle of Uman Panzer-Regiment 2 was given a rest. On 8 September the attack commenced again and crossed the Dnjepr on the night of 11/12 September. Together with the I. battalion of Schützen-Regiment 79 they started their attacked on Lubny and ambushed and destroyed a Soviet supply convoy. The attack on Lubny ended on 14 September. The Kiev pocket was sealed when panzers of the 3. Panzer-Division hooked up with Panzer-Regiment 2 on 15 September 1941. The spearhead of Panzergruppe 2, under Guderian and Panzergruppe 1, under Von Kleist had captured 50 Soviet Divisions. Panzer-Regiment 2 was then dispatched to prevent Soviet troops from escaping the pocket. For Panzer-Regiment 2 the battle of Kiev continued until 4 October 1941.

=== Towards Stalingrad ===
Strachwitz was promoted to Oberstleutnant (lieutenant colonel) of the Reserves on 1 January 1942. He had left the Eastern Front at the end of November 1941, returning home to receive treatment for the numerous injuries he had sustained over the year. From 1 December 1941 – 9 January 1942 he stayed at hospitals in Opplen and Breslau. He then went on an extended leave, staying in Groß Stein and Alt Siedel. He returned to the Eastern Front in mid-March 1942. Here he received the 1939 version of the Wound Badge in Silver on 17 March 1942.

Throughout the summer of 1942 Strachwitz led his tanks in the advance to the Don River and across it to Stalingrad. At Kalach on the Don his regiment destroyed more than 270 Soviet tanks within 48 hours. His unit was the first to reach the Volga River north of Stalingrad in October 1942. During this campaign, Strachwitz showed such a talent for commanding panzers that his troops nicknamed him der Panzergraf (the Armoured Count). By this time the 16th Panzer Division was assigned to General der Panzertruppe Friedrich Paulus' 6. Armee, which was encircled at Stalingrad the next month. By now, Strachwitz had been promoted to command the entire Panzer-Regiment 2. During one engagement on the northern flank of the Kessel, his unit destroyed 105 T-34s.

Strachwitz and his driver, Feldwebel Haase, were severely wounded on 13 October 1942, requiring immediate treatment in a field hospital. A direct hit on their command Panzer caused severe burns. Strachwitz had to hand over command of his I./Panzer-Regiment 2 to Hauptmann Bernd Freytag von Loringhoven. He then had to be flown out and was treated at a hospital at Breslau until 10 November 1942. He received further treatment at the Charité in Berlin from 11 to 18 November 1942. During this stay he received news that he had been awarded the 144th Oak Leaves to his Knight's Cross of the Iron Cross. He was ordered to the Führerhauptquartier in December 1942 for the presentation of the Oak Leaves by Hitler himself. He then went to Bad Gastein for a period of convalescence before spending his vacation at home in Alt Siedel. Strachwitz was promoted to Oberst (colonel) of the Reserves on 1 January 1943. He then learned that Hube had been ordered to the Führerhauptquartier for the presentation of the Oak Leaves to the Knight's Cross of the Iron Cross. Strachwitz took the opportunity and reported to Hube, volunteering for service in the Stalingrad pocket. Hube rejected this request, stating that Strachwitz would be better deployed somewhere else.

=== Großdeutschland Panzer-Regiment ===
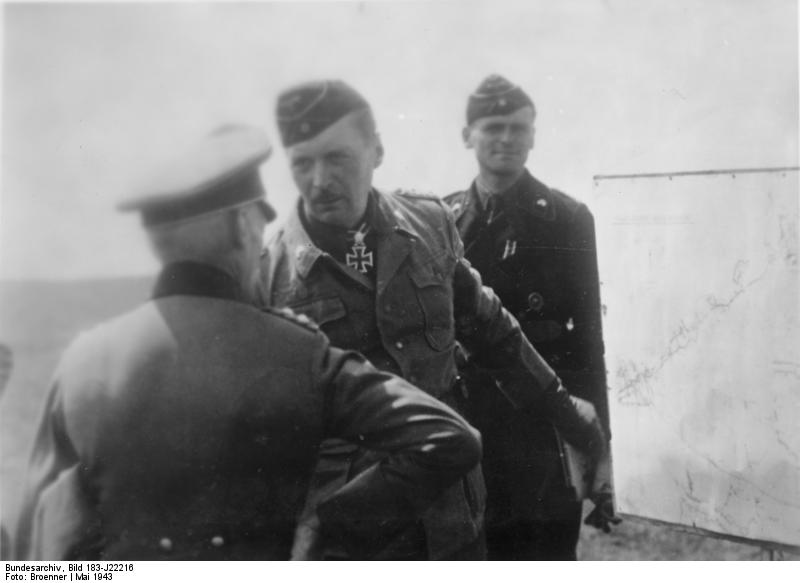
Strachwitz near Kharkov, May 1943

At the end of January 1943 Strachwitz was ordered to the Führerhauptquartier. Talking to General Rudolf Schmundt and Kurt Zeitzler, the Chief of Staff of the Oberkommando des Heeres, he was tasked with the creation of the Panzerregiment "Großdeutschland". The regiment was subordinated to the Infantrie-Division (motorized) "Großdeutschland" then under the command of Generalmajor Walter Hörnlein. He led the regiment when it took part in the Third Battle of Kharkov, fighting alongside SS-Gruppenführer Paul Hausser's II SS Panzer Corps. Strachwitz was awarded the Wound Badge in Gold on 16 February 1943 and on 28 March 1943 the Swords to his Knight's Cross of the Iron Cross with Oak Leaves. He received the latter for his leadership at Kharkov and Belgorod and the destruction of 154 enemy tanks. He received the award together with Georg-Wilhelm Postel who had been awarded the Oak Leaves to his Knight's Cross of the Iron Cross on this day.

On 5 July 1943, the first day of Operation Citadel (5–16 July 1943), the German code name for the Battle of Kursk, in the Großdeutschland area of operations, the Panther battalion got bogged down in the mud near Beresowyj and failed to support the Füsilier's attack. Nipe indicates that often Oberst Karl Decker and Oberstleutnant Meinrad von Lauchert have been made responsible for this failure. However, Nipe argues "that it can safely be assumed that Strachwitz was present; thus, any responsibility regarding actions of Großdeutschland's Panzers belongs to the Panzer Count." Following the battle, Decker wrote a letter to Guderian complaining about the unnecessary losses suffered by the Großdeutschland division. In this letter Decker stated, that how Strachwitz led his tanks on the first day of Kursk must be characterized as "idiotic". Strachwitz was wounded again on 10 July. His battle group had been ordered into combat by Hörnlein. The objective was to capture Hill 258.4, about 4 kilometres (2.5 mi) west of Werchopenje. The battle group encountered roughly 30 Soviet tanks on evening of 9 July. An attack proved unfeasible due to the settling darkness. During these events he received news that his son, Hyacinth, had been severely wounded. At dusk on 10 July he ordered the attack on the Soviet tanks. The first T-34s had been destroyed and Strachwitz was directing the attack from his command Panzer and had ordered his gunner to hold fire. Strachwitz was carelessly resting his left arm on the gun-breech. The gunner, without orders, fired the gun, causing the recoiling gun to smash his left arm. Strachwitz was immediately evacuated to a field hospital. Strachwitz's arm was put in a cast and against medical advice returned to his regiment. When Hörnlein learned of this he went furious and gave Strachwitz a direct order to return to the field hospital.

In November 1943, Strachwitz left the "Großdeutschland" on grounds of ill-health, he had again been wounded in his left arm. Alternatively tension between him and the division's commander Hörnlein is thought by many veterans to be the true reason for Strachwitz's departure. Otto Carius stated that:

"Gossip mongers maintained that the Großdeutschland Panzer-Regiment was taken away from Strachwitz because he had too many losses. I had justifiable doubts concerning this claim. Graf Strachwitz and his staff were always employed at hot spots on the front, where they had to carry out extremely pressing operations, for which every form of support was provided to them. Painful losses couldn't always be avoided during those types of operations. But it was through these losses that the lives of many soldiers from other units were saved."

=== Battle for the Narva Bridgehead ===
The severe injury to Strachwitz's left arm had forced him to retire from the front line. After a stay in the hospital at Breslau and a period of convalescence at home he received a teleprinter message commanding him as "Höheren Panzerführer" (higher tank commander) to the Army Group North. Strachwitz reported to the commander-in-chief of the 18th Army, Generaloberst Georg Lindemann, who was tasked with the leadership of Army Group North.

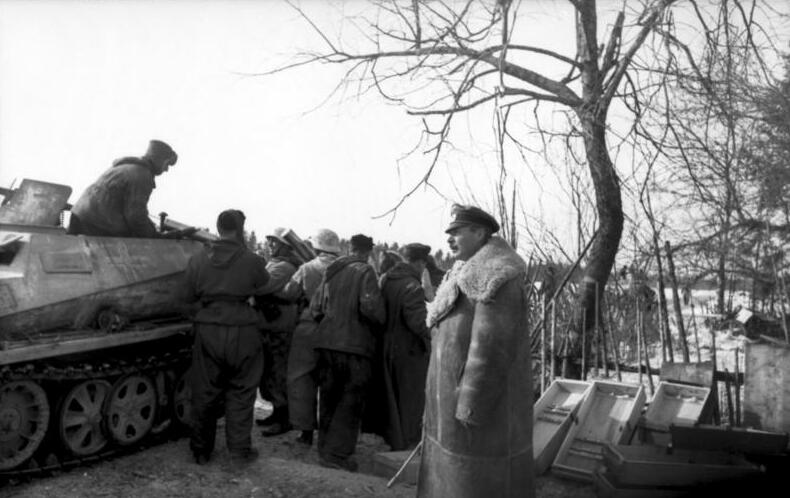
Strachwitz with fellow soldiers prior to the offensive, 21 March 1944

On 26 March 1944, the Strachwitz Battle Group consisting of the German 170th, 11th, and 227th Infantry Divisions and tanks, attacked the flanks of the Soviet 109th Rifle Corps south of the Tallinn railway, supported by an air strike. The tanks led the attack and the East Prussian grenadiers followed, penetrating the fortified positions of the Soviet rifle corps. By the end of the day, the Soviet 72nd and parts of the 109th Rifle Corps in the Westsack (west sack) of the bridgehead were encircled. The rest of the Soviet rifle corps retreated, shooting the local civilians who had been used for carrying ammunition and supplies from the rear.

As Strachwitz had predicted, the rifle corps counterattacked on the following day. It was repelled by the 23rd East Prussian Grenadier Regiment which inflicted heavy casualties on the Soviets. Two small groups of tanks broke through the lines of the rifle corps on 28 March in several places, splitting the bridgehead in two. Fierce air combat followed, with 41 German dive bombers shot down. The west half of the bridgehead was destroyed by 31 March, with an estimated 6,000 Soviet casualties.

The Ostsack (east sack) of the Krivasoo bridgehead, defended by the Soviet 6th and the 117th Rifle Corps, were confused by the Strachwitz Battle Group's diversionary attack on 6 April. The attack deceived the Soviet forces into thinking that the German attack intended to cut them out from the west flank. The actual assault came directly at the 59th Army and started with a heavy bombardment. The positions of the 59th Army were attacked by dive bombers and the forest there was set afire. At the same time, the 61st Infantry Division and the Strachwitz tank squadron pierced deep into the 59th Army's defences, splitting the two rifle corps apart and forcing them to retreat to their fortifications. Marshal of the Soviet Union Leonid Govorov was outraged by the news, sending in the freshly re-deployed 8th Army. Their attempt to cut off the Tiger I tanks was repelled by Lieutenant Günther Famula, who received a posthumous Knight's Cross for these actions, keeping their supply lines open. On 7 April, Govorov ordered his troops to switch on to the defensive. The 59th Army, having lost another 5,700 troops from all causes, was withdrawn from the bridgehead. For these successes Strachwitz received the Knight's Cross with Oak Leaves, Swords, and Diamonds on 15 April 1944. News of the award had reached his headquarters on the early morning of 15 April via teleprinter message. Against orders, his jubilant adjutant, Unteroffizier Rosenstock, woke him up on the early morning to share the news. The official presentation was made a few weeks later by Hitler.

The advance brought the Strachwitz Battle Group hope of destroying the entire bridgehead. However, the spring thaw meant that the tanks were impossible to use. The 8th Army repelled the German attack, which lasted from 19 to 24 April. The Germans lost 2,235 troops, dead and captured, in the offensive, while the total of German casualties in April, from all causes, was 13,274. Soviet casualties in April are unknown, but are estimated by Mart Laar to be at least 30,000 men from all causes. The losses exhausted the strengths of both sides. The front subsequently stagnated with the exception of artillery, air, and sniper activity and clashes between reconnaissance platoons for the next several months.

=== Final battles ===
Strachwitz led an ad-hoc formation in Operation Doppelkopf (double-head) as part of Dietrich von Saucken's XXXIX Panzer Corps counter-offensive following the major Soviet advance in Operation Bagration. Von Saucken's goal was to relieve the encircled forces in the Courland Pocket. Strachwitz's attack on 18 August was preceded by a heavy artillery bombardment from the heavy cruiser Prinz Eugen; forces inside the pocket attacked to link up with Strachwitz's force. His troops reached the 16. Armee at Tukums by midday.

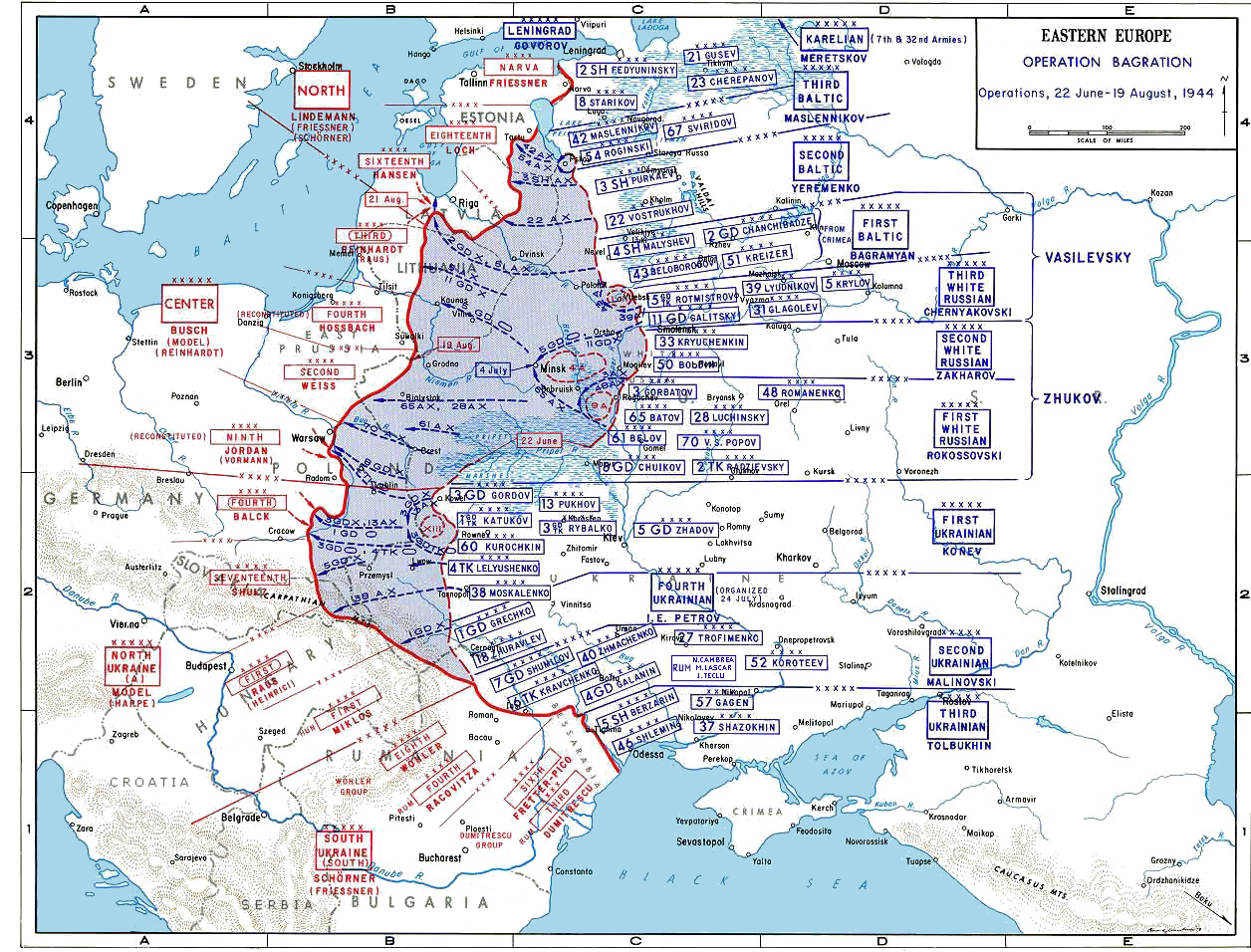
Eastern Front, June–August 1944. The attack at the connection between Army Groups Centre (3rd Panzer Army) and North (16th Army) west of Riga is marked.

During a visit to a division command post on 24 August 1944 Strachwitz was badly injured in an automobile accident. The vehicle rolled over and the other occupants were killed. He sustained a fractured skull, and broken ribs, legs, arms and hands, and his survival was in doubt. He was immediately taken to a field hospital, then was transferred to a hospital at Riga. He was then flown to Breslau in a Junkers Ju 52 for further treatment, where he was visited by his son Harti. The doctors informed him that it would take him eight months to recover fully. Refusing to accept this, and showing tremendous willpower, he worked out his own rehabilitation therapy:

1. day: practice sitting up and lying back down until he could do it unassisted
2. day: hang legs over side of bed
3. day: walk on crutches to wash basin
4. day: take a bath with assistance
5. day: walk to door on crutches
6. day: extended walking
7. day: leave hospital

Strachwitz signed himself out of the hospital, officially having himself transferred to the hospital at Oppeln. On the drive back he lost consciousness at almost every turn, arriving at his manor in Alt Siedel on 28 November 1944. Here he convalesced until 23 December 1944.

The Red Army started the Vistula–Oder Offensive on 12 January 1945. The attack began with an intense bombardment by the guns of the 1st Ukrainian Front against elements of Army Group A, initially under the command of Generaloberst Josef Harpe. Within a matter of days the Soviet forces involved had advanced hundreds of kilometres, taking much of Poland and striking deep within the borders of the Reich. The offensive broke Army Group A, and much of Germany's remaining capacity for military resistance. The Soviet forces crossed the Silesian border on 19 January and Harpe was relieved of his command and replaced by Generaloberst Ferdinand Schörner on 20 January. Schörner established his headquarters at Oppeln. Here Strachwitz, on crutches, went to see Schörner, requesting a front command to defend his homeland. Schörner declined the offer and Strachwitz insisted on another assignment. Bending to the request, Schörner initially kept him in his staff where Strachwitz conceived the plan of creating a specialized Panzerjagdbrigade (tank-hunting brigade). The 3rd Guards Tank Army conquered Oppeln and Groß Strehlitz on 23 January 1945. The following day Groß Stein fell into the hands of the advancing Red Army and Strachwitz's palace and entire estate were confiscated. Schörner yielded to the demands of Strachwitz, and authorized the creation of the Panzerjägerbrigade. These brigades were not mechanized units but rather infantry soldiers deploying hand-held weapons such as the Panzerfaust. On 30 January 1945, he was promoted to Generalleutnant of the Reserves and organized his staff of the Panzerjäger-Brigade Oberschlesien at Bad Kudova—present-day Kudowa-Zdrój in Kłodzko Land.

The offices of his staff searched for volunteers in the Unteroffiziersschulen (non-commissioned officers schools) and supplementary units. They were able to bring together roughly 8,000 volunteers, mostly from the threatened territories of Pomerania, East Prussia and Silesia. Strachwitz' tactics quickly made news within the Wehrmacht, and even Generalfeldmarschall Albert Kesselring, Commander-in-Chief, West as of 11 March 1945, expressed an interest. Strachwitz subsequently had one of his officers transferred to Kesselring's staff.

Following a visit of the commander of the Panzerjagdverbände (tank-hunting detachment) of Army Group Vistula, Oberst Ernst-Wilhelm Freiherr Gedult von Jungenfeld, all of the Panzerjagdverbände were to be centralized under Strachwitz' command. In April the Panzerjagdeinheiten (tank-hunting units) of Army Group Centre were all put under his command, this included Panzerjagdverbände A, B and C (Wehrkreis VIII), the Heeres-Panzerjagdbrigaden 1 and 3, two Volkssturm-Panzerjagdbrigaden and the Panzerjäger-Brigade Niederschlesien (Lower Silesia) and Free Ukrainians. Strachwitz deployed his men in small combat groups, sometimes operating behind enemy lines, which lured enemy tanks into traps and attacked them with Panzerfausts. Combat reached its peak in April 1945, and some of his men were credited with more than ten enemy tanks destroyed each. The German front line of Army Group Centre at the time was in mid-Silesia along the Zobten, and via Schweidnitz and Jauer to Lauban. The main Soviet thrust was targeted for Berlin and Dresden, threatening the German troops in Silesia with encirclement. Strachwitz and his men fought under the command of Schörner until the German capitulation on 8 May 1945.

Strachwitz led his men in a successful breakout from the Russian encirclement in Czechoslovakia to the U.S.-held region of Bavaria, where they surrendered to U.S. Army forces near Felgen. (Note: Röll explicitly mentions the location "Felgen". It is unclear what place is meant by "Felgen". It could be Auf den Folgen near Všemily, Jetřichovice or Velden.) Strachwitz was taken to the prisoner of war camp at Allendorf near Marburg, where he was interned together with Franz Halder, Guderian and Adolf Galland.

== A member of the German resistance? ==
Peter Hoffmann, a Canadian historian of German descent, published a book in 1969 with the title "Widerstand, Staatsstreich, Attentat — Der Kampf der Opposition gegen Hitler" [Resistance, Coup d'etat, Assassination — The Battle of the Opposition against Hitler]. This work lists Strachwitz as being part of the German military resistance to Nazism. With Generals Hubert Lanz, Hans Speidel and Paul Loehning he is shown as being associated with "Plan Lanz". But the only person to have testified that a "Plan Lanz" ever existed was General der Gebirgstruppe Hubert Lanz. According to Lanz, the plan was to arrest or kill Hitler in early February 1943 during Hitler's scheduled visit to Armeeabteilung Lanz. In his account, the role of Strachwitz was to surround Hitler and his escorts shortly after Hitler's arrival with his tanks. Lanz stated that he would have then arrested Hitler, and in the event of resistance, Strachwitz's tanks would have shot and killed the entire delegation. Hitler cancelled the visit and the plan was dropped. Author Röll casts doubt on this account. Strachwitz's cousin, Rudolf Christoph Freiherr von Gersdorff, who attempted to assassinate Hitler in 1943, stated that Strachwitz had expressed the belief to him several times that killing Hitler would have constituted murder. Röll concludes that Strachwitz was too much a Prussian officer to consider murdering Hitler.

== After World War II and final years ==
Strachwitz was released by the Allies in June 1947. He had lost his wife, his youngest son and his estate during the war. Alda was killed in a traffic accident on 6 January 1946, run over by a US military truck in Velden an der Vils. Strachwitz, still a US prisoner of war in camp Allendorf near Marburg, was denied permission to attend the funeral. Harti, who had lost a leg, was killed in action shortly before the end of the war on 25 March 1945 near Holstein. Strachwitz married again on 30 July 1947 in Holzhausen. With his new wife Nora, née von Stumm (1916–2000), he had four children, two daughters and two sons, born between 1951 and 1960.

He and wife accepted the invitation of Husni al-Za'im to come to Syria as an agricultural and military advisor to the Syrian Armed Forces. This he did from January–June 1949, a period during the 1948 Arab–Israeli War (15 May 1948 – 10 March 1949), in which Syria fought. The influential man behind Husni al-Za'im was Adib Shishakli, who wanted a Pan-Arabian revolution and was trying to run the state from behind the scenes. Seeing himself as a state-maker, the Otto von Bismarck of the Arabian peoples, Shishakli's goal was to transform Syria into a kind of "Prussian Arabia". He owned a Mercedes car which had once belonged to Adolf Hitler. Under his leadership, Syria brought over 30 advisors to Syria. Strachwitz, bragging about his military successes in Russia, had a very difficult time with the Syrian officers, and his agricultural suggestions were ignored as well. When Adib Shishakli seized power, Strachwitz and his wife left Syria. In the meantime, they had received a visa for Argentina, where they hoped to find another advisory position. Via Lebanon, they arrived in Livorno, Italy, where they changed their plans and ran a winery. They returned to Germany in 1951 with a Red Cross passport. He settled on an estate in Winkl near Grabenstätt in Bavaria and founded the "Oberschlesisches Hilfswerk" (Upper Silesian Fund) supporting fellow Silesians in need.

Strachwitz lived out his final years quietly and died on 25 April 1968 of lung cancer in hospital in Trostberg. Der Panzergraf was laid to rest in the village cemetery of Grabenstätt, beside his first wife. The Bundeswehr provided an honour guard as a mark of respect. Heinz-Georg Lemm delivered the eulogy.

== Summary of career ==
=== Awards ===
- Iron Cross (1914)
  - 2nd Class (1914)
  - 1st Class (1914)
- Silesian Eagle 2nd and 1st Class with Oak Leaves and Swords (1921)
- Clasp to the Iron Cross (1939)
  - 2nd Class (5 October 1939)
  - 1st Class (7 June 1940)
- Deutsches Reichssportabzeichen (1941)
- Order of the Crown (Romania) (9 June 1941)
- Panzer Badge
  - in Silver (1941)
  - in Gold with engagement numeral "100" (1943/1944)
- Eastern Front Medal (August 1942)
- Wound Badge (1939)
  - in Black (1941)
  - in Silver (17 March 1942)
  - in Gold (16 February 1943)
- Knight's Cross of the Iron Cross with Oak Leaves, Swords and Diamonds
  - Knight's Cross on 25 August 1941 as Major of the Reserves and commander of the I./Panzer-Regiment 2
  - 144th Oak Leaves on 13 November 1942 as Oberstleutnant of the Reserves and commander of the I./Panzer-Regiment 2
  - 27th Swords on 28 March 1943 as Oberst of the Reserves and commander of the Panzer-Regiment "Großdeutschland"
  - 11th Diamonds on 15 April 1944 as Oberst of the Reserves and commander of a Panzer-Gruppe with the Heeresgruppe Nord
- Units under his command have been mentioned numerous times in the Wehrmachtbericht

Strachwitz is often credited with the German Cross in Gold awarded on 29 May 1943, this however was awarded to his son, also named Hyacinth, who received this award as Oberleutnant in the 4./Panzer-Regiment 15.

=== Promotions ===
| 17 February 1914: | Leutnant (Second Lieutenant) |
| 1921: | Oberleutnant (First Lieutenant), effective as 1916 |
| 9 August 1933: | SS-Mann |
| 15 September 1933: | SS-Scharführer |
| 19 December 1933: | SS-Truppführer (Troop Leader) |
| 10 March 1934: | SS-Obertruppführer |
| 28 April 1934: | SS-Untersturmführer |
| 9 November 1934: | SS-Obersturmführer |
| 1934: | Hauptmann (Captain) of the Reserves |
| 15 September 1935: | SS-Hauptsturmführer |
| 1935: | Rittmeister (Cavalry Master) of the Reserves |
| 13 September 1936: | SS-Sturmbannführer |
| 30 January 1939: | SS-Obersturmbannführer |
| 1940: | Major (Major) of the Reserves |
| 1 January 1942: | Oberstleutnant (Lieutenant Colonel) of the Reserves |
| 1 January 1943: | Oberst (Colonel) of the Reserves |
| 3 November 1943: | SS-Standartenführer, effective as 1 September 1943 |
| 1 April 1944: | Generalmajor (Major General) of the Reserves |
| 30 January 1945: | Generalleutnant (Lieutenant General) of the Reserves |
