= Gumpert =

Gumpert is a surname and may refer to:

- Ben Gumpert (born 1963), English barrister
- Dave Gumpert (born 1958), American baseball player
- Friedrich Gumpert (1841–1906), German horn player and teacher
- Martin Gumpert (1897–1955), Jewish German-born American physician and writer
- Randy Gumpert (1918–2008), American professional baseball pitcher, manager, scout and coach.
- Roland Gumpert (born 1944), German engineer
- Thomas Gumpert (1952—2021), German actor

Gumpert may also refer to:

- Gumpert Sportwagenmanufaktur, previous name of sports car manufacturer Apollo Automobil
