= Max Hess =

Max Hess may refer to:

- Max Hess (musician) (1878–1975), German horn player
- Max Hess (gymnast) (1877–1969), American gymnast and track and field athlete
- Max Hess (athlete) (born 1996), German triple jumper
