= Nowa Wieś, Gmina Kłobuck =

Nowa Wieś
- Village
- Location within Poland
- Coordinates: 50°55′16″N 19°3′18″E
- Country: Poland
- Voivodeship: Silesian
- County: Kłobuck
- Gmina: Kłobuck
- Population: 332

Nowa Wieś [ˈnɔva ˈvjɛɕ] is a village in the administrative district of Gmina Kłobuck, within Kłobuck County, Silesian Voivodeship, in southern Poland.
