= Rybno, Silesian Voivodeship =

Rybno
- Village
- Location within Poland
- Coordinates: 50°53′32″N 18°52′13″E
- Country: Poland
- Voivodeship: Silesian
- County: Kłobuck
- Gmina: Kłobuck
- Population: 177

Rybno [ˈrɨbnɔ] is a village in the administrative district of Gmina Kłobuck, within Kłobuck County, Silesian Voivodeship, in southern Poland.
