= Borowianka =

- Village
- Location within Poland
- Coordinates: 50°54′N 19°2′E
- Country: Poland
- Voivodeship: Silesian
- County: Kłobuck
- Gmina: Kłobuck
- Population: 468

Borowianka [bɔrɔˈvjanka] is a village in the administrative district of Gmina Kłobuck, within Kłobuck County, Silesian Voivodeship, in southern Poland.
