= Mason Jones (hornist) =

American horn player and music educator (1919–2009)

Mason Jones (16 June 1919, Hamilton, New York – 18 February 2009, Wynnewood, Pennsylvania) was an American horn player and music educator who had a lengthy association with the Philadelphia Orchestra as principal hornist under conductor Eugene Ormandy. He also served as principal hornist of the United States Marine Band during World War II and was the head of the horn faculty at the Curtis Institute of Music from 1946–1995. He was a founding member of the Philadelphia Woodwind Quintet and the Philadelphia Brass Ensemble.

== Life and career ==
Born in Hamilton, New York, Jones began his professional studies in 1936 at the Curtis Institute of Music as a pupil of Anton Horner. In 1938 he was hired by Ormandy as third horn for the Philadelphia Orchestra and a year later replaced his teacher as the orchestra's solo hornist. In 1940 he was appointed principal hornist of the Philadelphia Orchestra, a position he vacated a year later to serve as principal hornist of the United States Marine Band from 1941–1946.

In 1947 Jones returned to the Philadelphia Orchestra as principal hornist, this time serving in that position until his retirement 31 years later in 1978. He concurrently served as the orchestra's personnel manager from 1963–1986. Among the many recordings he made with the Philadelphia Orchestra was the music for the 1940 Disney animation film Fantasia.

== Discography ==
=== Recordings as featured soloist ===
- Eugene Ormandy Conducts Mozart Wind Concertos – with Philadelphia Orchestra; Eugene Ormandy, conductor (RCA 886446061184)
- Hindemith: Sonatas for Brass and Piano – with Glenn Gould, piano (Sony)

=== Chamber music recordings ===
- Mozart & Beethoven: Quintets for Piano & Winds – with Rudolf Serkin, piano (Sony 827969390924)
- Poulenc: Sextet for Piano and Winds etc. - with the composer himself (Boston Records BR10G1CD) The Original Philadelphia Woodwind Quintet
