= Lgota, Silesian Voivodeship =

Lgota
- Village
- Location within Poland
- Coordinates: 50°51′31″N 19°1′39″E
- Country: Poland
- Voivodeship: Silesian
- County: Kłobuck
- Gmina: Kłobuck
- Population: 522

Lgota [ˈlɡɔta] is a village in the administrative district of Gmina Kłobuck, within Kłobuck County, Silesian Voivodeship, in southern Poland.
