= Kopiec, Silesian Voivodeship =

Kopiec
- Village
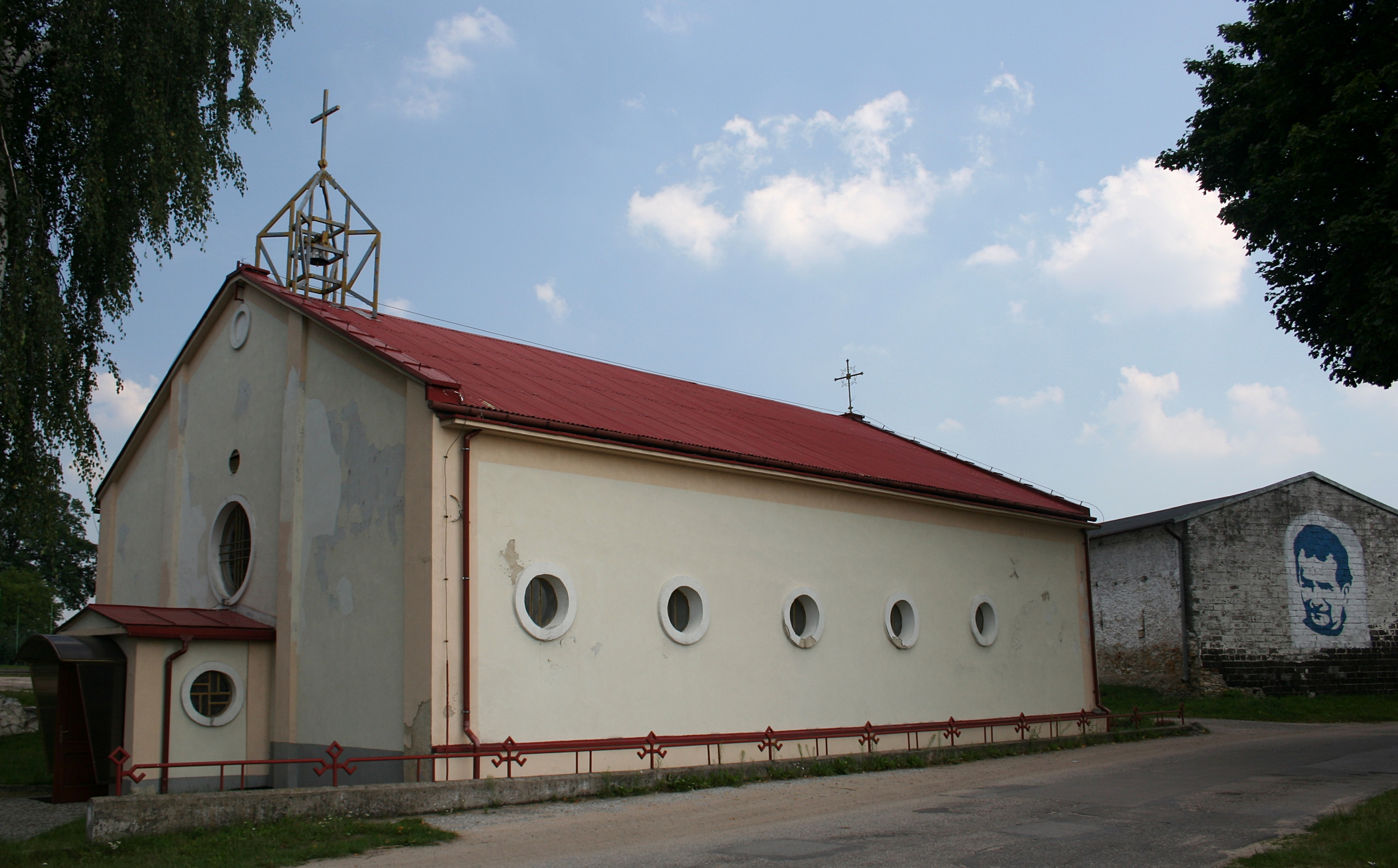

- Location within Poland
- Coordinates: 50°54′N 19°3′E
- Country: Poland
- Voivodeship: Silesian
- County: Kłobuck
- Gmina: Kłobuck
- Population: 217

Kopiec [ˈkɔpjɛt͡s] is a village in the administrative district of Gmina Kłobuck, within Kłobuck County, Silesian Voivodeship, in southern Poland.
