= Anton Horner =

American horn player (1877–1971)

- Born: June 21, 1877; Gossengrün, Bohemia, Austria-Hungary
- Died: December 4, 1971 (aged 94) Springfield, Pennsylvania, U.S.
- Genres: Classical
- Occupation: Musician
- Instrument: Horn
- Years active: 1899–1946
- Formerly of: Pittsburgh Symphony, Sousa Band, Philadelphia Orchestra

Anton Horner (June 21, 1877 – December 4, 1971) was an American horn player. He was part of the Philadelphia Orchestra for 44 years and served for 28 years as its solo horn player. He is credited for introducing the double horn to the United States.

== Biography ==
Horner was born in Gossengrün, Bohemia, part of Austria-Hungary (now Krajková in the Czech Republic) in 1877. He studied under Friedrich Gumpert at the Leipzig Conservatory. After coming to the United States, he joined the Pittsburgh Symphony led by Victor Herbert in 1899. He toured Europe in 1900 with the Sousa Band. From 1902 until his retirement in 1946, Horner performed with the Philadelphia Orchestra, whose director Eugene Ormandy later called him "not only one of the greatest horn players of his time, but of all time”. Horner also taught for many years at the Curtis Institute of Music. Among his many accomplished pupils was Mason Jones.

== Personal life and death ==
From July 2, 1903, until her death on July 19, 1962, Horner was married to the former Alice Elizabeth Roeth.

Horner died in Springfield, Pennsylvania, on December 4, 1971, at age 94.
