= Kamyk, Silesian Voivodeship =

Kamyk
- Village
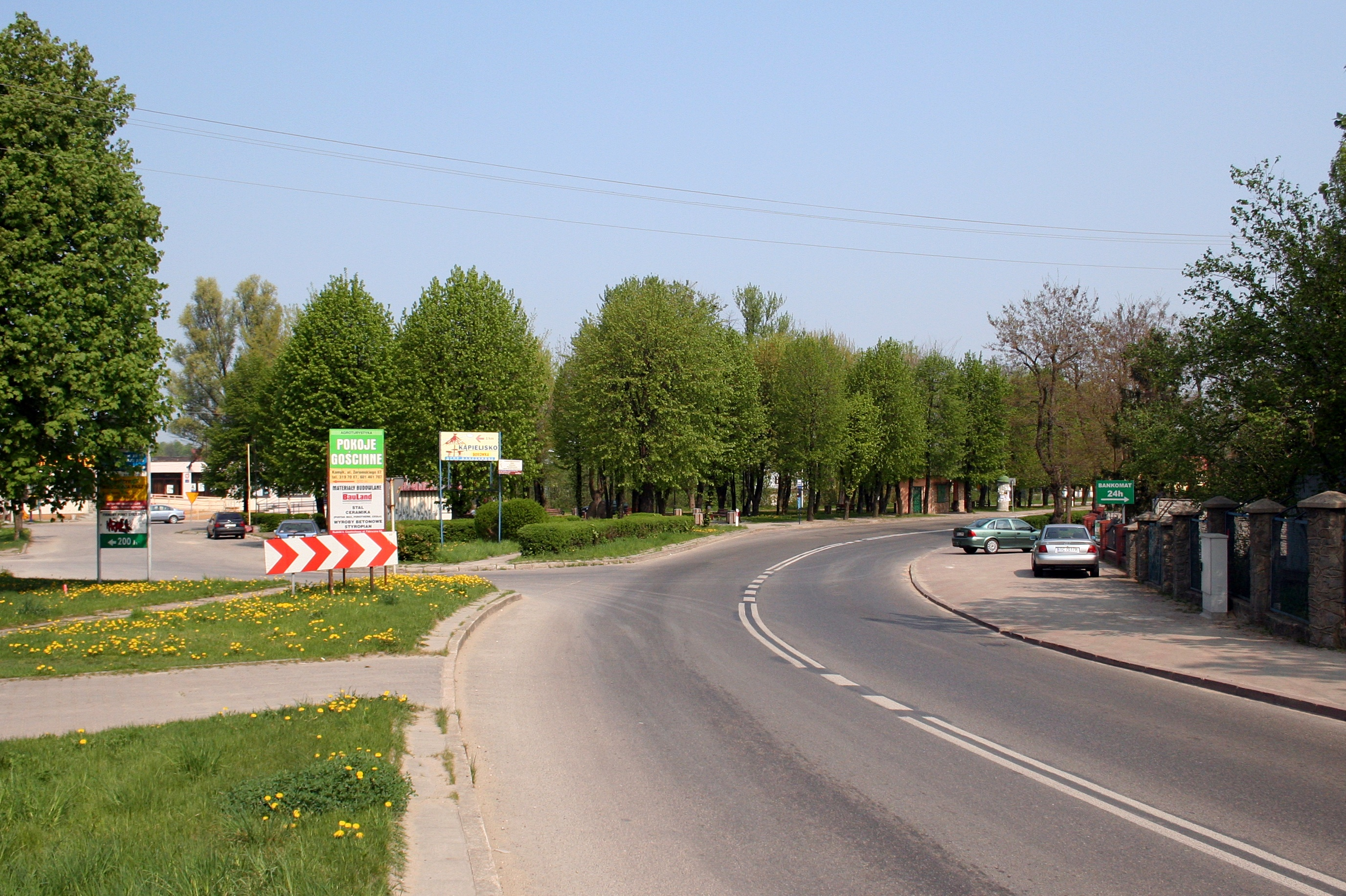

- Location within Poland
- Coordinates: 50°54′5″N 19°1′40″E
- Country: Poland
- Voivodeship: Silesian
- County: Kłobuck
- Gmina: Kłobuck
- Population: 1,245

Kamyk [ˈkamɨk] is a village in the administrative district of Gmina Kłobuck, within Kłobuck County, Silesian Voivodeship, in southern Poland.
