= Gmina Kłobuck =

Gmina Kłobuck Kłobuck Commune
- Gmina
- Coat of arms
- Interactive map of Gmina Kłobuck
- Coordinates (Kłobuck): 50°55′N 18°56′E
- Country: Poland
- Voivodeship: Silesian
- County: Kłobuck
- Seat: Kłobuck

Area
  - Total: 130.4 km^{2} (50.3 sq mi)

Population (2019-06-30)
  - Total: 20,412
  - Density: 156.5/km^{2} (405.4/sq mi)
  - Urban: 12,934
  - Rural: 7,478
- Website: https://www.gminaklobuck.pl/

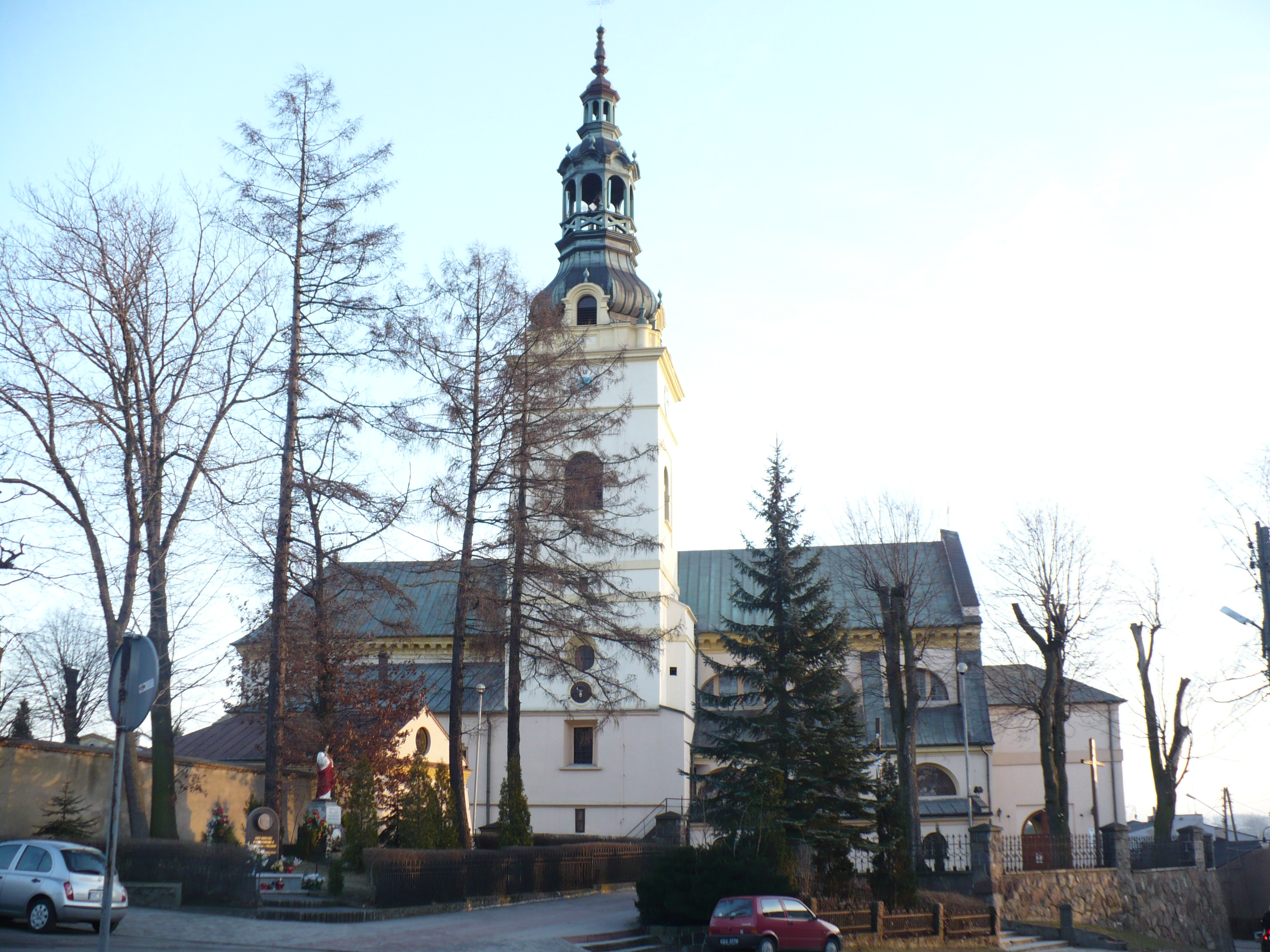
St Marcin and Małgorzata Church in Kłobuck

Gmina Kłobuck is an urban-rural gmina (administrative district) in Kłobuck County, Silesian Voivodeship, in southern Poland. Its seat is the town of Kłobuck, which lies approximately 75 kilometres (47 mi) north of the regional capital Katowice.

The gmina covers an area of 130.4 square kilometres (50.3 sq mi), and as of 2019 its total population is 20,412.

== Villages ==
Apart from the town of Kłobuck, Gmina Kłobuck contains the villages and settlements of Biała Dolna, Biała Górna, Borowianka, Gruszewnia, Kamyk, Kopiec, Lgota, Libidza, Łobodno, Nowa Wieś and Rybno.

== Neighbouring gminas ==
Gmina Kłobuck is bordered by the city of Częstochowa and by the gminas of Miedźno, Mykanów, Opatów and Wręczyca Wielka.

== Twin towns – sister cities ==
Gmina Kłobuck is twinned with:

- Štúrovo, Slovakia
