= Biała Dolna =

- Village
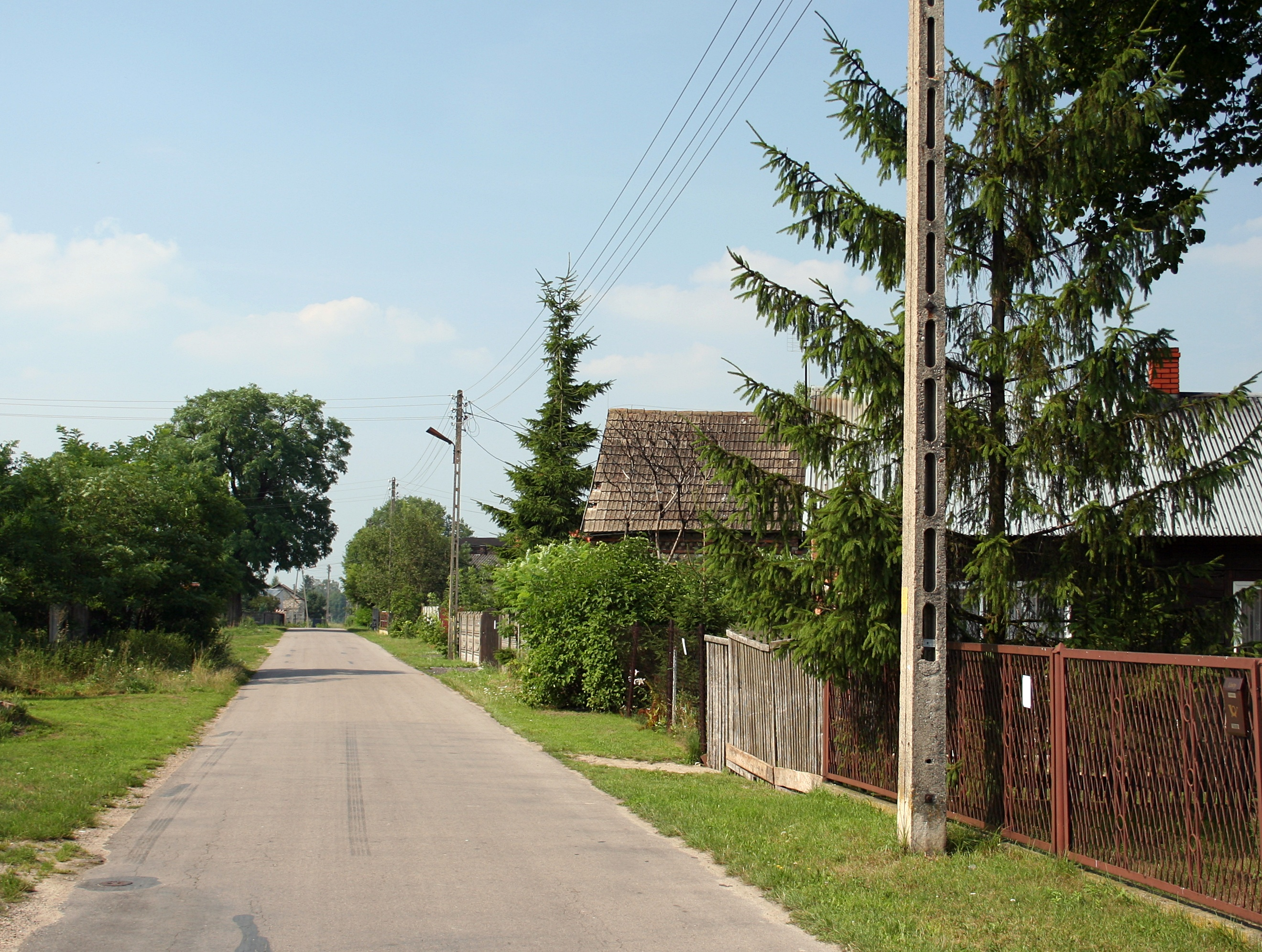

- Location within Poland
- Coordinates: 50°52′17″N 19°3′27″E
- Country: Poland
- Voivodeship: Silesian
- County: Kłobuck
- Gmina: Kłobuck
- Population: 823

Biała Dolna [ˈbjawa ˈdɔlna] is a village in the administrative district of Gmina Kłobuck, within Kłobuck County, Silesian Voivodeship, in southern Poland.
