= Libidza =

- Village
- Location within Poland
- Coordinates: 50°53′0″N 18°59′11″E
- Country: Poland
- Voivodeship: Silesian
- County: Kłobuck
- Gmina: Kłobuck
- Population: 711

Libidza [liˈbid͡za] is a village in the administrative district of Gmina Kłobuck, within Kłobuck County, Silesian Voivodeship, in southern Poland.
