= Gruszewnia =

- Village
- Location within Poland
- Coordinates: 50°52′9″N 19°0′39″E
- Country: Poland
- Voivodeship: Silesian
- County: Kłobuck
- Gmina: Kłobuck
- Population: 2,137

Gruszewnia [ɡruˈʂɛvɲa] is a village in the administrative district of Gmina Kłobuck, within Kłobuck County, Silesian Voivodeship, in southern Poland.
