= Biała Górna =

- Village
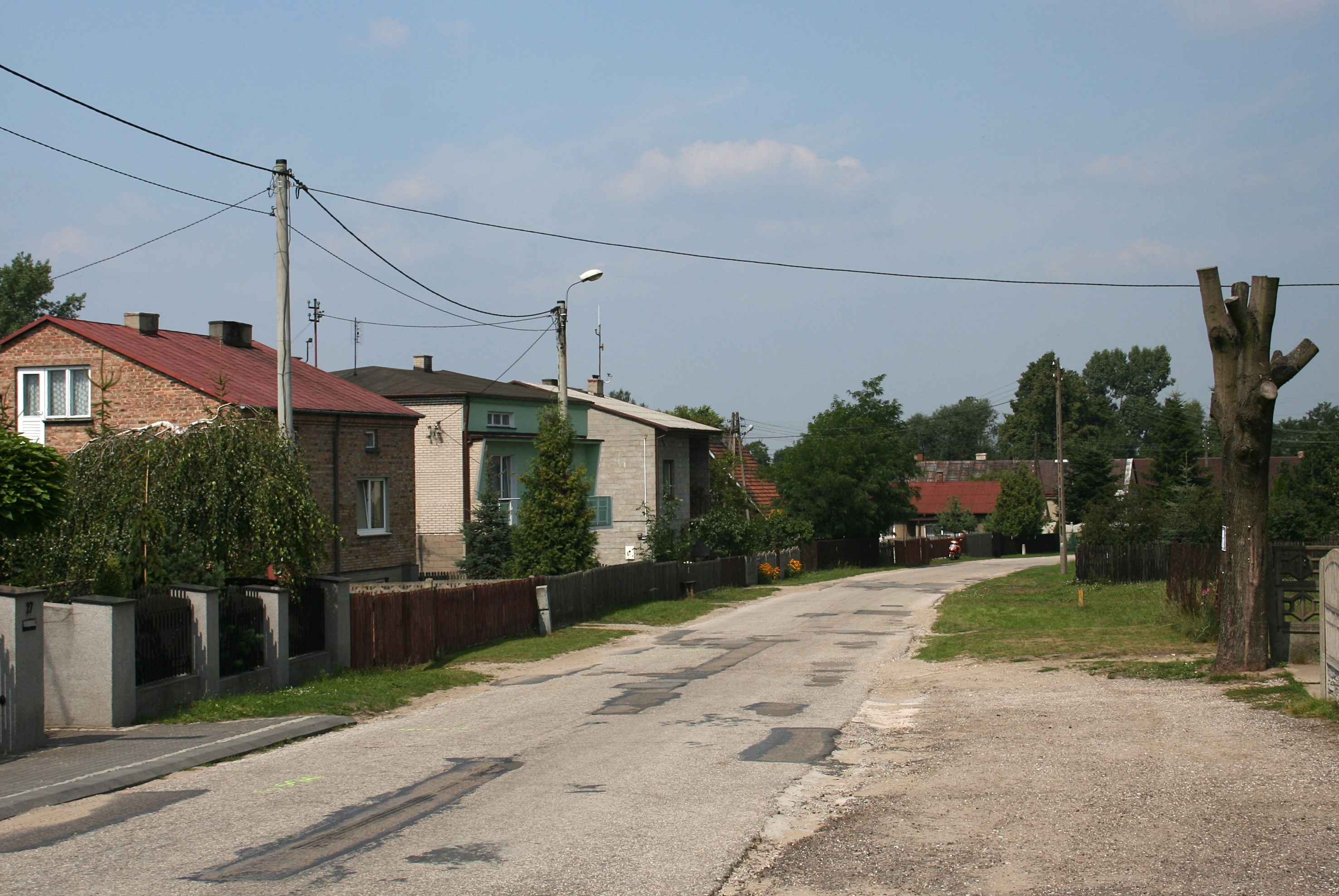
- Road in the village

- Location within Poland
- Coordinates: 50°53′11″N 19°3′35″E
- Country: Poland
- Voivodeship: Silesian
- County: Kłobuck
- Gmina: Kłobuck
- Population: 617

Biała Górna [ˈbjawa ˈɡurna] is a village in the administrative district of Gmina Kłobuck, within Kłobuck County, Silesian Voivodeship, in southern Poland.
