= Kłobuck =

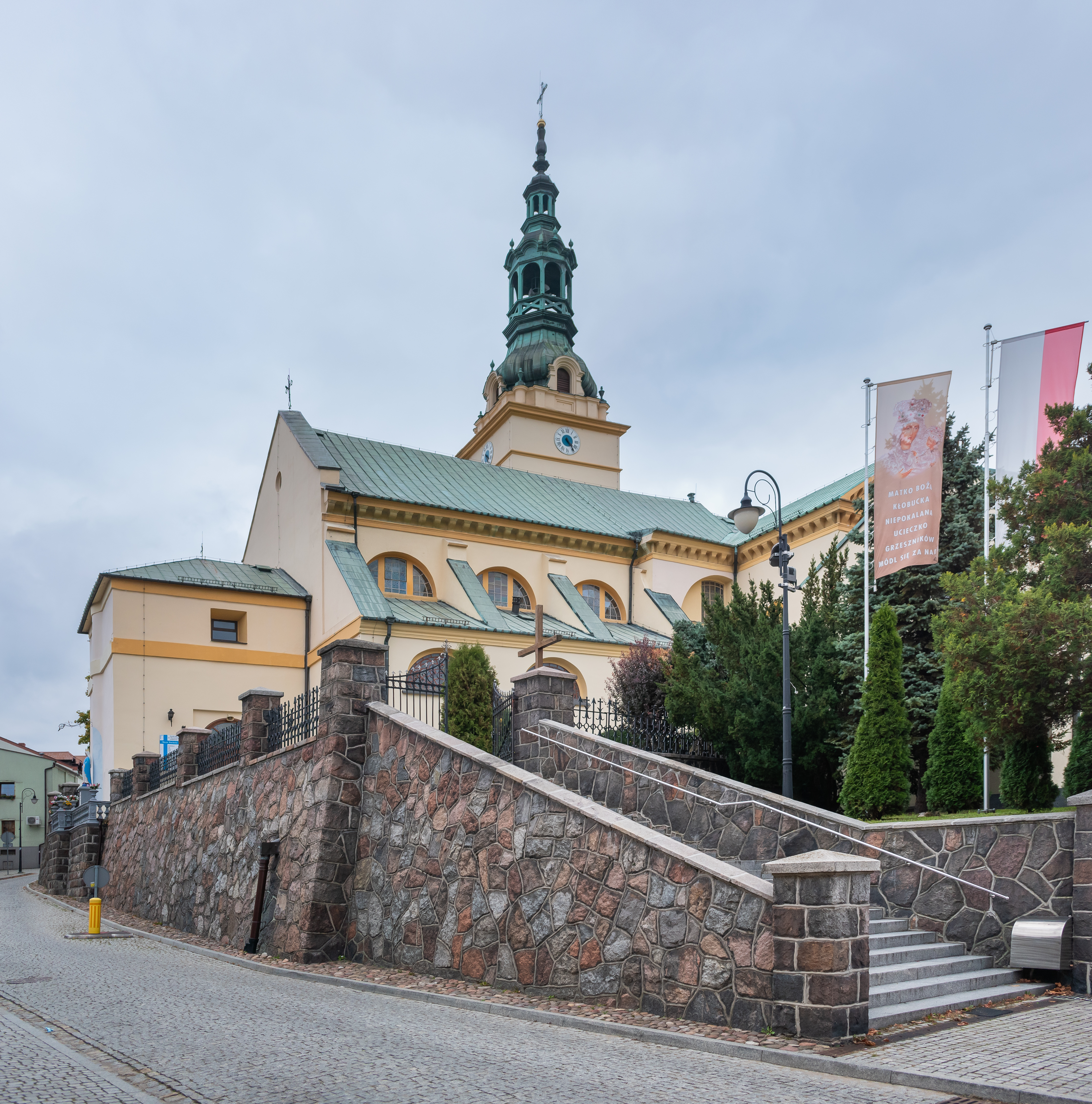
- Saints Martin and Margaret church in Kłobuck

- Flag Coat of arms

- Location within Poland
- Coordinates: 50°55′N 18°56′E
- Country: Poland
- Voivodeship: Silesian
- County: Kłobuck
- Gmina: Kłobuck

Area
  - Total: 47.53 km^{2} (18.35 sq mi)
- Highest elevation: 284 m (932 ft)
- Lowest elevation: 240 m (790 ft)

Population (2019-06-30)
  - Total: 12,934
  - Density: 272.1/km^{2} (704.8/sq mi)
- Time zone: UTC+1 (CET)
  - Summer (DST): UTC+2 (CEST)
- Postal code: 42-100
- Vehicle registration: SKL
- Climate: Cfb
- Website: http://www.gminaklobuck.pl

Kłobuck [ˈkwɔbut͡sk] is a town in southern Poland, with 12,934 inhabitants (2019). Located in the Silesian Voivodeship, about 15 km (9 mi) northwest of Częstochowa, it is the capital of Kłobuck County. Historically, Kłobuck belongs to Lesser Poland, and is located in its extreme northwestern corner, near the border with two other Polish historical provinces – Greater Poland, and Silesia. The town lies among the hills of Lesser Poland Upland. Most of Kłobuck lies 240 to 260 metres above sea level, and the highest point within town's limits is Dębowa Góra (284 metres). Kłobuck has the area of 47 km^{2} (18 sq mi), with forests taking up 20%.

== Etymology ==
In the past, the name of the town was spelled in many different ways – Kłobucko, Kłobuczko, Kłobuczek. Current name has been used since the late 19th century, and it most probably comes from ancient Polish word kłobuk, which is a type of headgear. Another explanation is that kłobuk means “top”, or “summit”, and at the time of its location, the town was on the top of Lesser Poland, as its most extreme northwestern urban centre.

== History ==
Kłobuck was granted town rights in 1339, during the reign of King Casimir III the Great. At that time, it was located along the busy merchant road from Lesser Poland to Greater Poland. Further north, near Wieluń, the road split into two directions – northwest to Poznań, and southwest to Wrocław. According to Jan Długosz, who himself was a canon at Kłobuck, the local St Martin and Margaret Church was built in 1144. Kłobuck was a major local trade center well before receiving its official status as a town. It had a number of artisans, and in 1658 it became the seat of a starosta. As a result of The Deluge and accordingly because of the increase of levies paid to Jasna Góra monastery, the city began to deteriorate. For hundreds of centuries, until 1793 (see Partitions of Poland), the town belonged to Lelów County in the Kraków Voivodeship in the Lesser Poland Province. Annexed by the Kingdom of Prussia, it briefly was part of New Silesia. In 1807 Kłobuck was incorporated into the short-lived Polish Duchy of Warsaw, and after its dissolution it fell to the Russian Empire in 1815. Between 1870 and 1917 Kłobuck was a village, upon order of Tsarist authorities.

In the Second Polish Republic, Kłobuck belonged to Częstochowa County of Kielce Voivodeship. In May 1939, National Defence Battalion “Kłobuck” was formed here.

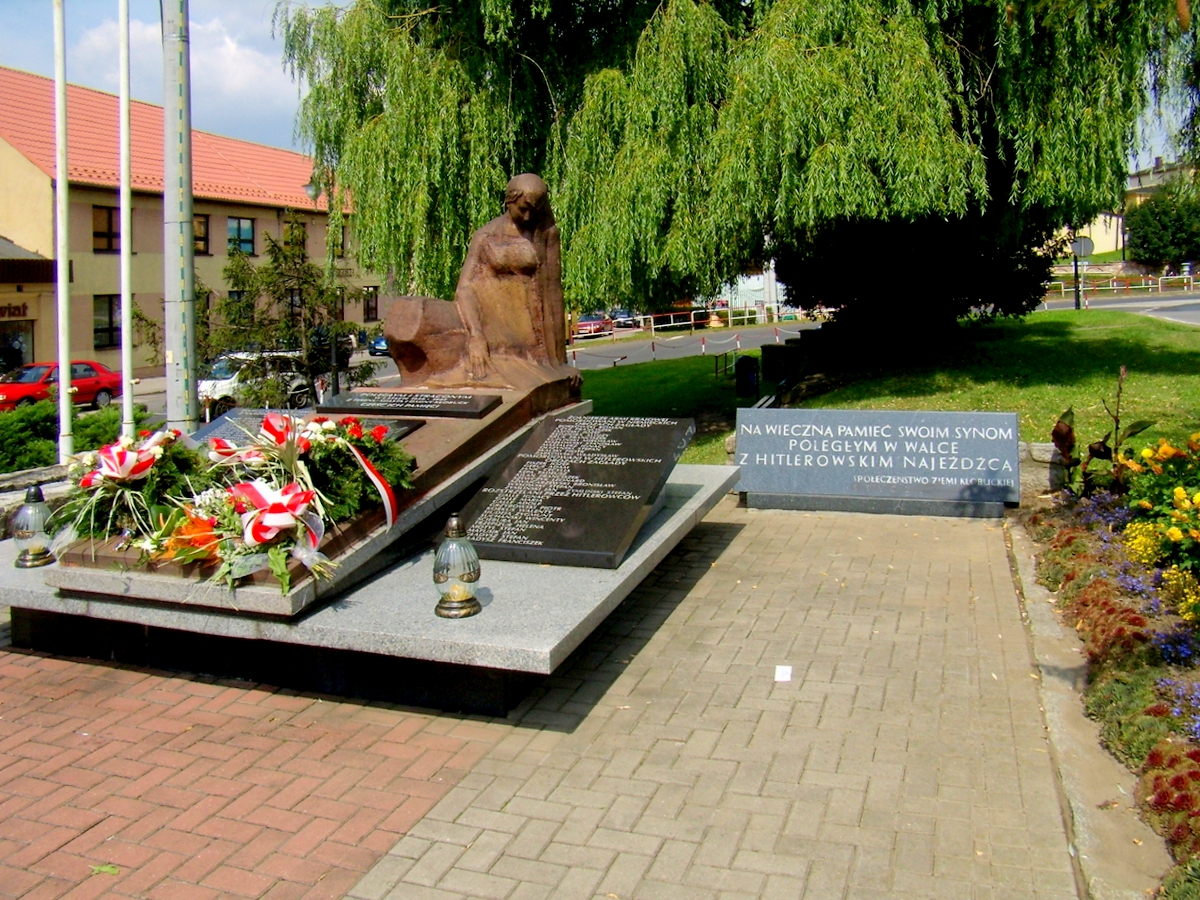
World War II memorial

During the German invasion of Poland at the start of World War II, on September 1, 1939, the Battle of Mokra took place 5 kilometres north of Kłobuck. During the war, the town was incorporated into the Third Reich, as part of the County of Blachownia (German: Landkreis Blachstädt), Upper Silesia Province. In early 1940, the occupiers established a forced labour camp for Jewish men, which was dissolved in July 1943. Three local Polish policemen were murdered by the Russians in the Katyn massacre in 1940. In 1941, the German police carried out expulsions of 3,710 Poles, who were deported to forced labour in Germany, while their houses, shops and workshops were handed over to German colonists. Most of Kłobuck's 2,000 Jews were murdered in the Holocaust.

Some Jewish families that survived the Holocaust moved to other countries, notably, Australia, Canada, Sweden, Israel and the USA. A Jewish Survivor, Zeleg Berkowitz, moved to Sweden and documented the Jewish communities life in Pre-Holocaust Klobuck.

In the immediate postwar period, Kłobuck returned to Kielce Voivodeship, but in 1950, together with Częstochowa, it was moved to Katowice Voivodeship. In 1952, Kłobuck County was created, and in 1975–1999, the town belonged to Częstochowa Voivodeship. After the war, Kłobuck quickly developed in the 1950s and 1960s, when several heavy industry enterprises were opened, and iron ore deposits were found.

== Geography ==
Kłobuck is located on the border of two mesoregions: Wieluń Upland and Krzepice Slip, which form a part of Wieluń-Woźniki Upland. Kłobuck is located by the Biała Oksza river and Czarna Oksza river.

=== Landscape ===
The city is located on a hilly fragment of Woźniki-Wieluń Upland. The highest point within the town's limits is Dębowa Góra – 284 meters above the sea level.

=== Land use ===
Kłobuck has an area of 4,746 km^{2} (1,832 sq mi). About 71% of the area is used for agricultural purposes (mostly for arable farming and grazing). About 20% of the town's area is forested, whilst 9% of the land is covered by houses, industrial estates and infrastructure such as roads.

=== Nature ===
Dębowa Góra nature reserve is located within the town's limits, 2 km (1 mi) from the town centre. This nature reserve gives special protection to the remains of primeval oak and hornbeam forests. Most of the forests within Kłobuck's limits are a part of the Kłobuck forest district (Nadleśnictwo Kłobuck). There are no big natural bodies of water within the town's limits. The Zakrzew reservoir is located on the border of Rybno village and Kłobuck.

== Demographics ==
Historical population

Year	Pop.	±%
1897	3,576	—
1910	3,778	+5.6%
1921	5,222	+38.2%
1931	8,542	+63.6%

Year	Pop.	±%
1939	8,658	+1.4%
1950	6,616	−23.6%
1960	8,534	+29.0%
2010	13,085	+53.3%

== Sights ==
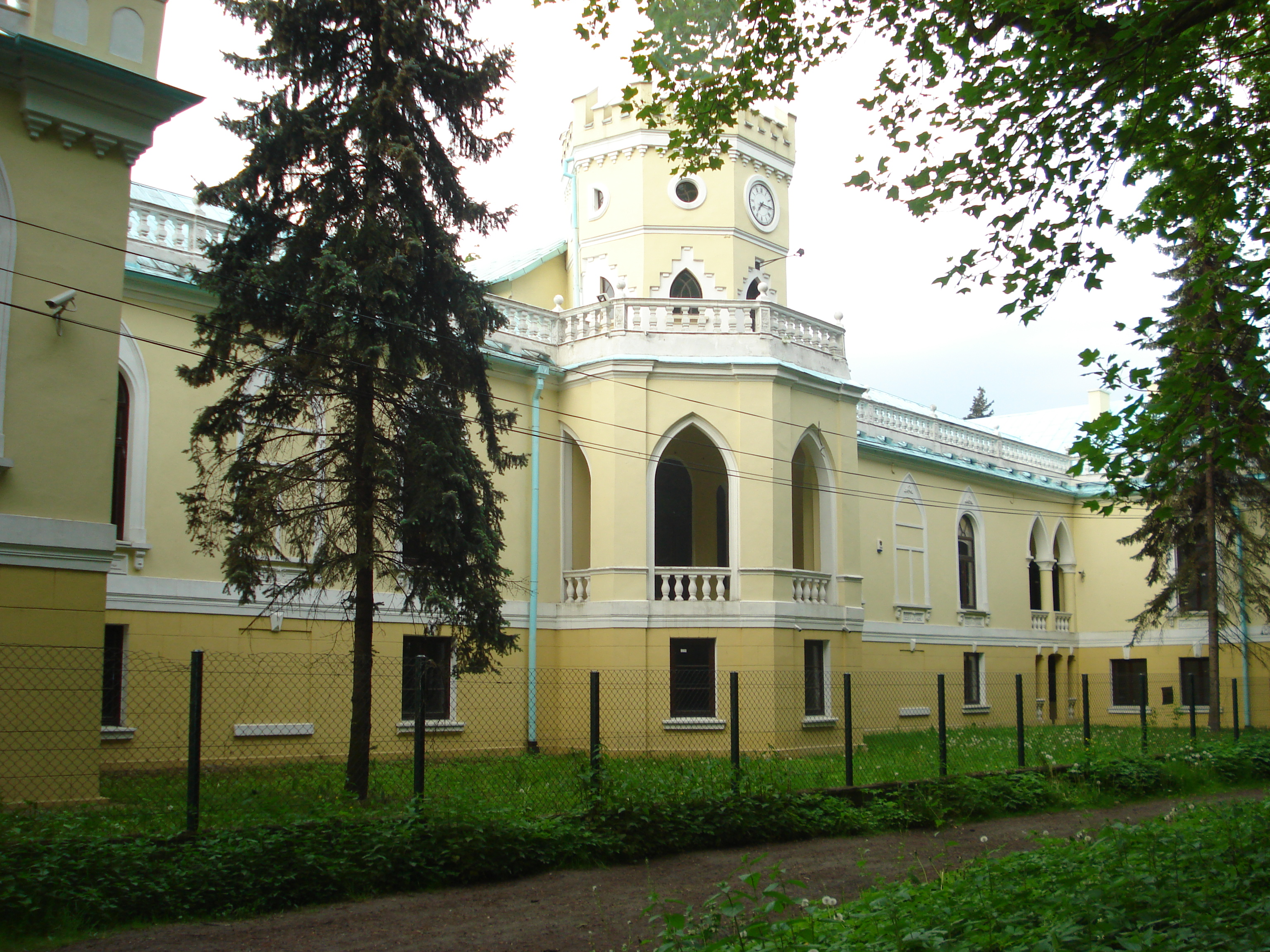
Palace in Zagórze

- Church of Saint Martin and Margaret – church built in its original form in 12th and 13th century. The first stone church was built in 1144 in a Romanesque style. In the beginning of the 15th century, Kłobuck parish was one of the biggest in Poland covering the area of 800 km^{2} (310 sq mi). Between 1443 and 1458, Jan Długosz, one of the most famous chroniclers in Poland was a parish priest in Kłobuck. Certain church buildings are listed on historical monuments list. They include a church building from the 14th century, vicarage and granary (both built in the 15th century).
- Palace in Kłobuck Zagórze – historic palace built in 1795 in the neo gothic style. It is surrounded by a park with an area of 4.3 ha. The palace was built for a Prussian minister Christian Graf von Haugwitz. Subsequent owners included Benedykt Lemański, Guido Henckel von Donnersmarck, and Grand Duke Alexander Mikhailovich of Russia. After the First World War the palace became a property of the Treasury of State. Between 1918 and 1939 a Forestry School was located in the palace and between 1952 and 1972 the seat of the County Council. Subsequently, a garments factory "Elegance" was located there. Recently, refurbishment works have started in the palace.

== Transport ==
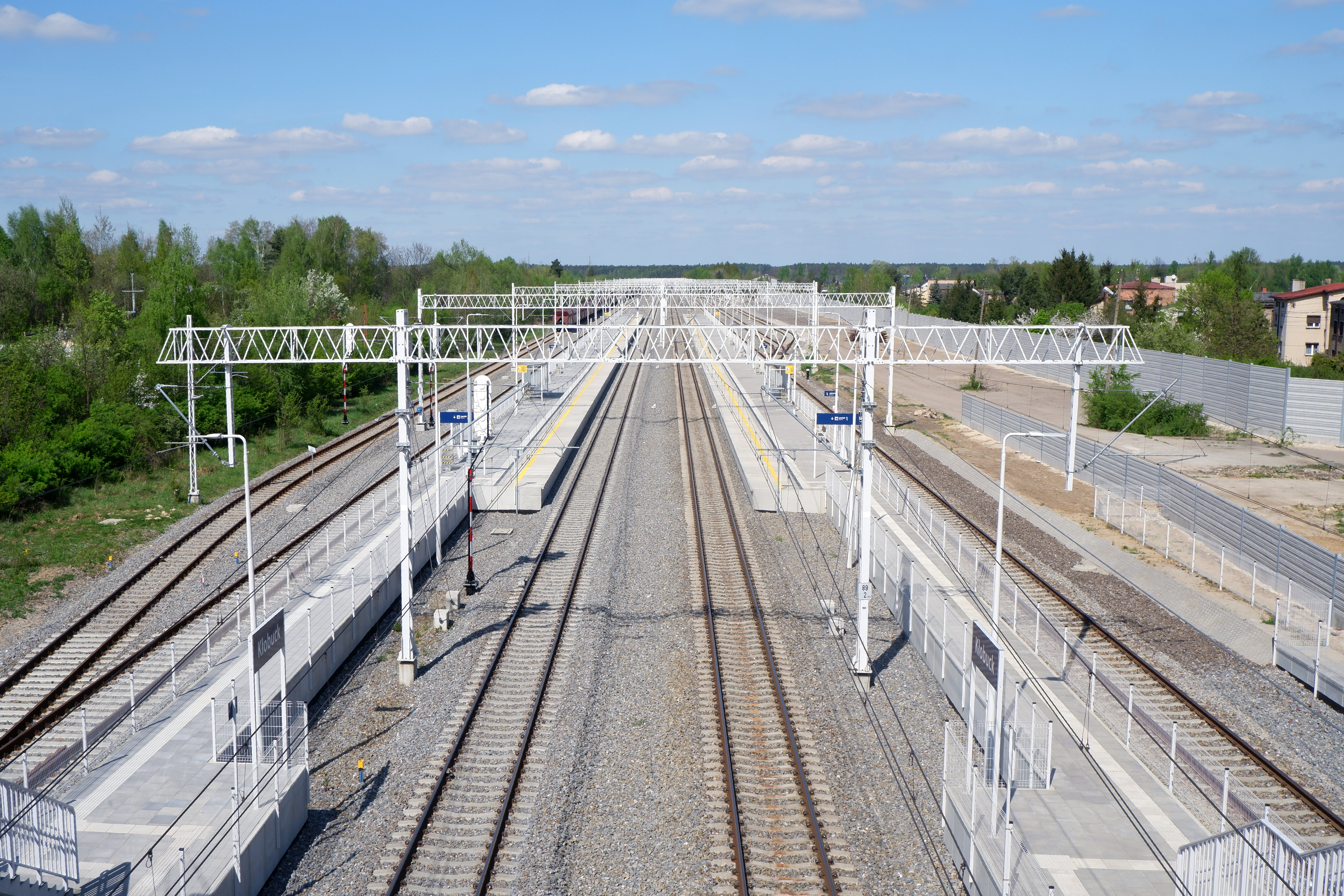
Railway station

Main road connections from the Kłobuck include connection with Wieluń (to the north-west) and Częstochowa (to the south-east) via the National Road DK 43. Kłobuck also has a rail station, along Polish Coal Trunk-Line, which since 2006 has been used freight trains only.

== Twin towns – sister cities ==
See twin towns of Gmina Kłobuck.

== Gallery ==
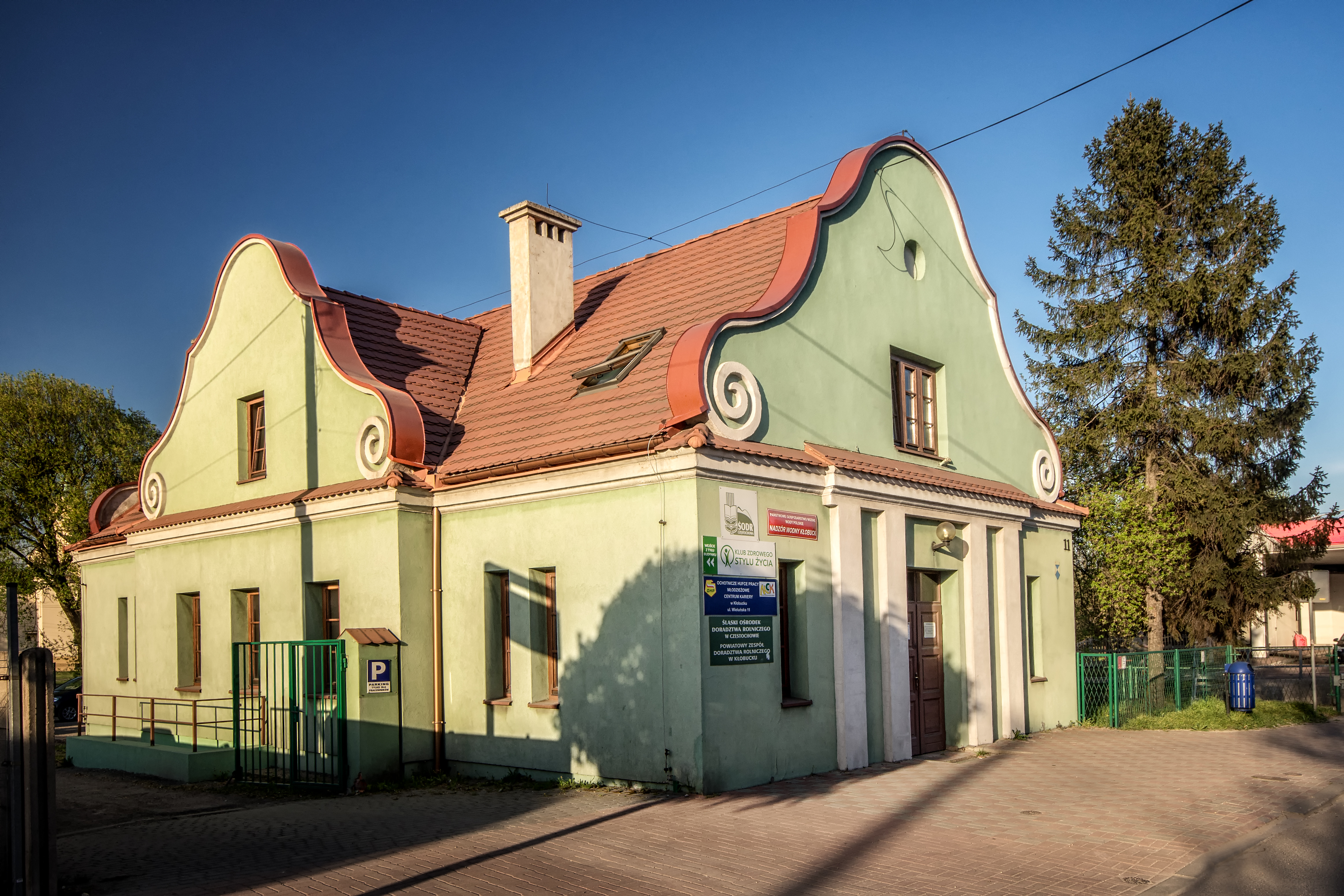
Historic municipal bath

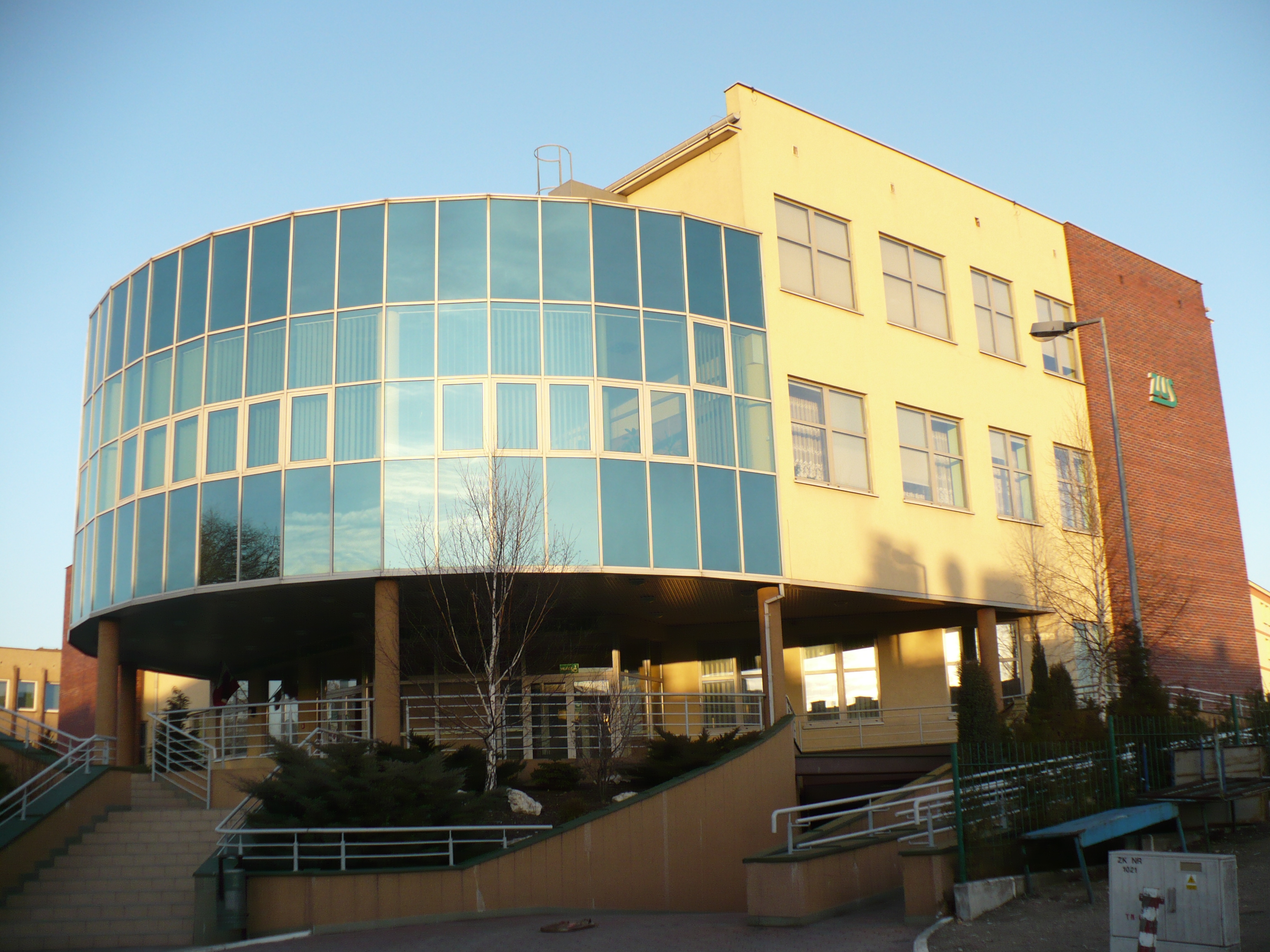
National Insurance building
