= Max Hess (musician) =

German musician

Max Hess (March 1, 1878 – January 25, 1975) was a noted German horn player.

Born in Klingenthal, Saxony, Hess studied with Friedrich Gumpert in Germany from 1896 to 1899. He first played the hand horn before switching to the valved horn. From 1899 to 1905, he played with the Frankfurt Philharmonic, the Gürzenich Orchestra in Cologne (where he played in the premiere performance of Gustav Mahler's Fifth Symphony in 1904), and with the Liszt Society.

In 1905, Hess moved to the United States to play with the Boston Symphony Orchestra, where he remained until 1925. He then joined the Cincinnati Symphony Orchestra, retiring in 1937. He spent the final years of his life in a nursing home near Boston, Massachusetts.
