= Ben Gumpert =

Russell Benjamin Wallace Gumpert, known as Ben Gumpert, QC (born 27 February 1963) is a Crown Court Judge, (styled His Honour Judge Gumpert QC) and former barrister, specialising in international and domestic criminal law. Gumpert was previously a Senior Trial Lawyer at the International Criminal Court (ICC), leading the prosecution team in the case against Dominic Ongwen In 2012 Gumpert prosecuted to conviction the first 'modern slavery' case (R v Connors and ors.) in the UK

== Career as a barrister ==
Gumpert was called to the Bar of England and Wales in 1987. He is a member of Inner Temple. Until 1998 he was a member of barristers’ chambers at 4 King's Bench Walk, and thereafter at 36 Bedford Row. He joined the Crown Prosecution Service in 2010 as a Principle Crown Advocate before moving to the ICC in 2013 as a Senior Trial Lawyer. He was appointed Queen's Counsel in 2014 Between 2003 and 2008 at the International Criminal Tribunal for Rwanda, he defended Justin Mugenzi, one of the Rwandan government ministers who were ultimately acquitted of planning and organising genocide in Rwanda in 1994

== International Criminal Court ==
Gumpert led the prosecution team in the case of Uhuru Kenyatta at the ICC. The case of Dominic Ongwen, in which Gumpert led the prosecution team at the ICC, is notable for its emphasis on sexual and gender based crimes. Nineteen of the 70 confirmed charges allege crimes of this nature. The case has also been said to represent “a milestone precedent for future cases, not just in terms of circumventing situations of witness interference, but more importantly, in safeguarding vulnerable victims and witnesses, and preserving their evidence for any eventual trial. At the ICC, Gumpert takes the lead within the Prosecution Division on advocacy training He has written and spoken about potential reforms to improve the efficiency of proceedings in international courts and tribunals

Gumpert was reportedly on the list of candidates to be interviewed for the post of ICC Prosecutor. However he withdrew his candidacy upon being appointed a Circuit Judge on 25 May 2020
