= Friedrich Gumpert =

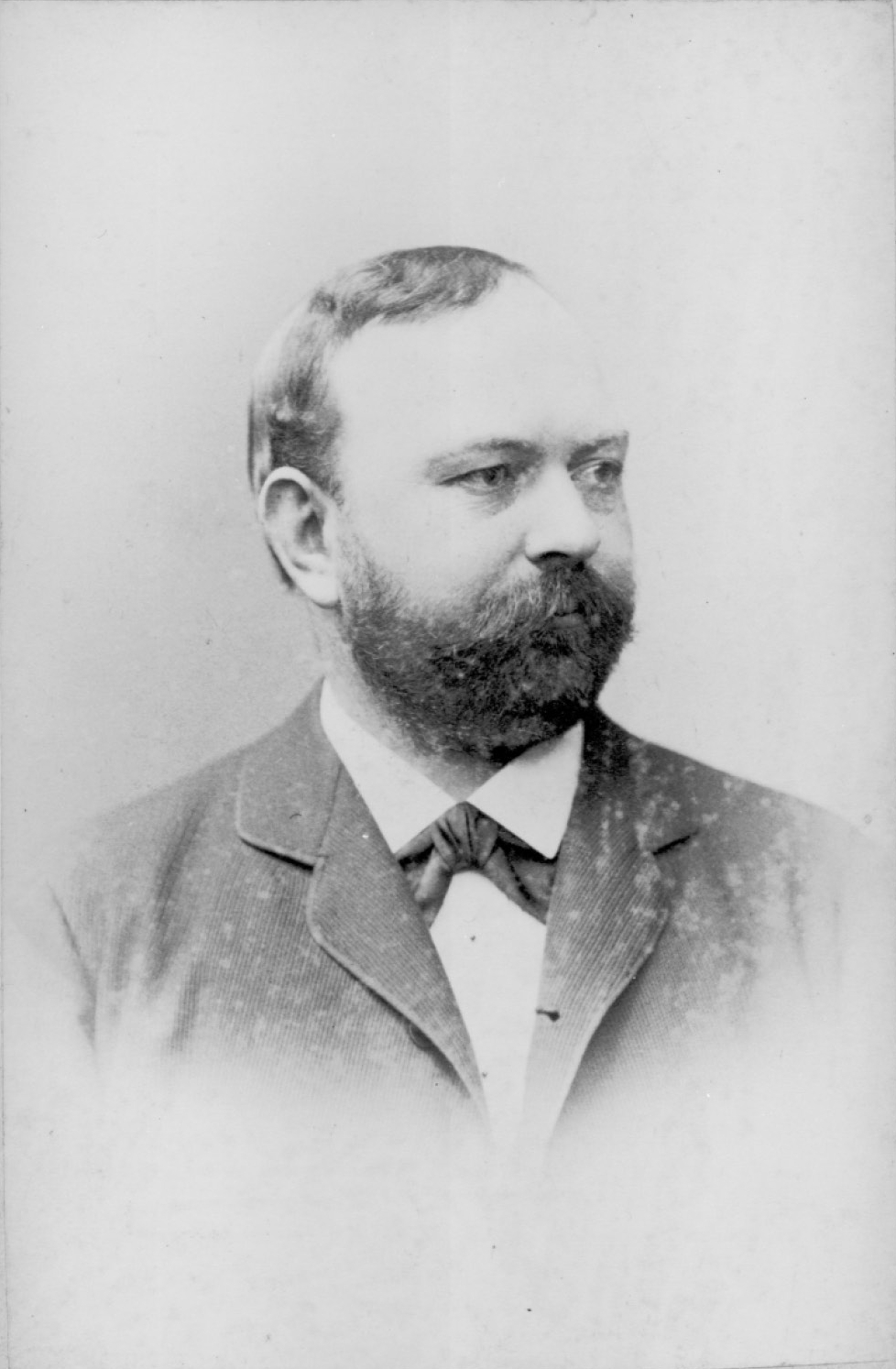
Friedrich Adolph Gumpert

Friedrich Adolph Gumpert (27 April 1841, in Lichtenau (Thüringen) – 31 December 1906, in Leipzig) was a German horn player and teacher.

Gumpert received his early musical education in Jena. From 1860 he was a horn player, first in Bad Nauheim, then (after completing his military service) in Halle. In October 1864, at the behest of Carl Reinecke, he became First Horn in the Gewandhausorchester Leipzig, a position he held until 1899. He was a founder member of the Gewandhaus-Bläserquintett, formed in 1896.

Gumpert was Professor of Horn at the Leipzig Conservatory from 1882 until his death. As well as Heinrich Lorbeer, his pupils included Anton Horner, Max Hess and Max Pottag, all three highly influential in the development of horn playing in the United States. His publications (all of which appear, erroneously, under the name "Gumbert") include twelve volumes of orchestral excerpt books (Orchesterstudien) arranged for horn and other wind instruments, a horn method, and many arrangements for horn and piano.
