= Krajková =

- Municipality
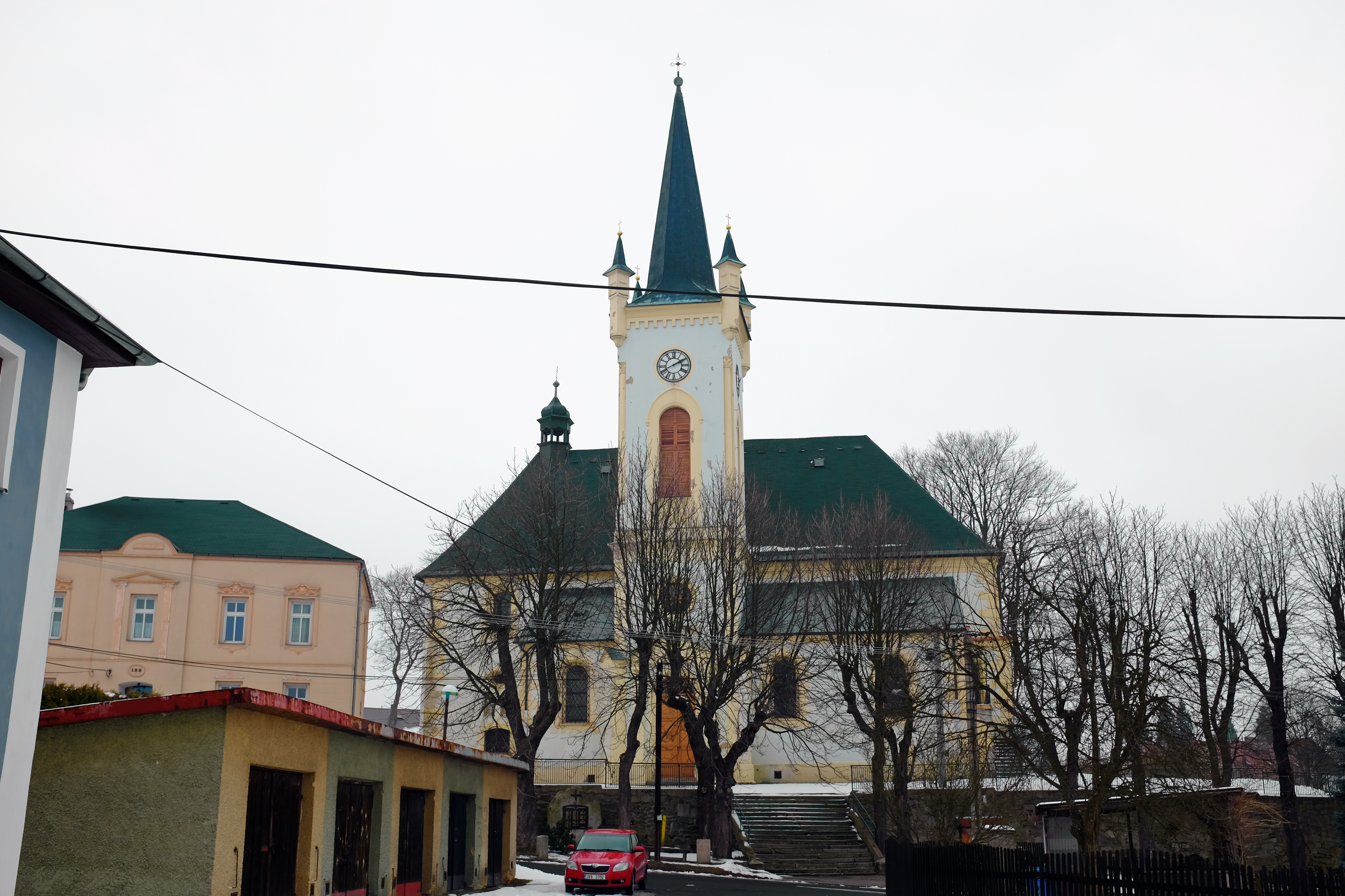
- Church of Saints Peter and Paul

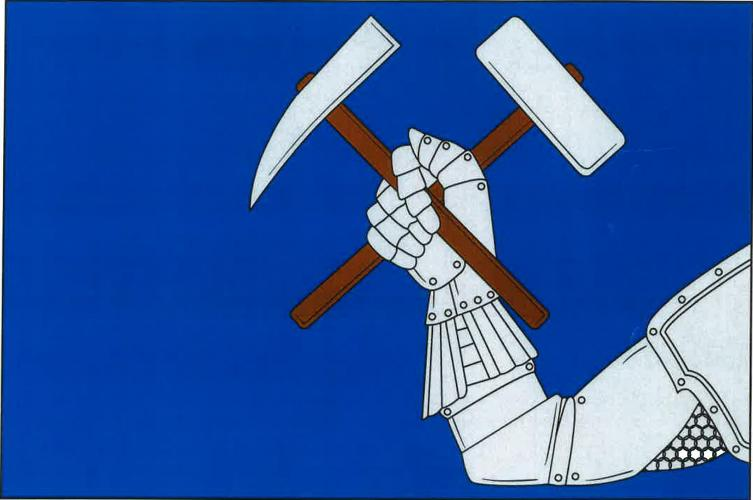
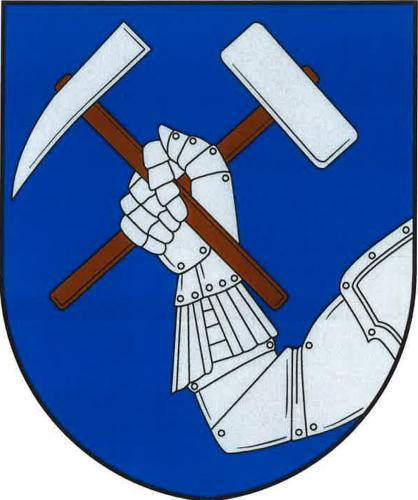
- Flag Coat of arms

- Location in the Czech Republic
- Coordinates: 50°12′58″N 12°32′3″E
- Country: Czech Republic
- Region: Karlovy Vary
- District: Sokolov
- First mentioned: 1350

Area
  - Total: 35.23 km^{2} (13.60 sq mi)
- Elevation: 582 m (1,909 ft)

Population (2026-01-01)
  - Total: 920
  - Density: 26/km^{2} (68/sq mi)
- Time zone: UTC+1 (CET)
  - Summer (DST): UTC+2 (CEST)
- Postal code: 357 08
- Website: www.krajkova.com

Krajková (German: Gossengrün) is a municipality and village in Sokolov District in the Karlovy Vary Region of the Czech Republic. It has about 900 inhabitants.

== Administrative division ==
Krajková consists of seven municipal parts (in brackets population according to the 2021 census):

- Krajková (724)
- Anenská Ves (38)
- Bernov (8)
- Dolina (28)
- Hrádek (22)
- Květná (43)
- Libnov (33)

== Etymology ==
Until 1947, the German name Gossengrün was used, meaning "Goss' glade". In 1947, the municipality was renamed. The current Czech name is derived from krajka (i.e. 'lace') and refers to the craft historically associated with the settlement.

== Geography ==
Krajková is located about 9 kilometres (6 mi) northwest of Sokolov and 22 km (14 mi) west of Karlovy Vary. It lies in the Ore Mountains. The highest point is the hill Jelení vrch at 720 m (2,360 ft) above sea level. The stream of Libocký potok and Horka Reservoir, built on the stream, form the western municipal border.

== History ==
The first written mention of Krajková is from 1350. It was a mining town where lead was mined. During the Thirty Years' War, mining ceased. In 1818, the village shifted its focus to lace production. In 1947, Krajková lost its town status.

From 1938 to 1945, Krajková was annexed by Nazi Germany and administered as part of the Reichsgau Sudetenland. After World War II, the German-speaking population was expelled.

== Demographics ==
Historical population

Year	Pop.	±%
1869	3,558	—
1880	3,630	+2.0%
1890	2,935	−19.1%
1900	3,069	+4.6%
1910	3,238	+5.5%

Year	Pop.	±%
1921	3,098	−4.3%
1930	3,324	+7.3%
1950	1,381	−58.5%
1961	1,106	−19.9%
1970	898	−18.8%

Year	Pop.	±%
1980	866	−3.6%
1991	776	−10.4%
2001	832	+7.2%
2011	830	−0.2%
2021	896	+8.0%

Source: Censuses

== Transport ==
The railway line Sokolov–Kraslice passes through the eastern part of the territory, but there is no train station. The nearest station is Hřebeny in neighbouring Josefov.

== Sights ==
The main landmark of Krajková is the Church of Saints Peter and Paul. It is originally a Gothic church, reconstructed in the Renaissance style in the 16th century. Its current appearance is the result of a modern reconstruction in the 19th century.

== Notable people ==
- Anton Horner (1877–1971), American horn player
