= Timeline of the 1939 invasion of Poland =

The invasion of Poland was a joint offensive on the Republic of Poland by Nazi Germany, the Slovak Republic, the Free City of Danzig, and the Soviet Union, which marked the beginning of World War II. The invasion began on 1 September 1939, when German, Slovak, and Danzig forces entered Poland. The Soviets invaded Poland on 17 September. The campaign ended on 6 October with Germany and the Soviet Union dividing and annexing the whole of Poland under the terms of the German–Soviet Frontier Treaty. The aim of the invasions was to disestablish Poland as a sovereign country, with its citizens destined for extermination.

The following is a timeline of the invasion, which includes events preluding to the offensives, battles and attacks during the invasion, before ending with the last Polish armed forces surrendering on 6 October, which then begins the Polish resistance movement against the German Military Administration in Poland and the Soviet Union occupational administration.

== Prelude ==
- 15 June: The German Military High Command finalized the plans for an invasion of Poland, codenamed Operation Fall Weiss, also known as Operation White Castle.

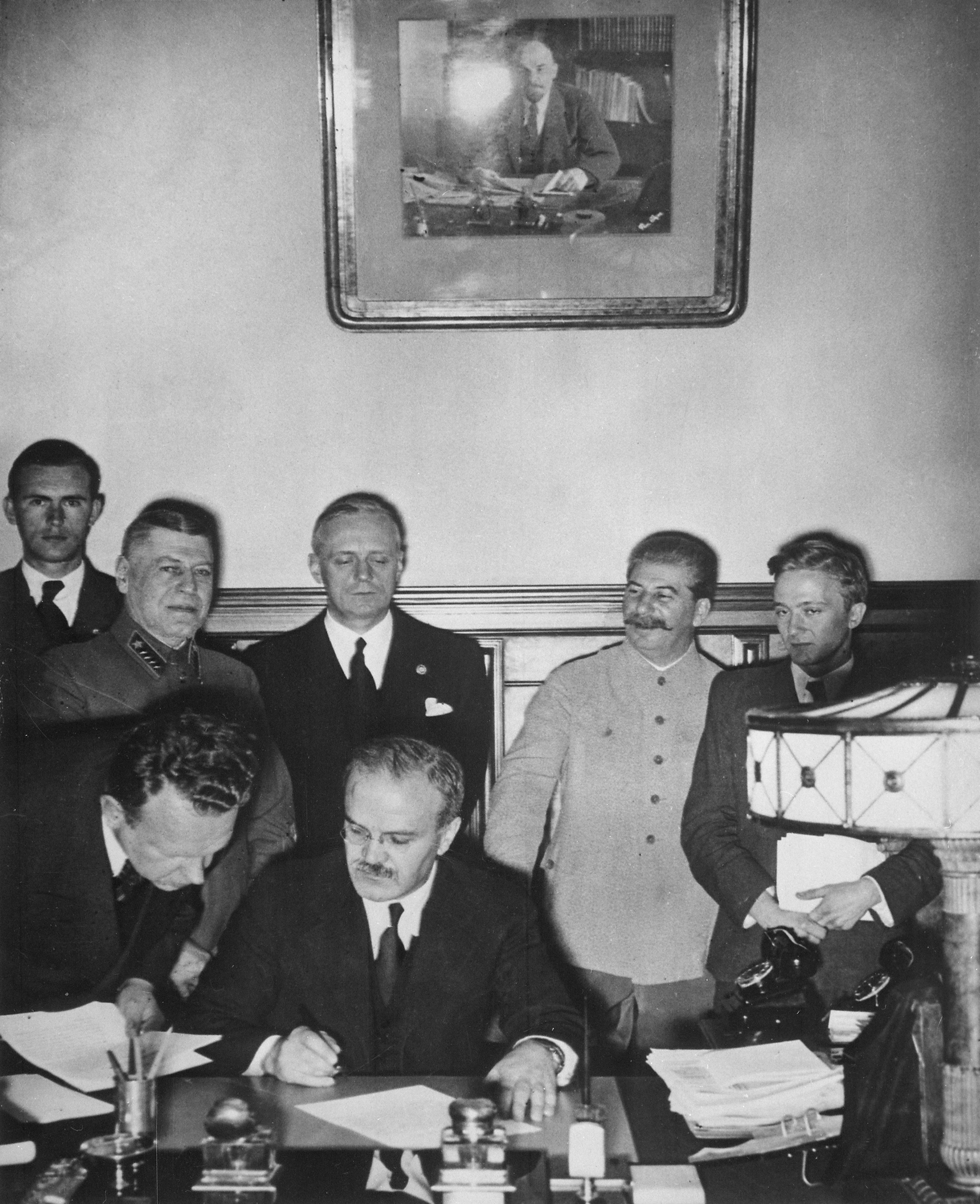
Molotov and Ribbentrop sign the Molotov–Ribbentrop Pact, in the presence of Joseph Stalin, the dictator of the Soviet Union

- 17 August: Following German advances that started in early 1939, Vyacheslav Molotov, the Soviet Union Foreign Affairs Minister, after the failure to find a diplomatic agreement with the Allies, agreed to secretive diplomatic talks with the Germans.
- 21 August: Joachim von Ribbentrop, the German Minister of Foreign Affairs, arrives in Moscow for negotiations with Molotov.
- 23 August: The Treaty of Non-Aggression between Germany and the Union of Soviet Socialist Republics, commonly known as the Molotov–Ribbentrop Pact, was signed by Molotov and Ribbentrop. The treaty established a non-aggression pact between Nazi Germany and the Soviet Union, with a secret protocol establishing Soviet and German spheres of influence across Eastern Europe, including the division of Poland between the two countries. The treaty's existence was rumored to exist among the Allies throughout World War II, and was only proven to exist during the Nuremberg trials.
- 25 August:
  - Adolf Hitler, dispatches orders to the Wehrmacht to invade Poland on 26 August following the plans of Case White.
  - The United Kingdom signs an agreement with Poland, reaffirming mutual military assistance between the nations if either was attacked by some "European country", as agreed upon in the Anglo-Polish alliance.
- 26 August:
  - Hitlers postpones the invasion of Poland after being "considerably shaken" (according to General Franz Halder) by the reaffirmation of the Anglo-Polish alliance.
  - Approximately 70 German Abwehr agents, commanded by Lieutenant Hans-Albrecht Herzner, attacked and failed to capture a key rail station and tunnel in the Jablunkov Pass in Poland. The attack, which became known as the Jabłonków incident, was part of Case White. Herzner was unaware Hitler had postponed the invasion at the last moment. The Jabłonków incident has been named the first commando operation of World War II.
- 28 August: German saboteur Anton Guzy planted and detonated two time bombs hidden in suitcases at the Tarnów train station in Poland, killing 20 people and injuring 35 others.

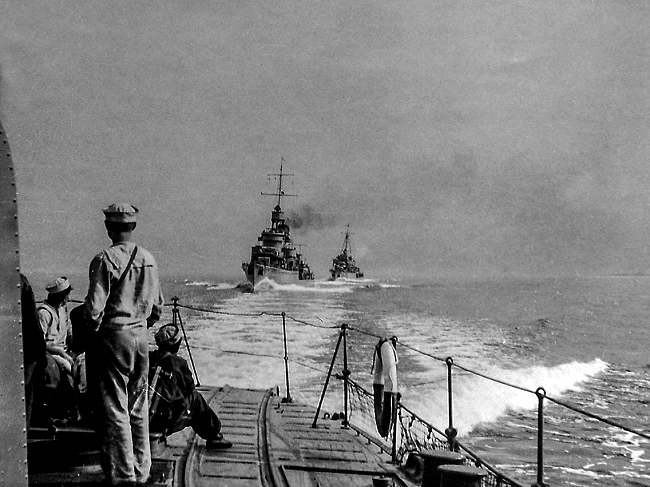
Polish destroyers evacuate to the United Kingdom during the Peking Plan

- 29 August: Polish Minister of Foreign Affairs Józef Beck ordered military mobilization, but cancelled the mobilization after pressure from the United Kingdom and France.
- 30 August:
  - The Polish government orders general mobilization of the military again, to go into effect on 31 August.
  - Poland launches Operation Peking, which successfully evacuates three destroyers of the Polish Navy, the Burza, Błyskawica, and Grom, to the United Kingdom.
  - The Polish government announces that it has carried out defensive mining operations in its territorial waters.
- 31 August:
  - Nazi sympathizer Edward VIII, the Duke of Windsor, sent a message to Victor Emmanuel III, the King of Italy, asking for Italy to intervene and try to prevent Germany and Poland from going to war.
  - Hitler signs off and orders Heinrich Himmler, the leader of the Schutzstaffel (SS), to execute Operation Himmler, which consisted of several false flag operations to create various pretexts for an invasion of Poland.
    - Under Operation Himmler, SS officers, led by Alfred Naujocks, wearing Polish military uniforms, attacked the Gleiwitz Radio Station in Gleiwitz in Germany (today Gliwice, Poland). Oskar Schindler, who is known for saving the lives of 1,200 Jews during the Holocaust, assisted the SS in the attack.
  - Germany sends a last-minute ultimatum to Poland, which included 16 demands. Hitler later gave a speech announcing Poland rejected these demands before the invasion started, despite the ultimatum not being presented to Poland prior to the invasion.

== September ==
=== 1 September ===
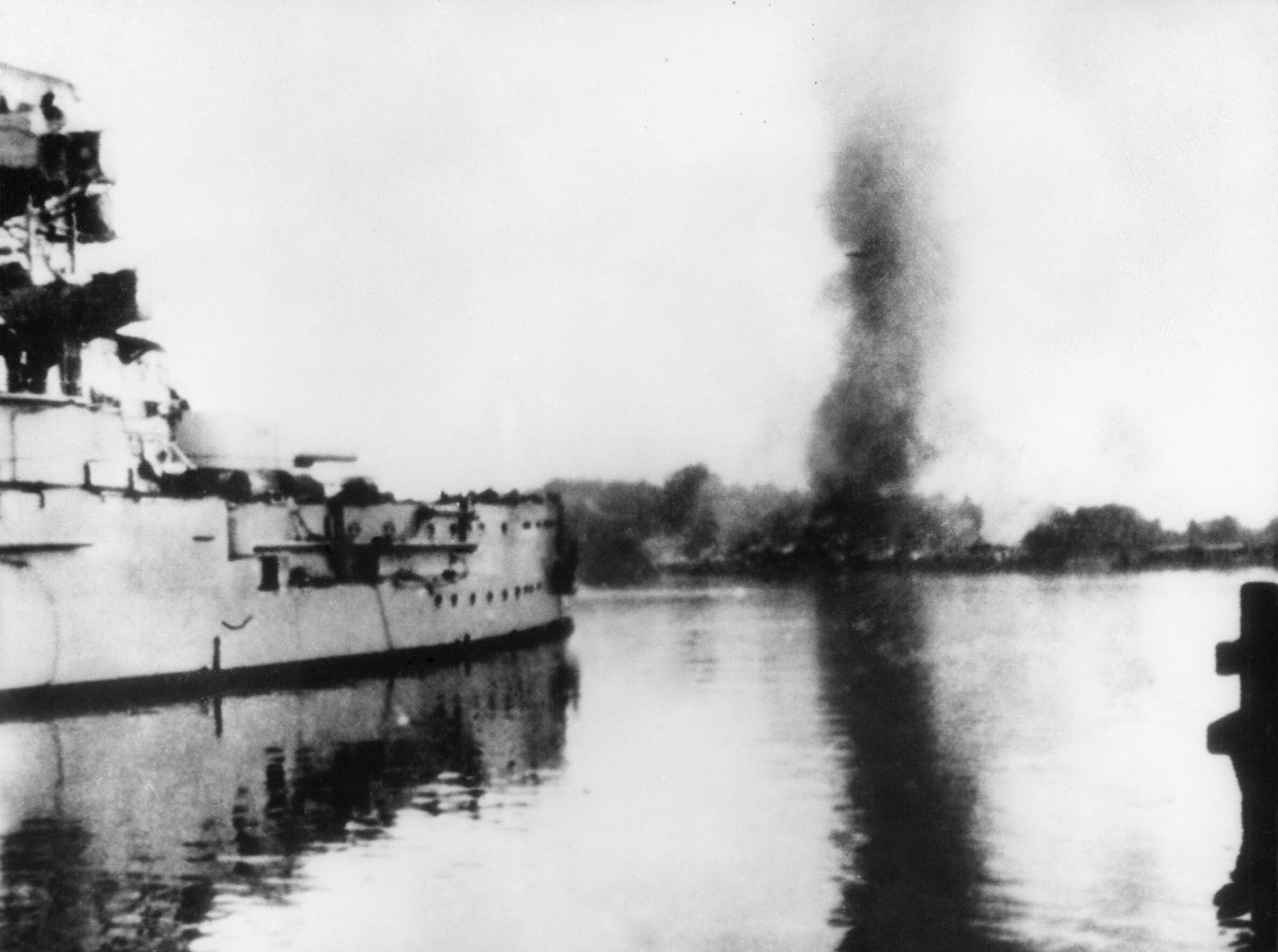
The German battleship Schleswig-Holstein firing her guns during the battle of Westerplatte; taken by a Nazi collaborator photographer with the Associated Press

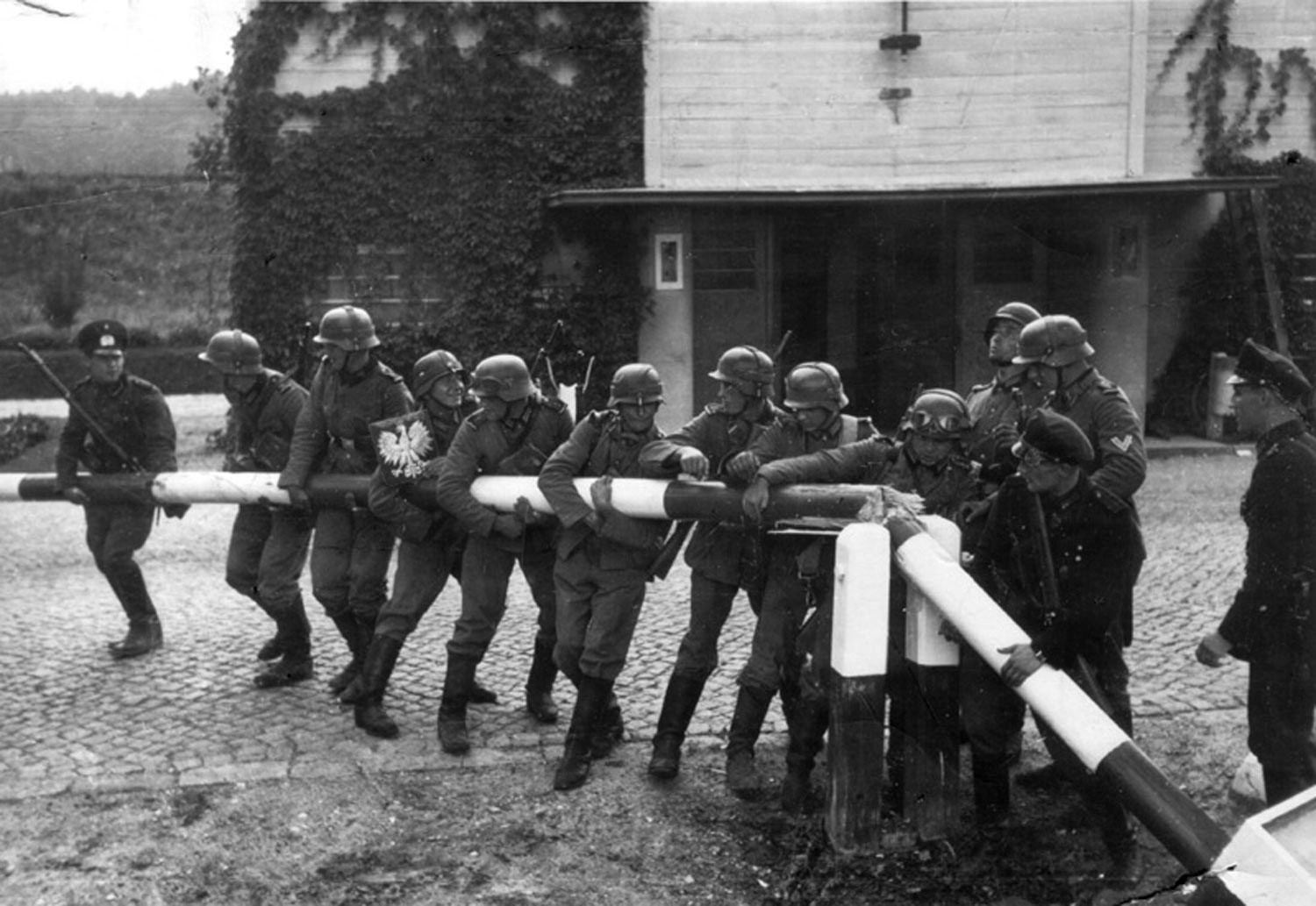
Danzig Police demolish a Polish border crossing

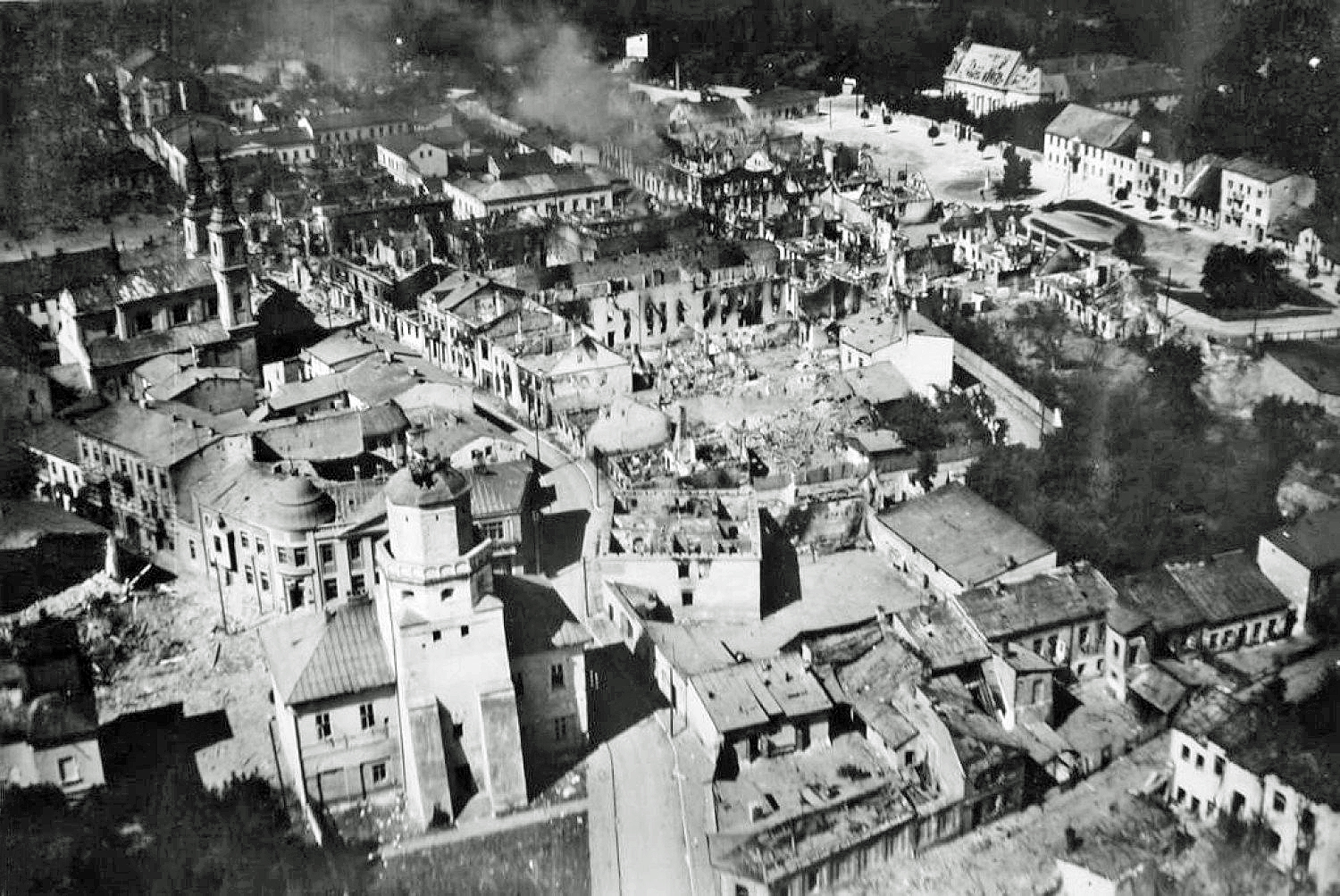
The town of Wieluń after German bombing

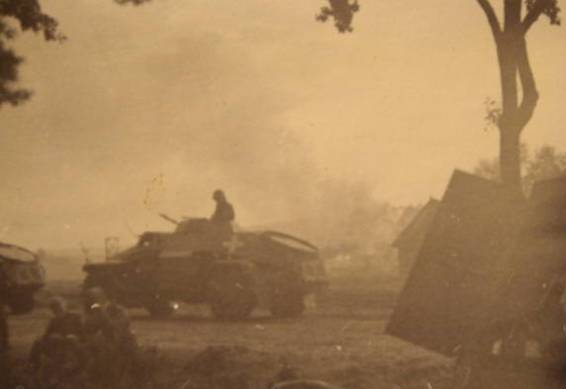
German armored car Sd.Kfz.221 during the battle of Tuchola Forest

- Around 04:30 German Stukas III./KG1 dive bombers attack Polish sapper positions around the Tczew Road Bridge in the unsuccessful attempt to preempt the demolition of the bridge. This is widely recognized as the first attack of the invasion of Poland and subsequently World War II.
- At 04:45, the German battleship Schleswig-Holstein opens fire on the Polish garrison at Westerplatte, Free City of Danzig, starting the battle of Westerplatte.
- At 04:45, the Free City of Danzig Police began attacking the Polish Post Office in Danzig.
- At 04:45, the Luftwaffe targeted civilians during the bombing of Wieluń, which marked the first German war crime in World War II.
- At 05:00, approximately 50,000 Slovak soldiers cross the Polish border, beginning the Slovak invasion of Poland.
- At 05:00, the German Tenth Army, 31st Infantry Division, 1st and 4th Panzer Divisions crossed the Polish border and engaged the Polish Volhynian Cavalry Brigade and 7th Infantry Division near the village of Mokra. The subsequent battle of Mokra led to one of the few Polish victories during World War II, as confusion among the German lines led to the Germans firing on their own positions.
- Around 05:15, 225 German Marinestosstruppkompanie (marine shock-troops) and 1,500 Free City of Danzig Police engaged Polish defenders during the battle of Westerplatte. During the engagement, Polish Staff Sergeant Wojciech Najsarek was killed by machine-gun fire. Najsarek has been described as the first Polish combat casualty of the battle and perhaps of World War II.
- The German 3rd Army began attacking the town of Mława, which was defended by the Polish 20th Infantry Division. This attack began the German offensive known as the Battle of the Border.
- The German 4th Army advanced into the Polish Corridor, but was stopped by a Polish counterattack near Krojanty. The counterattack, known as the charge at Krojanty, was by the 18th Uhlans and gave birth to the myth of Polish cavalry attacking German tanks. The battle at Krojanty was one of the several engagements during the Battle of Tuchola Forest, where German forces were attempting to connect mainland Germany with East Prussia through the Tuchola Forest.
- The German 7th Infantry Division, under the command of Major General Eugen Ott, attacked fortified Polish defenses near Węgierska Górka. During the battle, the Germans outnumbers the Polish defenders 100 to 1, but suffered "heavy casualties" after breakthrough attempts were repelled. An eyewittness account of the battle was documented in From Lemberg to Bordeaux ('Von Lemberg bis Bordeaux'), written by Leo Leixner, a journalist and war correspondent.
- The German 5th Panzer Division began attacking the Polish 6th Infantry Division near Pszczyna amid the Battle of the Border.
- The Polish Navy launches Operation Worek, in which Poland's five submarines formed a screen in order to prevent German naval forces from carrying out landings on the Polish coast, and to attack enemy ships bombarding Polish coastal fortifications, in particular the base on the Hel Peninsula.
- The German military launches an assault on the Polish Hel Fortified Area, which would last until 2 October.
- At 11:00, several hours after the invasion of Poland began, Hitler gives a speech at the German Reichstag, announcing a declaration of war against Poland, using the false flag attacks during Operation Himmler and Poland declining Germany's ultimatum a few hours earlier as justifications for the invasion.
- The Einsatzgruppen, the death squads branch of the SS, begin Operation Tannenberg in Poland, which would kill around 20,000 selected Poles in two months.
- The Free City of Danzig is annexed by Germany.
- The House of Commons of the United Kingdom passes an emergency military budget, preparing for war against Germany.
- Polish Navy warships were attacked by German Luftwaffe aircraft in Gdańsk Bay (then Danzig Bay). The subsequent battle of Danzig Bay was the first naval-air battle of World War II.

=== 2 September ===
- The Polish 16th Pomeranian Infantry Division counterattacks and recaptures lost territory during the battle of Grudziądz.
- The German 4th Army crosses the Brda River.
- In Stutthof, Germany, (formerly part of the Free City of Danzig), a prisoner-of-war camp for Polish prisoners is opened by the Germans. This camp eventually becomes Stutthof concentration camp in 1942.
- German troops conduct massacres in Bukownica, Gostyń, Łaziska Dolne, Łaziska Średnie, Torzeniec, Wyszanów, Parzymiechy and Zimnowoda, killing over 200 Poles, including women and children.
- The Luftwaffe bombed a train with civilian refugees from Krotoszyn in Koło, killing 300 people.
- Following the United Kingdom's lead, the French Parliament also approves an emergency war budget preparing for war against Germany.
- The British and French governments agree they will jointly issue an ultimatum to Germany.

=== 3 September ===
- During the withdrawal of Polish troops from Bydgoszcz, local Germans opened fire on Polish soldiers and civilians, forcing them into a defensive battle in which several hundred people were killed on both sides. The event was referred to as the Bloody Sunday by the propaganda of Nazi Germany, with number of German victims upped to 58,000 by German propagandists.
- Bombing of Skierniewice by the Luftwaffe begins.
- German troops perpetrated massacres in Albertów, Imielin, Jankowice, Kobielice, Krzepice, Lędziny, Mysłów, Nierada, Pińczyce, Święta Anna, Zawiść, Zgoń and Zrębice, killing 320 Poles, including women and children.
- Soviet Defense Commissar Voroshilov orders seven military districts in the western Soviet Union to increase their combat readiness.

=== 4 September ===
- Schleswig-Holstein intensifies its bombardment (supported through 21cm howitzers brought from East Prussia) against Polish defenders at Westerplatte as the Battle of Westerplatte continues.
- German 8th Army captures five bridges across the Warta river intact and begins its river crossing.
- Polish high command assigns the 41st Infantry Division and 44th Infantry Division, both still in deployment and unready for combat, to frontline duty to throw them into action.
- German troops carried out massacres in Cielętniki, Częstochowa, Kruszyna, Pasternik, Pławno, Pszczyna, Siewierz, and Sosnowiec, killing over 350 Poles, including women and children.
- Start of the evacuation of the Polish gold reserve from Warsaw to Lublin.
- The Luftwaffe bombed a train with civilian refugees from Ciechanów in Łukowo.

=== 5 September ===
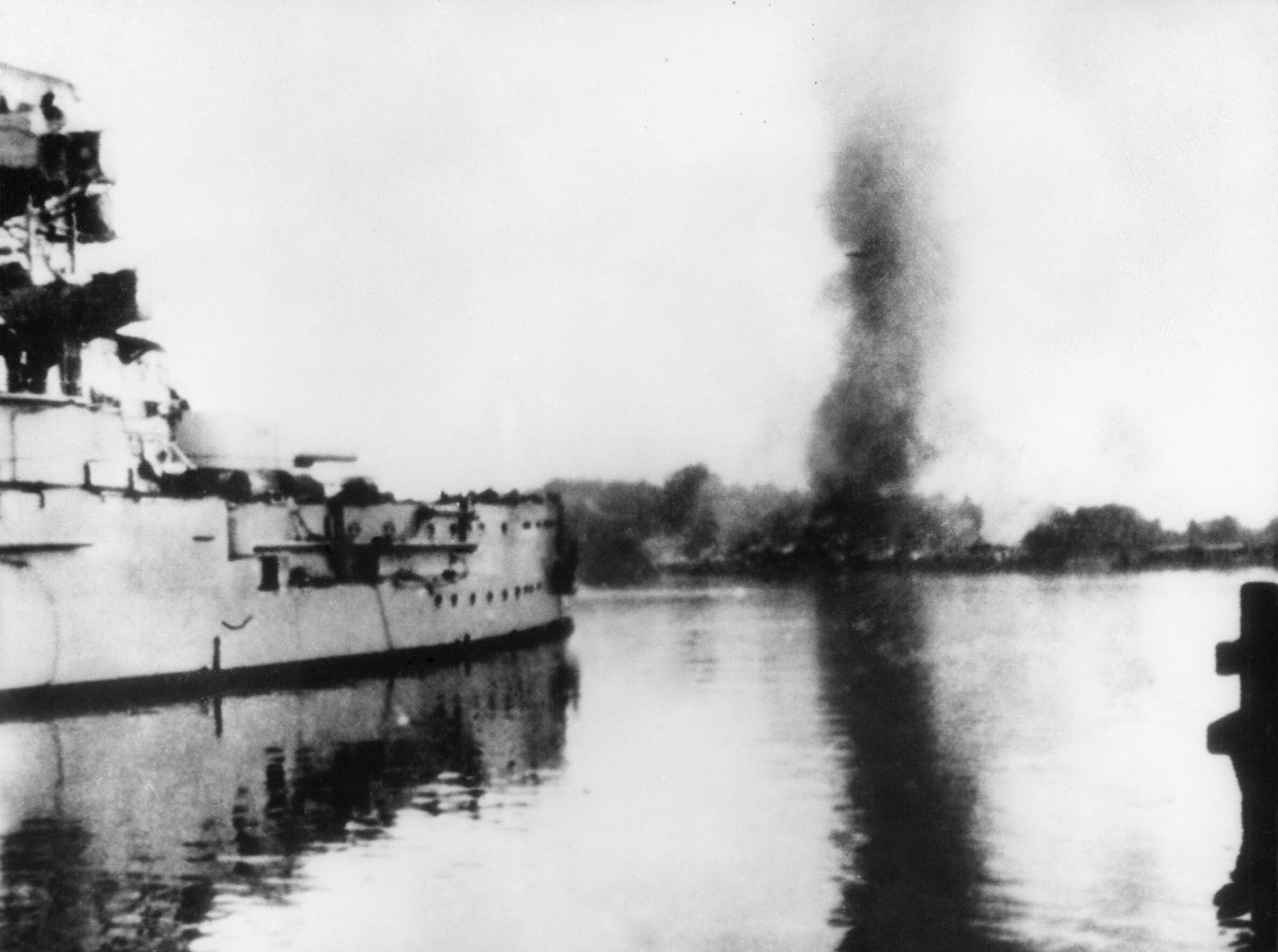
German battleship Schleswig-Holstein firing at Westerplatte, 5 September 1939

- Edward Rydz-Śmigły orders a general withdrawal by Army Prusy, Army Kraków, Army Poznań and Army Łódź to the east bank of the Vistula and behind the Dunajec.
- Rydz-Śmigły orders a counterattack by Wyszków Operational Group with 1st Legions Infantry Division and 33rd Infantry Division at 18:15, though his order does not reach the Operational Group's commander Kowalski until 06:00 the next day.
- German troops perpetrated a massacre of over 80 Polish POWs in Serock (see German atrocities committed against Polish prisoners of war).
- Battle of Kazimierza Wielka between the Polish 55th Infantry Division and Wehrmacht, town captured by the Germans.
- During the night of 5/6 September, the Polish defenders of Różan evacuate their positions.

=== 6 September ===
- Wyszków Operational Group begins its counterattack (as ordered on 5 September) towards Pułtusk against I Corps; 1st Legions Infantry Division and 61st Infantry Division clash.
- Corps Wodrig forces the Germans' way across the Narew river; the corps subsequently wastes time with preparations to attack Różan (already evacuated by Polish defenders during the night of 5/6 September).
- XXII Corps severs the line between Warsaw and Częstochowa.
- Krakow is captured by German forces.
- The Polish air force attempts a general offensive and musters 164 sorties with 13 victories and nine planes lost. In the evening, orders are given to move all remaining Polish fighters to Lublin, where 88 fighters are subsequently formed into the newly improvised Pursuit Brigade.
- The Polish government and its accredited ambassadors evacuate Warsaw and relocate to Lublin.
- Poles evacuate the arms factory in Starachowice to Kowel; Germans attack the Wanacja suburb of Starachowice, and then murder over 20 civilians.
- German troops perpetrated a massacre of Polish POWs, including 19 officers, in Moryca and Longinówka, and massacres of 56 Polish civilians in Będzin and Uniejów. They also burned the villages Komorów and Krasna, killing 28 inhabitants.
- During the night of 6/7 September, the Wyszków Operational Group's progress is significantly hampered by logistical chaos when the 33rd and 41st Infantry Divisions become hopelessly entangled with each other, causing mass confusion among the troops.

=== 7 September ===
- At 04:15 in the morning, Schleswig-Holstein opens the final bombardment against Westerplatte, whose defenders surrender around 10:15.
- Germans enter Starachowice and launch an attack on Ostrowiec Świętokrzyski.
- German troops carried out massacres in Mordarka, Wągrowiec and Wylazłów, killing 33 Poles and 9 Jews.
- Decision of the German Ministry of the Interior to dissolve the Union of Poles in Germany and close Polish minority schools, printing houses, and financial and cooperative institutions.

=== 8 September ===
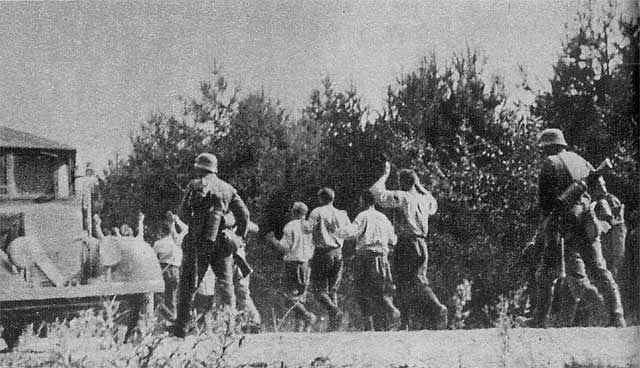
Polish POWs and German soldiers shortly before the Ciepielów massacre

- German forces reach the outskirts of Warsaw; probing attacks by the 4th Panzer Division, which had judged Warsaw to be undefended the previous day, meet heavy Polish resistance in the Ochota suburb.
- At 5:30 a.m., German forces launched an assault on Kłecko, capturing it in the evening, suffering heavy losses in the face of fierce Polish defense.
- German troops carried out massacres in Bagatele, Balin, Chechło, Czekaj, Dominikowice, Koźle, Lipsko, Międzylesie, Mszczonów, Siemianowice Śląskie, Tyszki-Ciągaczki, killing 179 Poles, including 11 POWs, and 60 Jews. Only in the Ciepielów massacre soldiers of the German 29th Infantry Division murdered some 300 Polish POWs.
- In preparation for the Soviet invasion of Poland, the NKVD ordered the establishment of operational groups, which would commit massacres of Polish POWs and civilians.

=== 9 September ===
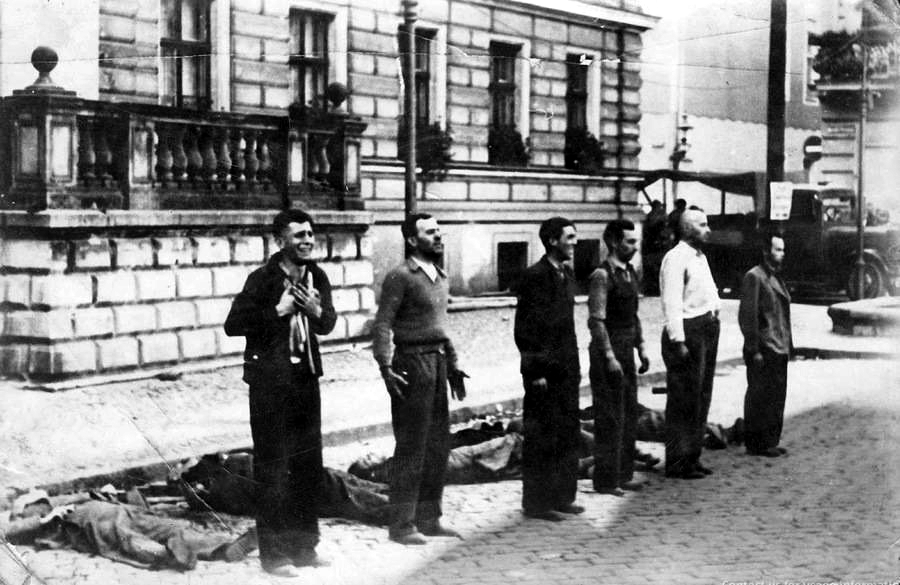
Public execution of Polish civilians in Bydgoszcz on 9 September 1939

- 4th Panzer Division repeats its attack against Warsaw; Panzer Regiment 35 suffers heavy casualties, leading to the eventual recall of 4th Panzer Division from the Warsaw sector.
- The German 8th Army captures Łódź, and subsequently advances against a concentration of Polish forces southwest of Warsaw that was giving XVI Corps of 10th Army significant trouble.
- German troops perpetrated massacres of around 80 Polish civilians in Kłecko, Mielno, Orło and Pniewo, and massacres of over 260 Jews in Będzin, Sławków and Wyszków.
- During the night of 9/10 September, the Poznan Army attempts a breakout attempt towards the south of Łódź and strikes the flank of the German 8th Army (primarily the 30th Infantry Division), achieving operational surprise against the Germans.
- The German 5th Panzer Division attacked Polish forces at Pacanów and Stopnica.

=== 10 September ===
- German 14th Army forces its way across the river San on both sides of Przemyśl. The gros of the 11th Polish Infantry Division is trapped inside Przemyśl.
- German troops capture Skierniewice and Kostrzyn.
- German troops perpetrated massacres in Bądków, Gniazdowo, Kłecko, Laski Szlacheckie, Piaseczno, Rawa Mazowiecka, Stare Rogowo and Zdziechowa, killing around 190 Poles, including 21 POWs.

=== 11 September ===
- Poland's submarines are ordered via radio to attempt the breakout to British waters, or to otherwise seek internment in neutral ports.
- II Corps approaches Modlin Fortress, where parts of the corps settle in to besiege the defenders, while the main body of the corps advances towards Dębe.
- German troops perpetrated massacres in Jankowo Dolne, Karczew, Mogilno, Mszczonów, Niewolno, Obora, Orchowo, Padniewko, Skierniewice and Wągrowiec, killing 243 Poles, including women and children.

=== 12 September ===
- The German 207th Infantry Division breaks Polish positions at Reda and forces the Land Coastal Command to withdraw to Kępa Oksywsk.
- Wilhelm Canaris warns Wilhelm Keitel that the SS is making urgent preparations for imminent mass executions in German-occupied Poland; Keitel responds that these executions are approved by Hitler and that the Wehrmacht must tolerate them.
- Germans capture Sandomierz.
- German troops carried out massacres in Bartoszewice, Koźmice Wielkie, Kraków, Łagiewniki, Parma, Sadówka, Stare Kozłowice and Szczucin, killing some 150 Poles, including over 40 POWs, and 42 Jews.

=== 13 September ===
- The German Group Kaupisch enters Gdynia (Polish remnant resistance in the city continues until 19 September).
- Luftwaffe formations are concentrated against the area northeast of Łódź, where Polish marching columns make for appealing targets.
- German troops carried out massacres in Cecylówka, Kokoszkowy, Łowicz and Mień, killing over 80 Poles, including boy scouts, and at least 12 Jews.
- The majority of Poland's gold reserve stored by the Polish government in Śniatyn on the border with Romania.

=== 14 September ===
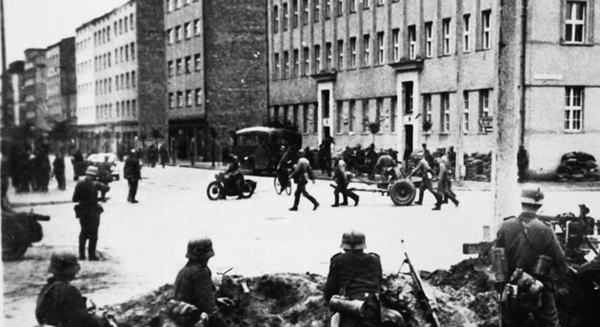
German forces in Gdynia, 14 September

- Reinhard Heydrich explains his own views on the "Jewish problem" in Poland to leaders of the Sicherheitspolizei.
- The Polish submarine Orzel requests access to Tallinn in neutral Estonia, which it receives on 01:03, on the morning of 15 September.
- German troops carried out massacres in Moskwin and Olszewo, killing 30 Polish POWs and 32 civilians.
- Poland's gold reserve evacuated from Śniatyn to Romania.
- The Soviet Kyiv Military District is ordered to achieve military readiness against Poland by 16 September.

=== 15 September ===
- XVIII Corps captures the fortress at Przemyśl.
- German police and army arrested 7,000 Poles in Gdynia.
- German troops carried out massacres in Sulejówek and Długa Szlachecka, killing over 90 Poles.

=== 16 September ===
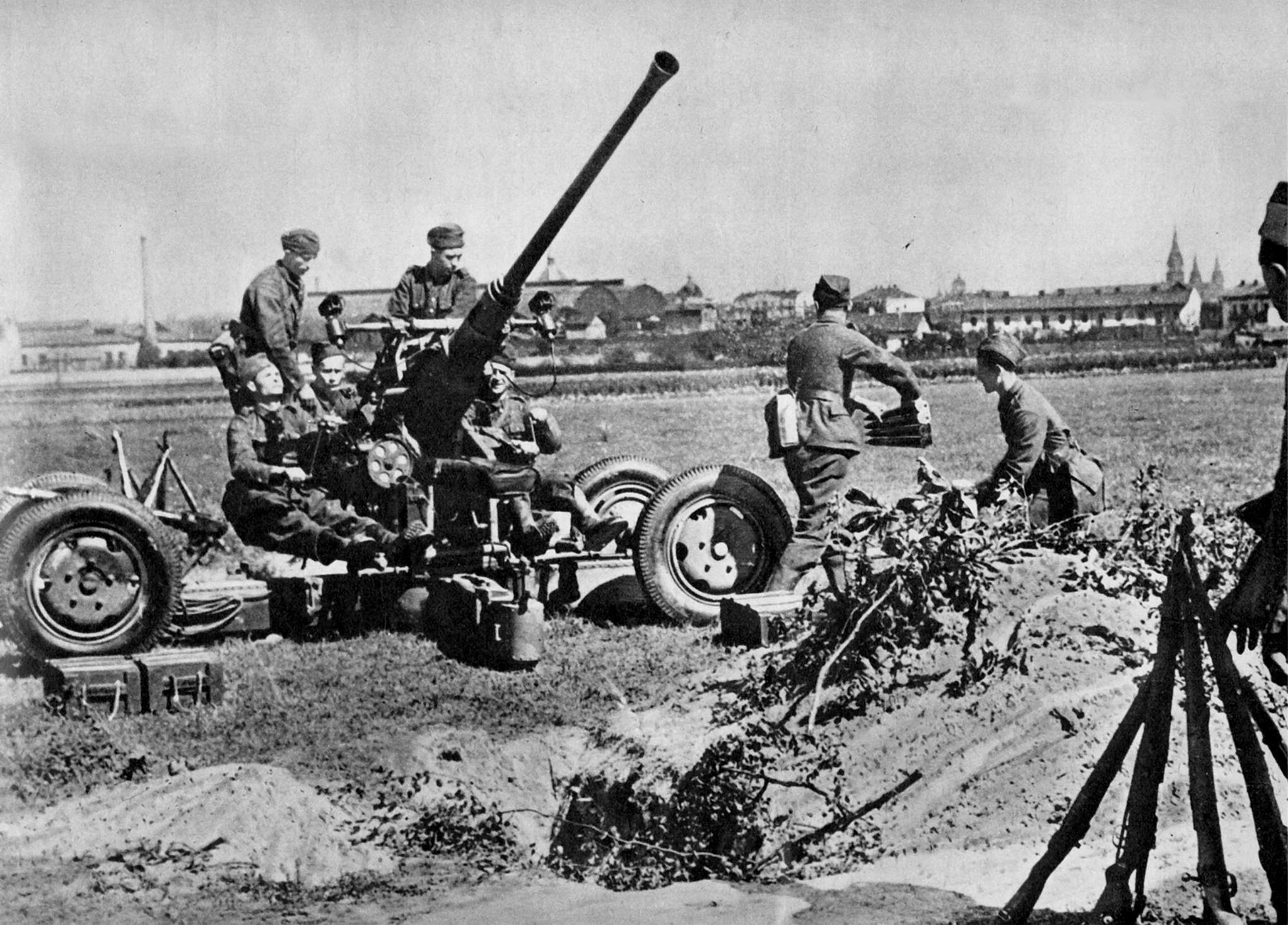
Polish Anti-aircraft Bofors 40 mm in the Battle of Lwów

- 4th Panzer Division attempts to cross the Bzura river to attack the Poznan Army in its German-encircled position, but is beaten back; Panzer Regiment 36 and SS Leibstandarte are temporarily trapped by Polish forces.
- German attackers are repulsed at Lwów.
- German troops perpetrated massacres in Bocheń, Guźnia and Retki, killing 49 Polish civilians.
- Order No. 005 of the Soviet Minsk Military District is read out to Soviet troops, promising them the "liberation of Ukrainian and Belarussian workers from Polish landowners and capitalists".

=== 17 September ===
- In the Soviet invasion of Poland, the Red Army intervenes in the German-Polish war on the German side, beginning its advance towards the German-Soviet demarcation line agreed in the Molotov-Ribbentrop Pact.
- Polish defense of Sarny against the Soviets begins.
- Presidential proclamation of Ignacy Mościcki in Kuty.
- Rydz-Śmigły instructs Polish units in eastern Poland to avoid combat with the Red Army as far as possible and to withdraw towards the national frontiers with Romania and Hungary.
- XV Corps (of 10th Army) crosses the Warsaw—Sochaczew road and further tightens the chokehold around Warsaw.
- German troops perpetrated massacres in Bąków, Henryków, Leszno in Mazovia, killing 144 Polish civilians, including women and children, whereas in Piekary Śląskie and Strzybnica in Silesia the German police and Freikorps executed 12 Polish civilians.

=== 18 September ===
- The main clashes of the Battle of the Bzura cease; OKH reports 120,000+ Polish prisoners from a total of 19 divisions and three cavalry brigades.
- Following Soviet pressure against the Estonian government, Orzel leaves Tallinn and begins its breakout towards the United Kingdom, which it would reach (without maps) on 14 October.
- Germans perpetrated a massacre of some 300 Poles, including POWs and refugees, in Śladów.

=== 19 September ===
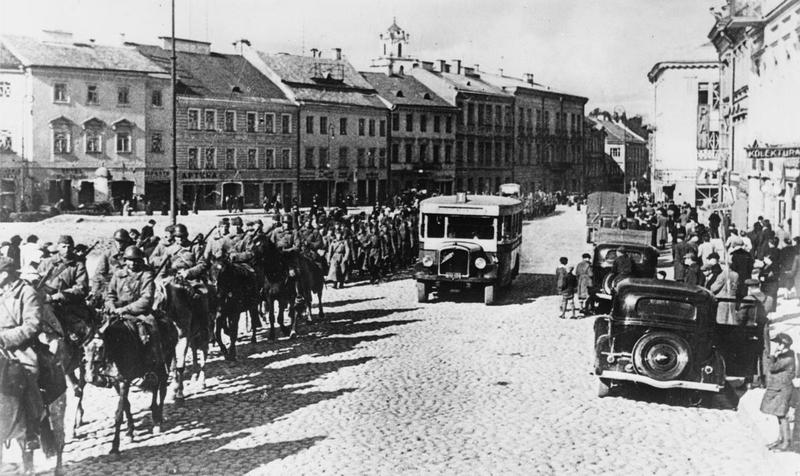
Soviet troops enter Wilno, 19 September

- German forces complete the encirclement of Warsaw, ending what the Germans would subsequently dub the "Eighteen Days Campaign".
- Krakow Army attempts a breakout towards the Romanian frontier through Tomaszow Lubelski.
- Pomorze Army and Poznan Army are forced to surrender.
- Wilno taken by the Soviets after the Battle of Wilno.

=== 20 September ===
- Army Group South is ordered to abort its attacks and to withdraw west of the Vistula-San line to make space for the advancing Soviets. The German siege of Lwów is aborted and left to the Soviets. A German attack against the city by XVIII Army Corps planned for 21 September is cancelled.
- Clashes between Polish and Soviet forces at Grodno ("Battle of Grodno").
- German troops carried out massacres of 42 Polish POWs in Majdan Wielki and 8 Poles in Białystok.
- White Eagle Organization (Organizacja Orła Białego) Polish resistance organization founded on 20–22 September in Kraków.

=== 21 September ===
- Polish garrison of Lviv unexpectedly attempts surrender to the withdrawing Germans; occupation of Lviv is left to the Soviets, who take the city after an artillery bombardment.
- Reinhard Heydrich issues a directive to begin the concentration of Poland's Jews in the major cities to prepare the formation of ghettos and to ease subsequent deportations to concentration camps.

=== 22 September ===
- German–Soviet parade in Brześć.
- The Germans handed over Białystok to the Soviets in accordance with the Molotov–Ribbentrop Pact.
- Soviets carry out arrests of Polish officers in Lwów despite previous agreements and guarantees of freedom and inviolability.
- Polish General Józef Olszyna-Wilczyński executed by the Soviets in Sopoćkinie.
- Polish Organization for the Struggle for Freedom (Polska Organizacja Walki o Wolność) Polish resistance organization begins forming in Lwów.
- German troops carried out a massacre of 50 Polish POWs in Boryszew. On the same day between 73 and 100 Polish POWs were burned alive in the village of Urycz.
- Soviets carried out a massacre of over 100 Polish POWs and 300 Polish civilians in Psia Górka.
- Germans carried out the first mass execution of 88 patients of the Kocborowo psychiatric hospital at the Forest of Szpęgawsk.

=== 23 September ===
- Soviets carried out a massacre of 25 Polish POWs in Husynne.

=== 24 September ===
- Johannes Blaskowitz (of German 8th Army) orders the final assault against Warsaw.
- Appointed German Kreisleiter called Polish municipal officials in Bydgoszcz to a supposed formal meeting in the city hall, from where they were taken to a forest near Bydgoszcz and exterminated. He also ordered the execution of their family members to "avoid creating martyrs".

=== 27 September ===
- Warsaw surrenders. Polish general Tadeusz Kutrzeba meets with Johannes Blaskowitz to discuss the terms of surrender.
- In the early morning, the 19th Uhlans are ambushed by a Soviet tank column, but manage to repel the initial assault.
- 26th Uhlans and 27th Uhlans are surprised by strong Soviet armored formations ("Battle of Władypol") and shatter. Small groups of survivors begin to fight their way to the Hungarian border, some 40 km away.
- Service for Poland's Victory and Grey Ranks Polish resistance organizations founded.

=== 28 September ===
- Soviet-Polish battle at Szack; 52nd Rifle Division and 411th Tank Battalion forced in temporary retreats by Polish defenders.
- Germany and the Soviet Union sign a Border and Friendship Treaty and adjust the frontiers of occupied Poland. The Soviet Union publicly blames the Western Allies for the continuation of the war.
- Germans carried out the second mass execution, this time of 16 patients of the Kocborowo psychiatric hospital, at the Forest of Szpęgawsk.
- Soviets carried out a massacre of 18 Polish POWs from the Riverine Flotilla of the Polish Navy in Mokrany.

=== 29 September ===
- The Polish garrison of Modlin fortress surrenders at 08:00; the roughly 35,000 defenders (including 4,000 wounded) are released as agreed in the surrender agreement, though most officers are subsequently recaptured in the following weeks and detained in POW camps.
- Wounded General Władysław Anders taken prisoner by the Soviets.

=== 30 September ===
- General Sikorski forms a Polish government-in-exile in France.

== October ==
=== 1 October ===
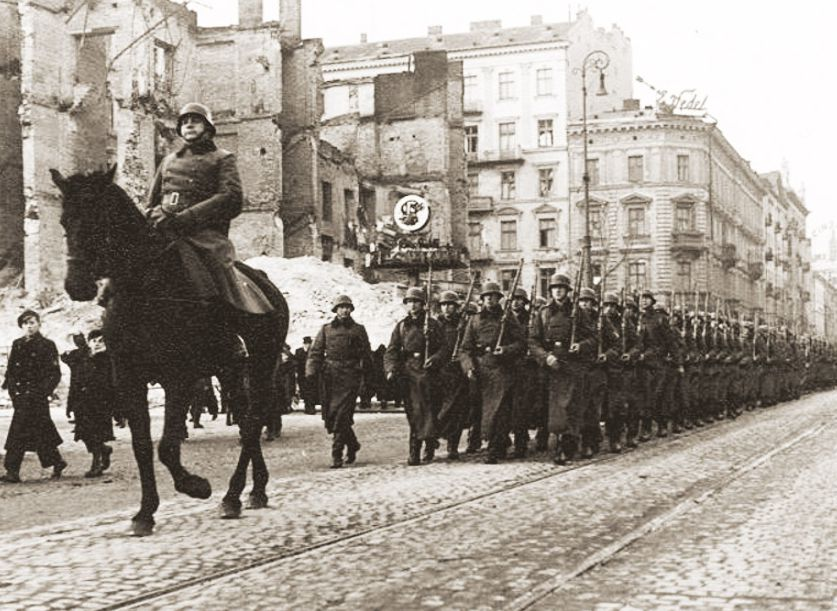
German troops enter Warsaw, 1 October 1939

- Around 02:00 at night, a Polish vanguard of the Border Protection Corps meets a column of Soviet tanks near Wytyczno and destroys four of them. As the BPC crosses the Bug river south of Włodawa to catch up with Independent Operational Group Polesie forces, a Soviet counterattack ("Battle of Wytyczno") commences in the early morning. General Wilhelm Orlik-Rückemann decides to break up his force into small units and send them into various directions. Several massacres are subsequently committed by the Soviet pursuers against Polish groups of soldiers.
- After a final assault against Hel by the German Infantry Regiment 374 towards Hel, the Polish commander asks for an armistice around 14:00.
- At 14:30, the German mineseeker M85 is sunk by the Polish submarine Zbik with 23 lives lost, sole Polish submarine victory of the campaign.
- Ger. 10th Army is alerted to return to Germany to prepare operations against France.
- Germans carried out a massacre of 64 Polish men, including ten boys under the age of 18, in Szczuczki.
- Polish Consul in Kyiv Jerzy Matusiński was summoned for supposed talks at the Representation Office of the People's Commissariat for Foreign Affairs, and then arrested by the Soviets, with his fate unknown to this day.

=== 2 October ===
- Command of the Defenders of Poland (Komenda Obrońców Polski) Polish resistance organization founded in Warsaw.

=== 3 October ===
- Gerd von Rundstedt becomes military commander in German-occupied Poland.

=== 4 October ===
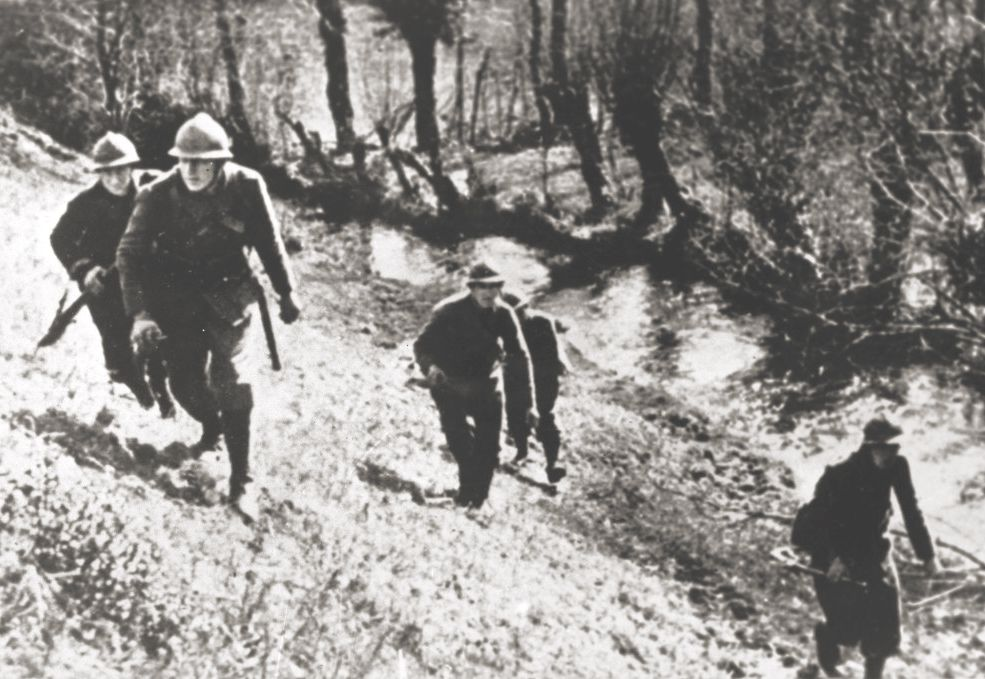
Polish soldiers during the Battle of Kock

- The final clashes of the campaign erupt in the Battle of Kock.
- Adolf Hitler issues a general armistice for any war crimes committed by German troops during the campaign against Poland.
- German massacres of Poles in Paterek, committed as part of the Intelligenzaktion campaign begin.

=== 5 October ===
- The Germans hold the first of their victory campaigns in Warsaw, which is filmed by Leni Riefenstahl.
- Around 19:30, General Kleeberg (the commander of the last active Polish formations in the Kock sector) gives orders to cease fighting.
- The Germans carried out an execution of 39 Poles, defenders of the Polish Post Office in Gdansk in Zaspa.
- On 5–6 October, the Germans perpetrated a massacre of Poles from Koronowo and adjacent villages at Buszkowo.

=== 6 October ===
- The final Polish resistance (around two divisions in strength, under General Kleeberg around Kock) surrender, ending the campaign.

== See also ==
- Timeline of World War II
- Timeline of Polish history

== Bibliography ==
- Agresja sowiecka na Polskę i okupacja wschodnich terenów Rzeczypospolitej 1939–1941 (in Polish). Białystok-Warszawa: IPN. 2019. ISBN 978-83-8098-706-7.
- Encyklopedia konspiracji Wielkopolskiej 1939–1945 (in Polish). Poznań: Instytut Zachodni. 1998. ISBN 83-85003-97-5.
- Bartniczak, Mieczysław (1974). "Eksterminacja ludności w powiecie Ostrów Mazowiecka w latach okupacji hitlerowskiej (1939–1944)". Rocznik Mazowiecki (in Polish). No. 5.
- Sudoł, Tomasz (2011). "Zbrodnie Wehrmachtu na jeńcach polskich we wrześniu 1939 roku". Biuletyn Instytutu Pamięci Narodowej (in Polish). No. 8-9 (129-130). IPN. ISSN 1641-9561.
- Trepka, Tomasz; Zawisza, Michał (2019). Ocalić od zapomnienia: Kielecczyzna 1939–1945 (in Polish). Warszawa: IPN. ISBN 978-83-8098-799-9.
- Wardzyńska, Maria (2009). Był rok 1939. Operacja niemieckiej policji bezpieczeństwa w Polsce. Intelligenzaktion (in Polish). Warszawa: IPN.
