= Rozalin =

Rozalin may refer to several places:

== Places ==
- Rozalin, Konin County in Greater Poland Voivodeship (west-central Poland)
- Rozalin, Słupca County in Greater Poland Voivodeship (west-central Poland)
- Rozalin, Lublin Voivodeship (east Poland)
- Rozalin, Pruszków County in Masovian Voivodeship (east-central Poland)
- Rozalin, Wołomin County in Masovian Voivodeship (east-central Poland)
- Rozalin, Wyszków County in Masovian Voivodeship (east-central Poland)
- Rozalin, Silesian Voivodeship (south Poland)
- Rozalin, Subcarpathian Voivodeship (south-east Poland)

== Other uses ==
- Liqueur rozalin, see rožata
