= German ultimatum =

German ultimatum may refer to:

- 1939 German ultimatum to Lithuania
- 1939 German ultimatum to Poland
- Godesberg Memorandum, 1938 German ultimatum to Czechoslovakia
