= Kleśniska =

- Village
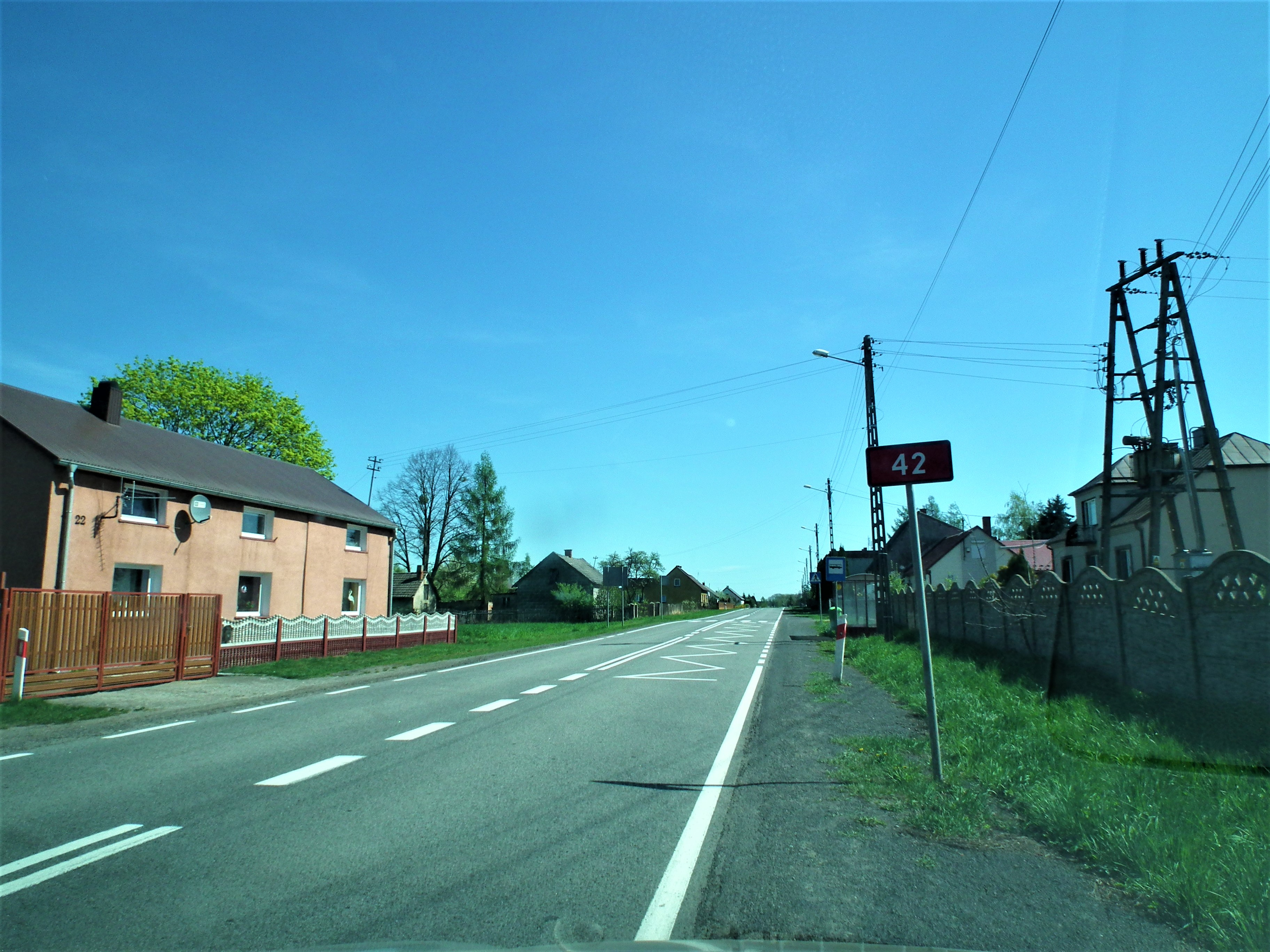

- Location within Poland
- Coordinates: 51°2′20″N 18°42′38″E
- Country: Poland
- Voivodeship: Silesian
- County: Kłobuck
- Gmina: Lipie
- Population: 468
- Website: http://www.klesniska.pl

Kleśniska [klɛɕˈniska] is a village in the administrative district of Gmina Lipie, within Kłobuck County, Silesian Voivodeship, in southern Poland.
