= Natolin, Silesian Voivodeship =

Natolin
- Village
- Location within Poland
- Coordinates: 51°0′N 18°45′E
- Country: Poland
- Voivodeship: Silesian
- County: Kłobuck
- Gmina: Lipie
- Population: 241

Natolin [naˈtɔlin] is a village in the administrative district of Gmina Lipie, within Kłobuck County, Silesian Voivodeship, in southern Poland.
