= 1939 German ultimatum to Poland =

German diplomatic demand on Poland

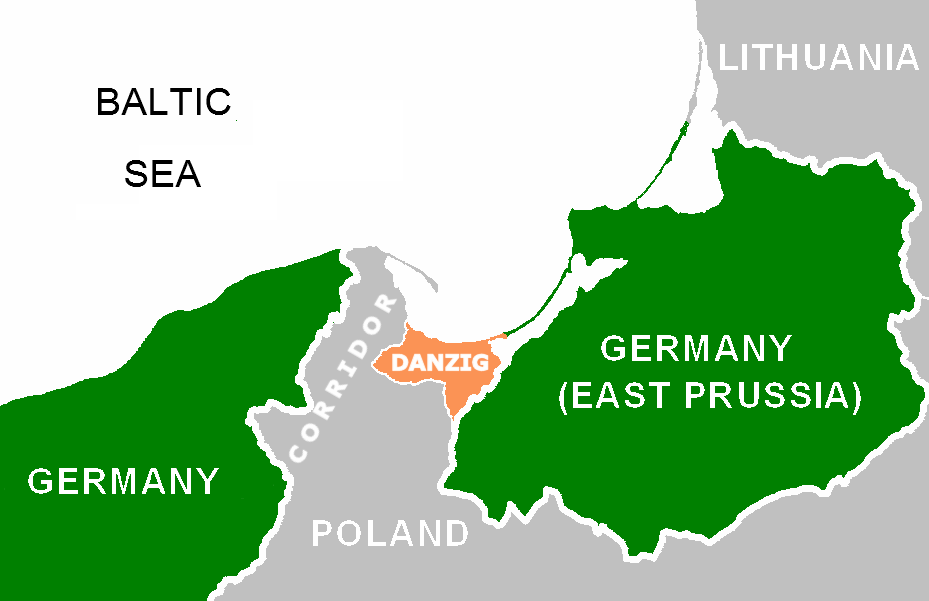
The Polish Corridor and Danzig 1923–1939

The 1939 German ultimatum to Poland refers to a list of 16 proposals by Nazi Germany to resolve the Danzig crisis, including a demand for the return of the Free City of Danzig to Germany and for a plebiscite to be held on the status of the Polish Corridor.

On August 29, Adolf Hitler asked the United Kingdom to instruct Poland to send a plenipotentiary to Berlin within 24 hours to negotiate a settlement of the Danzig crisis. The United Kingdom considered this an ultimatum with an unrealistic deadline and refused. Germany did not give Poland or the United Kingdom a copy of the 16 points until the deadline had expired. At 9 pm on August 31, German radio announced that Poland had rejected the German proposals, even though they were never officially presented to the Polish government. Like the false flag raid on the Gleiwitz radio station on the same day, Polish "rejection" of the ultimatum served as a pretext for the German invasion of Poland on September 1, which initiated the Second World War.

== Background ==
In the aftermath of World War I, as part of the Treaty of Versailles, Germany ceded the Polish Corridor to the newly-established Polish Republic and the city of Danzig and its nearby localities were declared a free city under the protection and oversight of the League of Nations.

Poland incorporated the Corridor into its own territory and Danzig was joined to it under a customs union in an effort to allow Poland "secure access to the sea."

The majority of the population of the Corridor was understood to be Polish, with a substantial German minority. Danzig, however, was largely populated by Germans. The substantial number of Germans in these territories caused tension between Germany, Poland, and Britain and France throughout the interwar period. Danzig, particularly, deeply injured German national pride and German nationalists spoke of "the open wound in the East" in reference to the Free City.

From March 1939, Adolf Hitler put increasing pressure on Poland to agree to the handover of Danzig to Germany, claiming that Poles were mistreating Germans in Danzig and Poland. Meanwhile, the German military developed plans for an invasion of Poland.

On August 23, 1939, Germany and the Soviet Union signed the Molotov–Ribbentrop Pact. This pact had a secret protocol that defined German and Soviet spheres of influence: Lithuania for Germany; Finland, Estonia, Latvia and Bessarabia for the Soviet Union; and Poland to be partitioned between the two powers.

The pact ensured that Germany would not face a war with the Soviet Union when it invaded Poland. Immediately afterwards, Hitler ordered the attack to proceed on 26 August, but upon hearing that the United Kingdom had concluded a formal mutual assistance pact with Poland and that Italy would maintain neutrality, he decided to delay it.

Germany offered Britain an alliance if Britain helped Germany gain Danzig, the Polish corridor and its former colonies. Britain replied that it would honour its guarantee to Poland and that Germany should negotiate directly with Poland to resolve their issues regarding Danzig, the Polish Corridor, and the alleged mistreatment of ethnic Germans in Poland.

== The ultimatum ==
On August 29, 1939, Hitler told British Ambassador Nevile Henderson that he was ready to resume negotiations with Poland. For this purpose, Hitler demanded that a Polish plenipotentiary come to Berlin within 24 hours.

In principle, Poland and Great Britain were ready to negotiate. However, Britain regarded the timeframe as so unrealistic, it amounted to an ultimatum. Britain refused to deliver the request to Poland.

As intended by Ribbentrop, the narrow time limit for acceptance of the ultimatum made it impracticable for the British government to contact the Polish government about the German request for a Polish plenipotentiary, let alone allow the Poles to prepare an envoy to arrive in Berlin and negotiate a solution to the Danzig issue the following day. This allowed Ribbentrop to claim that the Poles had rejected German proposals that neither the British or Poles had yet seen.

At midnight on August 30-31, the German Foreign Minister, Joachim von Ribbentrop, read the 16 point German proposal for resolving the Danzig crisis to Henderson. However, against all diplomatic custom, he refused to hand him the relevant document. Ribbentrop then stated that as no Polish representative had appeared by the German deadline, the proposal had become void anyway.

In the morning of August 31, the Swedish businessman Birger Dahlerus, an unofficial emissary of Herman Göring, gave the British a copy of the German proposals. At 11 am, Dahlerus met the Polish Ambassador, Józef Lipski, but Lipski refused to accept any representations from him as he had no diplomatic accreditation.

At noon Lipski appeared at the German Foreign Office and sought an audience with Ribbentrop. Five hours later he was shown in, but since he did not have the negotiating authority demanded by Hitler, Ribbentrop quickly dismissed him, telling him that he would inform the "Führer" of this. At 9 pm, German radio announced the Polish "rejection" of Germany's 16 point proposal although, by this time, Hitler had already given the order to attack Poland on September 1.

In his 1 September speech to the Reichstag announcing war with Poland, Hitler cited false-flag border incidents and Poland's "refusal" to negotiate as justification for Germany's "defensive" action against Poland:

I have also tried to solve the problem of Danzig, the Corridor, etc., by proposing a peaceful discussion... In my talks with Polish statesmen I discussed the ideas which you recognise from my last speech to the Reichstag... there is nothing more modest or loyal than these proposals... These proposals have been refused. Not only were they answered first with mobilisation, but with increased terror and pressure against our German compatriots... Poland was not prepared to settle the Corridor question in a reasonable way... I made one more final effort to accept a proposal for mediation... For two whole days I sat with my Government and waited to see whether it was convenient for the Polish Government to send a plenipotentiary or not... But I am wrongly judged if my love of peace and my patience are mistaken for weakness or even cowardice... These proposals for mediation have failed... I can no longer find any willingness on the part of the Polish Government to conduct serious negotiations with us... Recently in one night, there were as many as twenty-one frontier incidents: last night there were fourteen, of which three were quite serious. I have, therefore, resolved to speak to Poland in the same language that Poland for months past has used toward us... I will continue this struggle, no matter against whom, until the safety of the Reich and its rights are secured.

== The sixteen points ==
1. Because of its purely German character and the unanimous will of its population, the Free City of Danzig shall be returned forthwith to the German Reich.
2. The territory known as the Polish Corridor, that is to say, the territory bounded by the Baltic Sea and a line running from Marienwerder to Graudenz, Kulm, Bromberg, (including these towns), and then in a westerly direction towards Schönlanke, shall itself decide whether it shall become part of the German Reich or remain with Poland.
3. For that purpose, a plebiscite shall be held in this territory. All Germans who were domiciled in this area on January 1, 1918, or who were born there on or before that day, and also all Poles, Cassubians, etc., who were domiciled in this area on that day or who were born there on or before the above-mentioned date, shall be entitled to vote. Germans who have been expelled from this territory shall return for the purpose of registering their votes.
  In order to ensure an impartial plebiscite and to guarantee that the necessary and extensive preparations for the plebiscite shall be carried out correctly, an International Commission like the one formed in connection with the Saar plebiscite, and consisting of members appointed by the four Great Powers, Italy, the U.S.S.R., France and Great Britain, shall be formed immediately, and placed in charge of this territory. This commission shall exercise sovereign rights throughout the territory. To that end, the territory shall be evacuated by the Polish military forces, by the Polish police and by the Polish authorities within the shortest possible time to be agreed upon.
4. The Polish port of Gdynia to the extent of the Polish settlement is not included in this area, but, as a matter of principle, is recognized as Polish territory.
  The details of the boundaries of this Polish port shall be decided on by Germany and Poland, and if necessary established by an International Court of Arbitration.
5. In order to allow for ample time for the necessary and extensive preparations for the carrying out of an impartial plebiscite, this plebiscite shall not take place before a period of twelve months has elapsed.
6. In order that during that period, Germany's lines of communication with East Prussia and Poland's access to the sea may be unrestrict-edly ensured, certain roads and railway lines shall be determined, in order to facilitate unobstructed transit. In this connection only such taxes may be levied as are necessary for the upkeep of the lines of communication and for the carrying out of transport.
7. The allocation of this territory shall be decided on by the absolute majority of the votes cast.
8. In order to secure, after the plebiscite (irrespective of the result thereof), Germany's unrestricted communication with the province of Danzig-East Prussia, and Poland's access to the sea, Germany shall, in case the territory be returned to Poland as a result of the plebiscite, be given an extraterritorial traffic zone running from, say, Bütow to Danzig or Dirschau, for the purpose of building a German motor highway (Reichsautobahn) and also a four-track railway line. The construction of the motor road and of the railway shall be carried out in such a manner that Polish lines of communication are not affected thereby, i.e., they are to be overbridged or underbridged. This zone shall be one kilometer in width and shall be German territory.
  Should the result of the plebiscite be in favor of Germany, Poland shall have the same rights as Germany would have had, to build an extraterritorial road and railway connection in order to secure her free and unrestricted access to her port of Gdynia.
9. In the event of the Polish Corridor being returned to the Reich, the latter declares herself prepared to arrange with Poland for an exchange of population, insofar as conditions in the Corridor lend themselves to such an exchange.
10. Any special rights claimed by Poland within the port of Danzig shall be negotiated on a parity basis in exchange for equal rights for Germany at the Port of Gdynia.
11. In order to avoid any sense of menace or danger on either side, Danzig and Gdynia shall henceforth have a purely commercial character; i.e., neither of these places shall be provided with means of military defense or fortifications.
12. The Peninsula of Hela, which according to the result of the plebiscite would be allocated either to Poland or to Germany, shall also be demilitarized in any case.
13. The German Government, having most serious complaints to make about the treatment of the minority by the Poles, and the Polish Government, considering themselves entitled to raise complaints against Germany, agree to investigate into all complaints about economic and personal damage, as well as other acts of terrorism.
  Germany and Poland bind themselves to indemnify the minorities on either side for any economic damages and other wrongs inflicted upon them since 1918; and/or to revoke all expropriations or otherwise to completely indemnify the respective person or persons for these and other encroachments upon economic life.
14. In order to free the Germans remaining in Poland, as well as the Poles remaining in Germany, from the feeling of being deprived of the benefits of international law, and above all to afford them the certainty of their not being made to take part in actions and in furnishing services of a kind not compatible with their national convictions, Germany and Poland mutually agree to safeguard the rights of their respective minorities by most comprehensive and binding agreements for the purpose of warranting these minorities the preservation, free development and cultivation of their national customs, habits and traditions, to grant them in particular and for that purpose the form of organization considered necessary by them. Both parties undertake not to draft the members of the minority into military service.
15. In case of an agreement being reached on the basis of these proposals, Germany and Poland declare themselves prepared immediately to order and carry out the demobilization of their respective armed forces.
16. Any additional measures required to hasten the carrying through of the above agreement shall be mutually agreed upon between Germany and Poland.

== Commentary ==
In 1959, the historian Karl Dietrich Erdmann expressed the view that Poland had refused "to show any objective accommodation in the questions that had to be settled since the unfortunate provisions of the Treaty of Versailles". In doing so, it had weakened its own "moral position" in the face of German "impositions against Polish integrity and independence." In contrast, the historian Klaus Hildebrand points out that the German offer of negotiations was only made as an alibi to its own population. Its decision to go to war had been made long ago. According to Hermann Graml, the 16 points were not intended as a basis for negotiations at all, but to let them "burst." Peter Longerich also emphasizes the "purely propagandistic character" of the 16-point memorandum, since the Germans gave neither the Polish nor the British side the opportunity to comment on it before they began their invasion.

The American historian Gerhard Weinberg described the Henderson–Ribbentrop meeting regarding the ultimatum:

When Joachim von Ribbentrop refused to give a copy of the German demands to the British Ambassador [Henderson] at midnight of 30–31 August 1939, the two almost came to blows. Ambassador Henderson, who had long advocated concessions to Germany, recognized that here was a deliberately conceived alibi the German government had prepared for a war it was determined to start. No wonder Henderson was angry; von Ribbentrop on the other hand could see war ahead and went home beaming.
