= Julianów, Silesian Voivodeship =

Julianów
- Village
- Location within Poland
- Coordinates: 51°3′24″N 18°52′28″E
- Country: Poland
- Voivodeship: Silesian
- County: Kłobuck
- Gmina: Lipie
- Population: 221

Julianów [juˈljanuf] is a village in the administrative district of Gmina Lipie, within Kłobuck County, Silesian Voivodeship, in southern Poland.
