= Grabarze =

- Village
- Location within Poland
- Coordinates: 51°3′51″N 18°46′47″E
- Country: Poland
- Voivodeship: Silesian
- County: Kłobuck
- Gmina: Lipie
- Population: 132

Grabarze [ɡraˈbaʐɛ] is a village in the administrative district of Gmina Lipie, within Kłobuck County, Silesian Voivodeship, in southern Poland.
