= Zbrojewsko =

- Village
- Location within Poland
- Coordinates: 50°59′51″N 18°44′43″E
- Country: Poland
- Voivodeship: Silesian
- County: Kłobuck
- Gmina: Lipie
- Population: 254
- Time zone: UTC+1 (CET)
  - Summer (DST): UTC+2 (CEST)
- Vehicle registration: SKL

Zbrojewsko [zbrɔˈjɛfskɔ] is a village in the administrative district of Gmina Lipie, within Kłobuck County, Silesian Voivodeship, in southern Poland.

Zbrojewsko was the location of a motte-and-bailey castle from the 14th century, which is now an archaeological site. Since the 1950s, archaeologists discovered tools and a bell-grave from the early Iron Age at the site.

== Transport ==
The Polish National road 43 runs nearby, south of the village.
