= Brzózki, Gmina Lipie =

Brzózki
- Village
- Location within Poland
- Coordinates: 51°0′50″N 18°44′28″E
- Country: Poland
- Voivodeship: Silesian
- County: Kłobuck
- Gmina: Lipie
- Population: 98

Brzózki [ˈbʐuski] is a village in the administrative district of Gmina Lipie, within Kłobuck County, Silesian Voivodeship, in southern Poland.
