= Wapiennik, Gmina Lipie =

Wapiennik
- Village
- Location within Poland
- Coordinates: 51°2′N 18°50′E
- Country: Poland
- Voivodeship: Silesian
- County: Kłobuck
- Gmina: Lipie
- Population: 229

Wapiennik [vaˈpjɛnnik] is a village in the administrative district of Gmina Lipie, within Kłobuck County, Silesian Voivodeship, in southern Poland.
