= Lindów, Silesian Voivodeship =

Lindów
- Village
- Location within Poland
- Coordinates: 51°2′53″N 18°51′46″E
- Country: Poland
- Voivodeship: Silesian
- County: Kłobuck
- Gmina: Lipie
- Population: 223

Lindów [ˈlinduf] is a village in the administrative district of Gmina Lipie, within Kłobuck County, Silesian Voivodeship, in southern Poland.
