= Lipie, Kłobuck County =

Lipie
- Village
- Location within Poland
- Coordinates: 51°0′42″N 18°48′3″E
- Country: Poland
- Voivodeship: Silesian
- County: Kłobuck
- Gmina: Lipie
- Population: 1,117

Lipie [ˈlipjɛ] is a village in Kłobuck County, Silesian Voivodeship, in southern Poland. It is the seat of the gmina (administrative district) called Gmina Lipie.
