= Rębielice Szlacheckie =

- Village
- Location within Poland
- Coordinates: 51°1′N 18°51′E
- Country: Poland
- Voivodeship: Silesian
- County: Kłobuck
- Gmina: Lipie
- Population: 474

Rębielice Szlacheckie [rɛmbjɛˈlit͡sɛ ʂlaˈxɛt͡skʲɛ] is a village in the administrative district of Gmina Lipie, within Kłobuck County, Silesian Voivodeship, in southern Poland.
