= Chwałęcice =

- Rybnik District
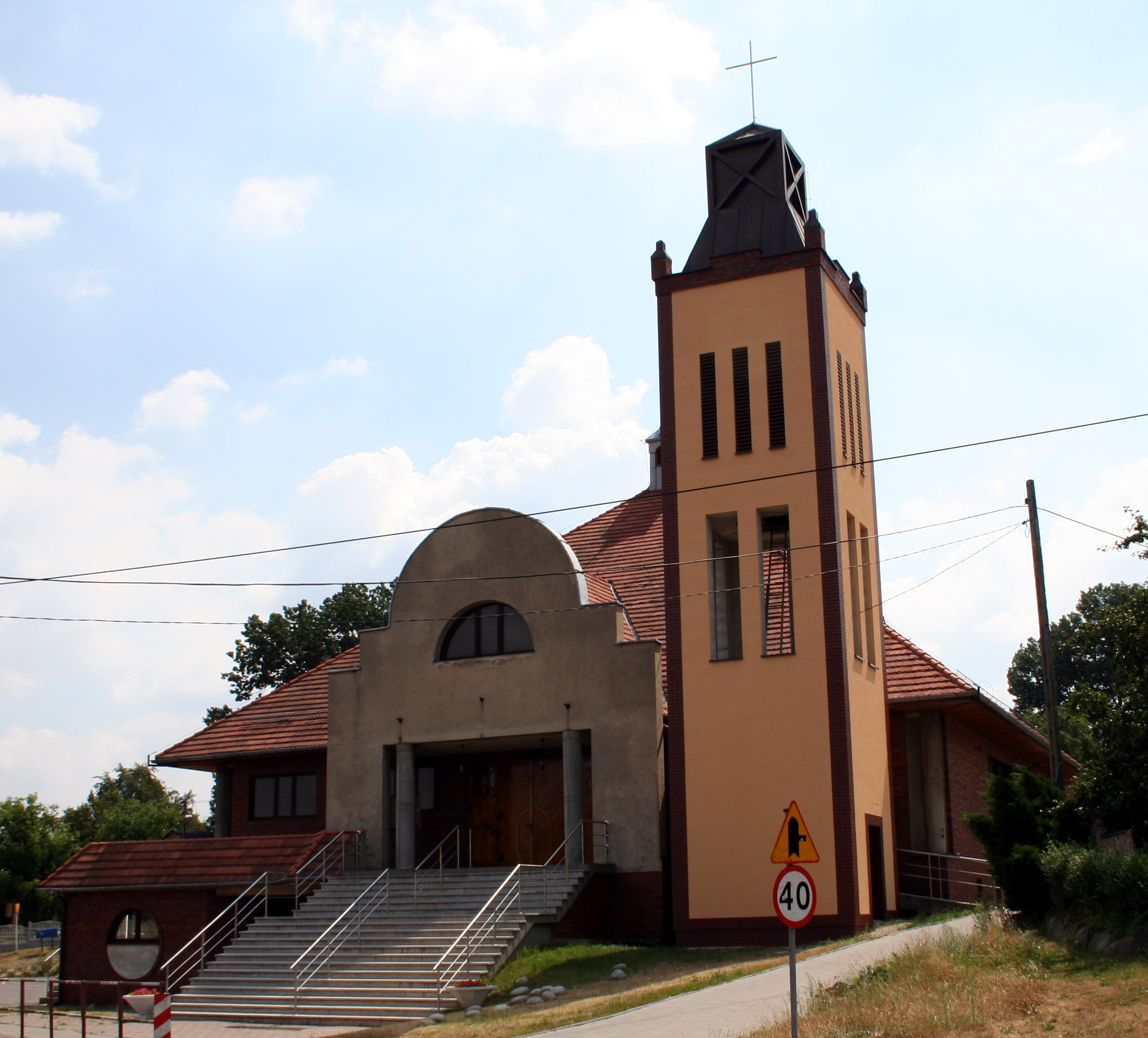
- Local Catholic church

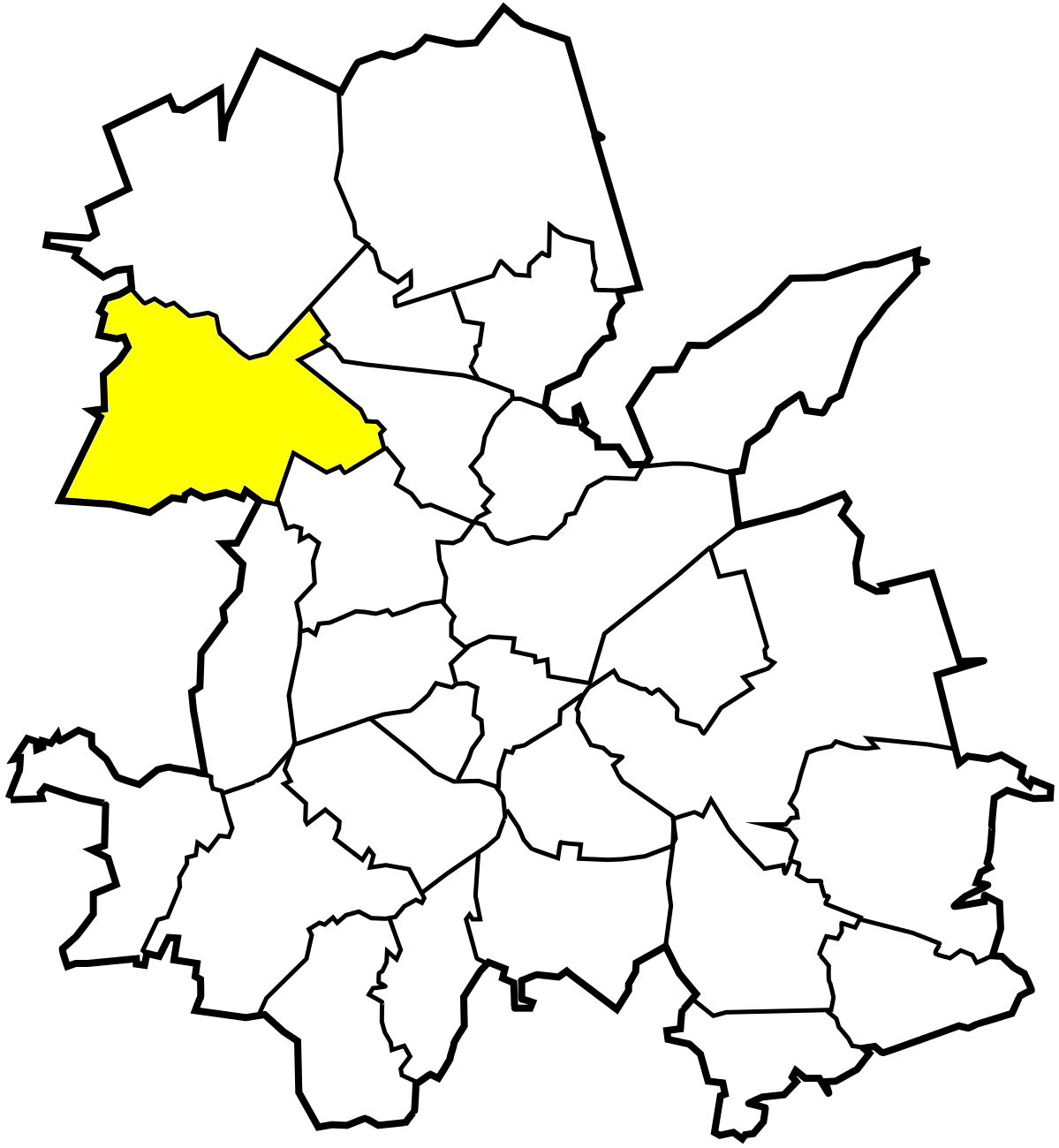
- Location of Chwałęcice within Rybnik
- Coordinates: 50.136515°N 18.480301°E
- Country: Poland
- Voivodeship: Silesian
- County/City: Rybnik

Population (2013)
  - Total: 1,800
- Time zone: UTC+1 (CET)
  - Summer (DST): UTC+2 (CEST)
- Area code: (+48) 032

Chwałęcice (German: Chwallentzitz) is a district of Rybnik, Silesian Voivodeship, southern Poland. In late 2013 it had about 1,800 inhabitants.

== History ==
Chwałęcice probably existed already in the 12th century.

After World War I in the Upper Silesia plebiscite, 233 out of 274 voters in Chwałęcice voted in favour of joining Poland, against 41 opting for staying in Germany. In 1922, it became a part of Silesian Voivodeship, Second Polish Republic. It was then annexed by Nazi Germany at the beginning of World War II. After the war, it was restored to Poland.

In the years 1973–1977, it was the seat of a gmina, which (Chwałęcice and Stodoły) was amalgamated with Rybnik on February 1, 1977.
