= Chałków =

- Village
- Location within Poland
- Coordinates: 51°2′15″N 18°48′26″E
- Country: Poland
- Voivodeship: Silesian
- County: Kłobuck
- Gmina: Lipie
- Population: 22

Chałków [ˈxau̯kuf] is a village in the administrative district of Gmina Lipie, within Kłobuck County, Silesian Voivodeship, in southern Poland.
