= Gmina Lipie =

Gmina Lipie Lipie Commune
- Gmina
- Flag Coat of arms
- Interactive map of Gmina Lipie
- Coordinates (Lipie): 51°0′42″N 18°48′3″E
- Country: Poland
- Voivodeship: Silesian
- County: Kłobuck
- Seat: Lipie

Area
  - Total: 99.07 km^{2} (38.25 sq mi)

Population (2019-06-30)
  - Total: 6,254
  - Density: 63.13/km^{2} (163.5/sq mi)
- Website: http://www.lipie.pl/

Gmina Lipie is a rural gmina (administrative district) in Kłobuck County, Silesian Voivodeship, in southern Poland. Its seat is the village of Lipie, which lies approximately 15 kilometres (9 mi) north-west of Kłobuck and 86 km (53 mi) north of the regional capital Katowice.

The gmina covers an area of 99.07 square kilometres (38.3 sq mi), and as of 2019 its total population is 6,254.

== Villages ==
Gmina Lipie contains the villages and settlements of Albertów, Brzózki, Chałków, Danków, Giętkowizna, Grabarze, Julianów, Kleśniska, Lindów, Lipie, Napoleon, Natolin, Parzymiechy, Rębielice Szlacheckie, Rozalin, Stanisławów, Szyszków, Troniny, Wapiennik, Zbrojewsko and Zimnowoda.

== Neighbouring gminas ==
Gmina Lipie is bordered by the gminas of Działoszyn, Krzepice, Opatów, Pątnów, Popów and Rudniki.
