= Stodoły, Rybnik =

Stodoły
- Rybnik District
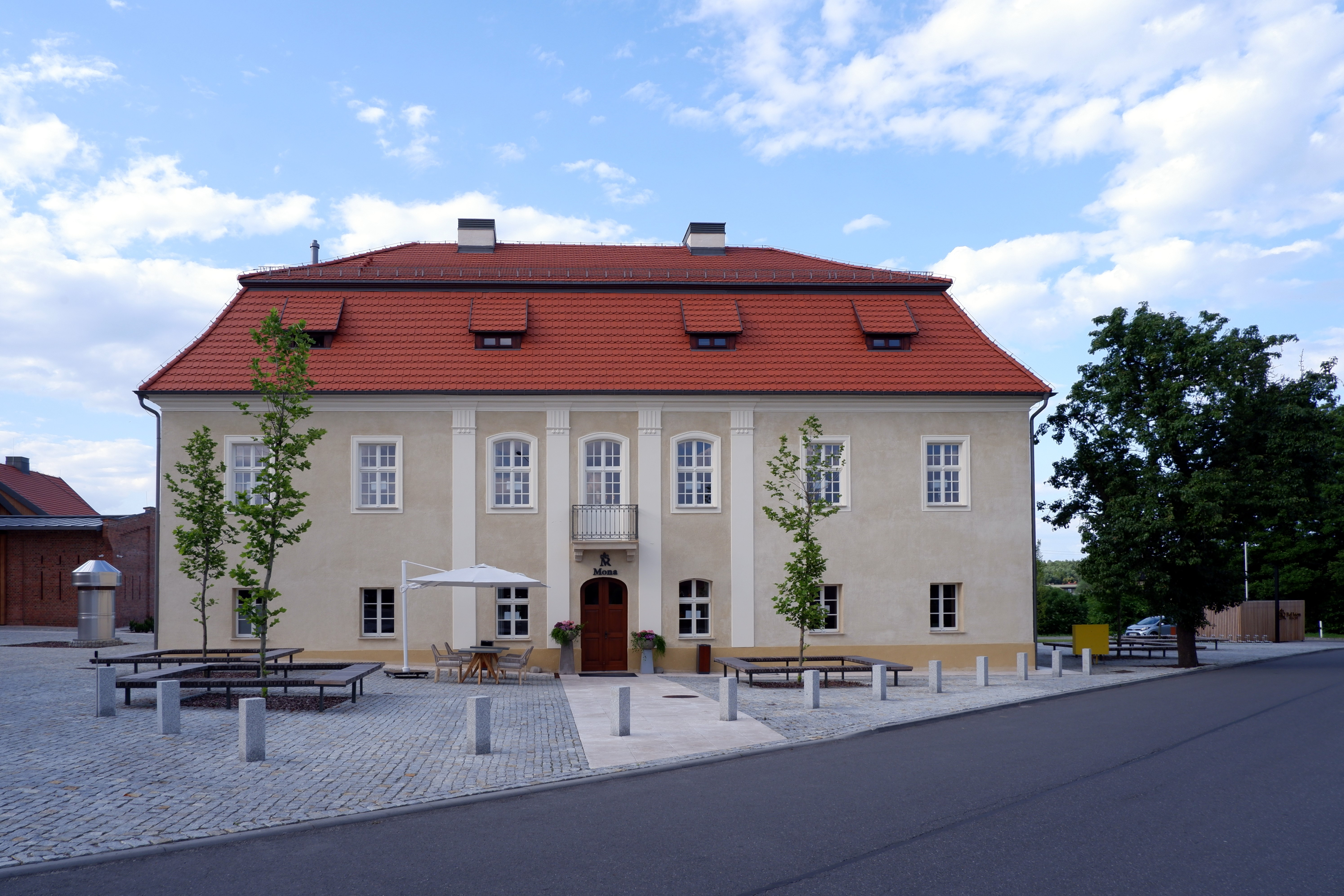
- Manor house

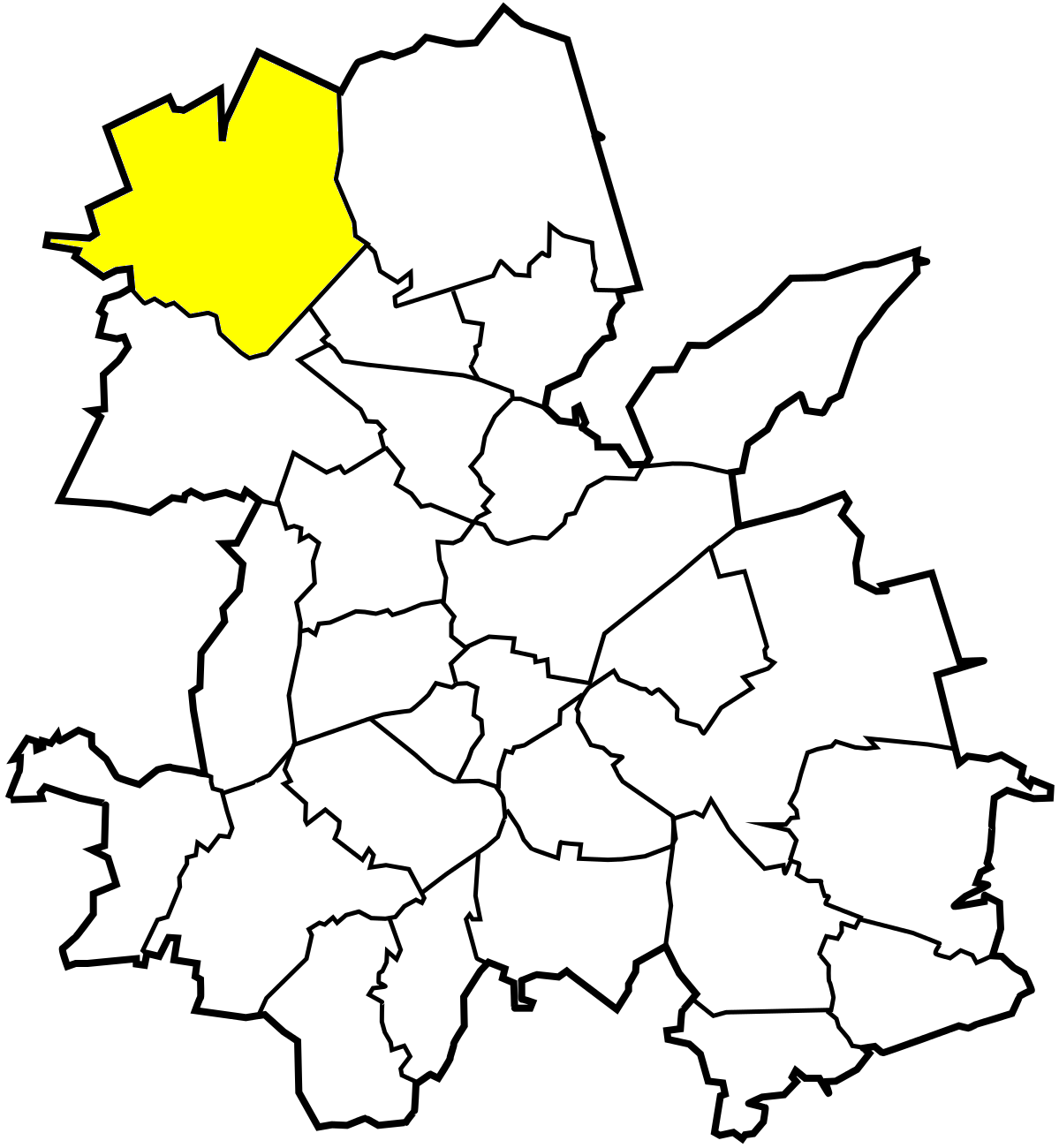
- Location of Stodoły within Rybnik
- Coordinates: 50.157206°N 18.483113°E
- Country: Poland
- Voivodeship: Silesian
- County/City: Rybnik

Population (2013)
  - Total: 600
- Time zone: UTC+1 (CET)
  - Summer (DST): UTC+2 (CEST)
- Area code: (+48) 032

Stodoły [stɔˈdɔwɨ] (lit. barns, German: Stodoll) is a district of Rybnik, Silesian Voivodeship, southern Poland. In the late 2013 it had about 600 inhabitants.

== History ==
The village could have existed before 1258.

After World War I in the Upper Silesia plebiscite 260 out of 393 voters in Stodoły voted in favour of joining Poland, against 131 opting for staying in Germany. Nevertheless it stayed a part of Germany, on the border with Poland. It was renamed as "Hochlinden" after campaign of cleansing "Non-German" place names in 1936. It was a place of a Nazi false flag operation (as part of Operation Himmler) on August 31, 1939. After the war it became a part of Poland.

In years 1973-1977 it was a part of gmina Chwałęcice and was amalgamated with Rybnik on February 1, 1977.
