= Zimnowoda, Silesian Voivodeship =

Zimnowoda
- Village
- Location within Poland
- Coordinates: 51°1′34″N 18°43′35″E
- Country: Poland
- Voivodeship: Silesian
- County: Kłobuck
- Gmina: Lipie
- Population: 565
- Time zone: UTC+1 (CET)
  - Summer (DST): UTC+2 (CEST)
- Vehicle registration: SKL

Zimnowoda [ʑimnɔˈvɔda] is a village in the administrative district of Gmina Lipie, within Kłobuck County, Silesian Voivodeship, in southern Poland.

== History ==
During the German invasion of Poland, which started World War II, on September 2, 1939, the Germans carried out a massacre of 38 Polish inhabitants, including 10 children (the Zimnowoda and Parzymiechy massacre, see also Nazi crimes against the Polish nation).
