= 1 September 1939 Reichstag speech =

Speech by Adolf Hitler

Adolf Hitler at the Reichstag, 1 September 1939. For this speech, Hitler wore a field-grey military uniform, conforming with the Generalissimo rank he was assuming, rather than the brown Nazi Party uniform that he had worn for earlier speeches.

The 1 September 1939 Reichstag speech is a speech made by Adolf Hitler at an Extraordinary Session of the German Reichstag on the day of the German invasion of Poland. The speech served as public declaration of war against Poland and thus of the commencement of World War II (Germany did not submit a formal declaration of war to Poland).

== Background ==
The first shots of the invasion had been fired at around 4:48 am of 1 September, by the German battleship Schleswig-Holstein. At 5:40 am, Hitler issued a declaration to the armed forces: "The Polish state has refused the peaceful settlement of relations which I desired, and appealed to arms... In order to put an end to this lunacy I have no other choice than to meet force with force from now on." This was followed by his speech to the Reichstag, meeting at the Kroll Opera House, at about 11:00 AM.

Preparations were made – barricades and police – for an expected spontaneous and enthusiastic crowd along Hitler's route to the Opera House. But only a handful of people showed up, and Berliners were largely apathetic, even grim, and showed no enthusiasm for the war.

== Speech ==
The speech followed Hitler's usual pattern, starting out slowly and even haltingly, then proceeding in stages to a crescendo of shouted vituperation. Although some statements in the speech were true, Hitler misrepresented in detail the course of diplomatic events preceding the invasion:

I have also tried to solve the problem of Danzig, the Corridor, etc., by proposing a peaceful discussion... In my talks with Polish statesmen I discussed the ideas which you recognise from my last speech to the Reichstag... there is nothing more modest or loyal than these proposals... These proposals have been refused. Not only were they answered first with mobilisation, but with increased terror and pressure against our German compatriots... Poland was not prepared to settle the Corridor question in a reasonable way... I made one more final effort to accept a proposal for mediation... For two whole days I sat with my Government and waited to see whether it was convenient for the Polish Government to send a plenipotentiary or not... Deputies, if the German Government and its Leader patiently endured such treatment Germany would deserve only to disappear from the political stage. But I am wrongly judged if my love of peace and my patience are mistaken for weakness or even cowardice... These proposals for mediation have failed...

Hitler then spoke of the Molotov–Ribbentrop Pact, which had been signed just ten days before, on August 23. Although news of the pact had been published in the Soviet Union and had by then widely spread throughout the world, this speech included Hitler's first formal declaration of the Pact:

I am happy particularly to be able to tell you of one event... I no longer see any reason why [Germany and Russia] should still oppose one another... We have, therefore, resolved to conclude a pact which rules out for ever any use of violence between us... Russia and Germany fought against one another in the World War. That shall and will not happen a second time.

Hitler justified the German attack by claiming Polish culpability based on (invented) Polish atrocities at Pitschen and other places, including Gleiwitz and Hochlinden, both of these being part of the culmination of Operation Himmler, a false flag operation intended to demonstrate that the Poles had attacked first, the Gleiwitz incident being the most notable.

This night for the first time Polish regular soldiers fired on our territory. Since 5:45 a.m. we have been returning the fire, and from now on bombs will be met by bombs.

Hitler then declared himself as the "First soldier of the German Reich" (Erster Soldat des Deutschen Reiches), a self-claimed rank, effectively equivalent of Generalissimo. This was a further step in cementing Hitler's position as supreme commander of the German Armed Forces (Oberbefehlshaber der Deutschen Wehrmacht):

I am from now on just first soldier of the German Reich. I have once more put on that coat that was the most sacred and dear to me. I will not take it off again until victory is secured, or I will not survive the outcome.

== Reactions ==
William L. Shirer observed that "Only once that day did Hitler utter the truth. In the end, this once, he would prove as good as his word. But no German I met in Berlin that day noticed that what the Leader was saying quite bluntly was that he could not face, or take, defeat should it come".

First Lady of the United States Eleanor Roosevelt wrote, "At 5:00 o’clock this morning, our telephone rang, and it was the President in Washington to tell me the sad news that Germany had invaded Poland and that her planes were bombing Polish cities. He told me that Hitler was about to address the Reichstag, so we turned on the radio and listened until 6:00 o’clock... As I listened to Hitler's speech, this letter kept returning to my mind... how can you say that you do not intend to make war on women and children and then send planes to bomb cities?" (In the speech, Hitler promised "I will not wage war against women and children. I have ordered my air force to restrict itself to attacks on military objectives" (Ich will nicht den Kampf gegen Frauen und Kinder führen. Ich habe meiner Luftwaffe den Auftrag gegeben, sich auf militärische Objekte bei ihren Angriffen zu beschränken.))

The New York Times headline for its front-page report of the speech, after leading with quotes that "Bomb Will Be Met by Bomb" and Hitler's vow to "Fight Until Resolution" of the Polish situation, focused on the order of succession decree. In the speech, Hitler had declared that the order of his succession would be Hermann Göring, then Rudolf Hess, then a successor to be chosen by "the Senate" (den Senat) (although there was no Senate, the Reichsrat inherited from the Weimar Republic having been abolished on 14 February 1934.) This was the first announcement of this order of succession. (This designation of Göring as Hitler's successor remained in effect (re-affirmed by a decree of 29 June 1941) until the Göring telegram of 23 April 1945, in which Göring attempted to use it to justify seizing control of Germany.)
