= Rozalin, Wyszków County =

Rozalin
- Hamlet
- Location within Poland
- Coordinates: 52°34′01″N 21°35′14″E
- Country: Poland
- Voivodeship: Masovian
- County: Wyszków
- Municipality: Wyszków
- Time zone: UTC+1 (CET)
  - Summer (DST): UTC+2 (CEST)
- Postal code: 07-201
- Area code: +48 29
- Car plates: WWY

Rozalin (Polish: [rɔˈza.lin]) is a hamlet in the Masovian Voivodeship, Poland, located within the municipality of Wyszków in Wyszków County.
