= Albertów, Silesian Voivodeship =

Albertów
- Village
- Location within Poland
- Coordinates: 51°1′35″N 18°49′2″E
- Country: Poland
- Voivodeship: Silesian
- County: Kłobuck
- Gmina: Lipie
- Population: 369
- Time zone: UTC+1 (CET)
  - Summer (DST): UTC+2 (CEST)
- Vehicle registration: SKL

Albertów [alˈbɛrtuf] is a village in the administrative district of Gmina Lipie, within Kłobuck County, Silesian Voivodeship, in southern Poland.

During the German invasion of Poland, which started World War II, on September 3, 1939, the Germans carried out a massacre of 159 Poles in the village. The victims were inhabitants of Albertów and its surroundings (see Nazi crimes against the Polish nation).
