= Parzymiechy =

- Village
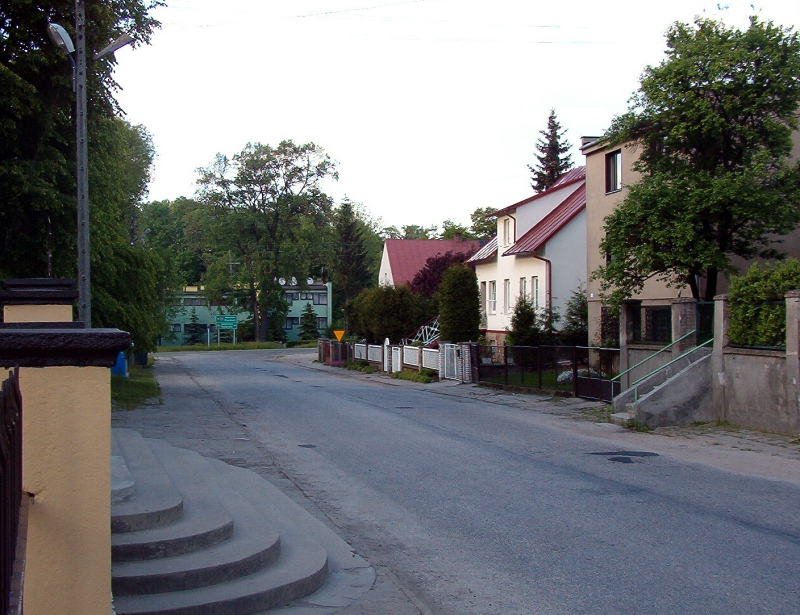
- Central part of the village

- Location within Poland
- Coordinates: 51°2′N 18°44′E
- Country: Poland
- Voivodeship: Silesian
- County: Kłobuck
- Gmina: Lipie
- Highest elevation: 256.8 m (843 ft)
- Lowest elevation: 219.0 m (718.5 ft)

Population
  - Total: 715
- Time zone: UTC+1 (CET)
  - Summer (DST): UTC+2 (CEST)
- Vehicle registration: SKL

Parzymiechy [paʐɨˈmjɛxɨ] is a village in the administrative district of Gmina Lipie, within Kłobuck County, Silesian Voivodeship, in southern Poland.

== History ==
Parzymiechy was first mentioned in 1266. It was a private village of Polish nobility, administratively located in the Wieluń County in the Sieradz Voivodeship in the Greater Poland Province of the Kingdom of Poland.

In September 1939, during the German invasion of Poland, which started World War II, a battle was fought nearby. German troops burned the village on September 2, 1939, and murdered 75 Polish inhabitants, including 20 children (the Zimnowoda and Parzymiechy massacre, see also Nazi crimes against the Polish nation).

== Transport ==
Main road connections from the Parzymiechy include connection with Praszka (to the west) and Działoszyn (to the north-east) via the National Road DK 42.

== Gallery ==
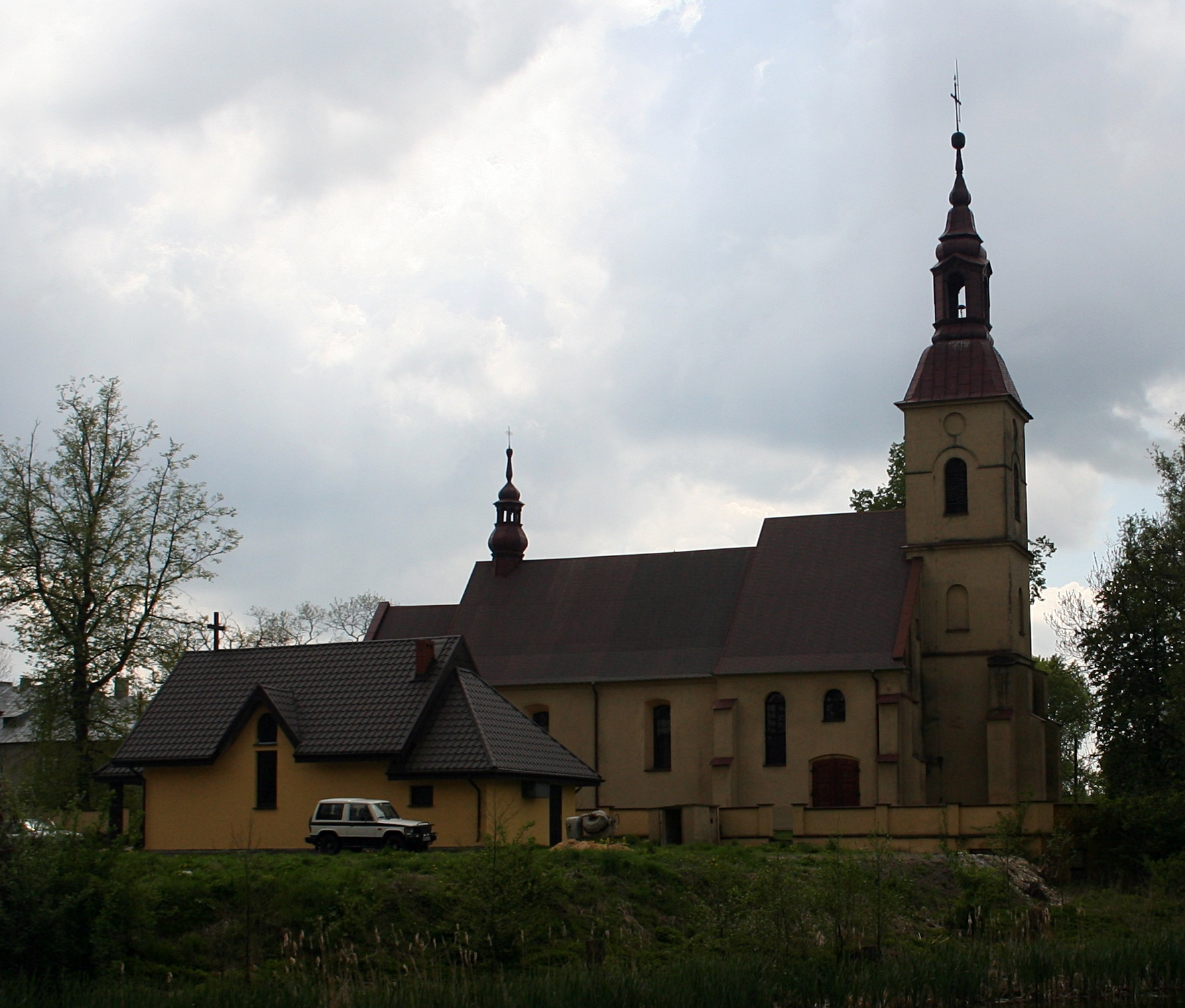
Saints Peter and Paul church

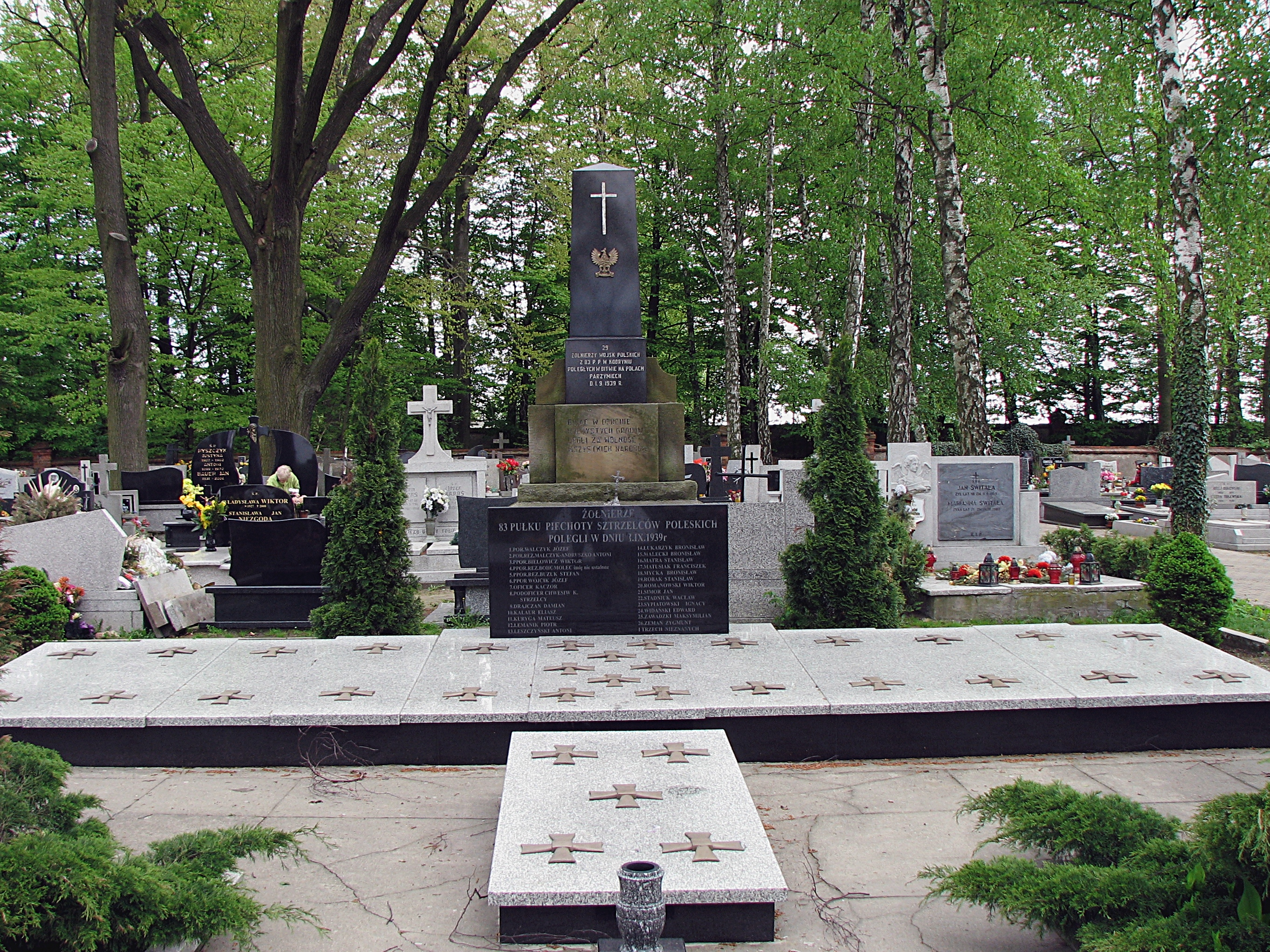
Grave of Polish soldiers fallen during the German invasion of Poland

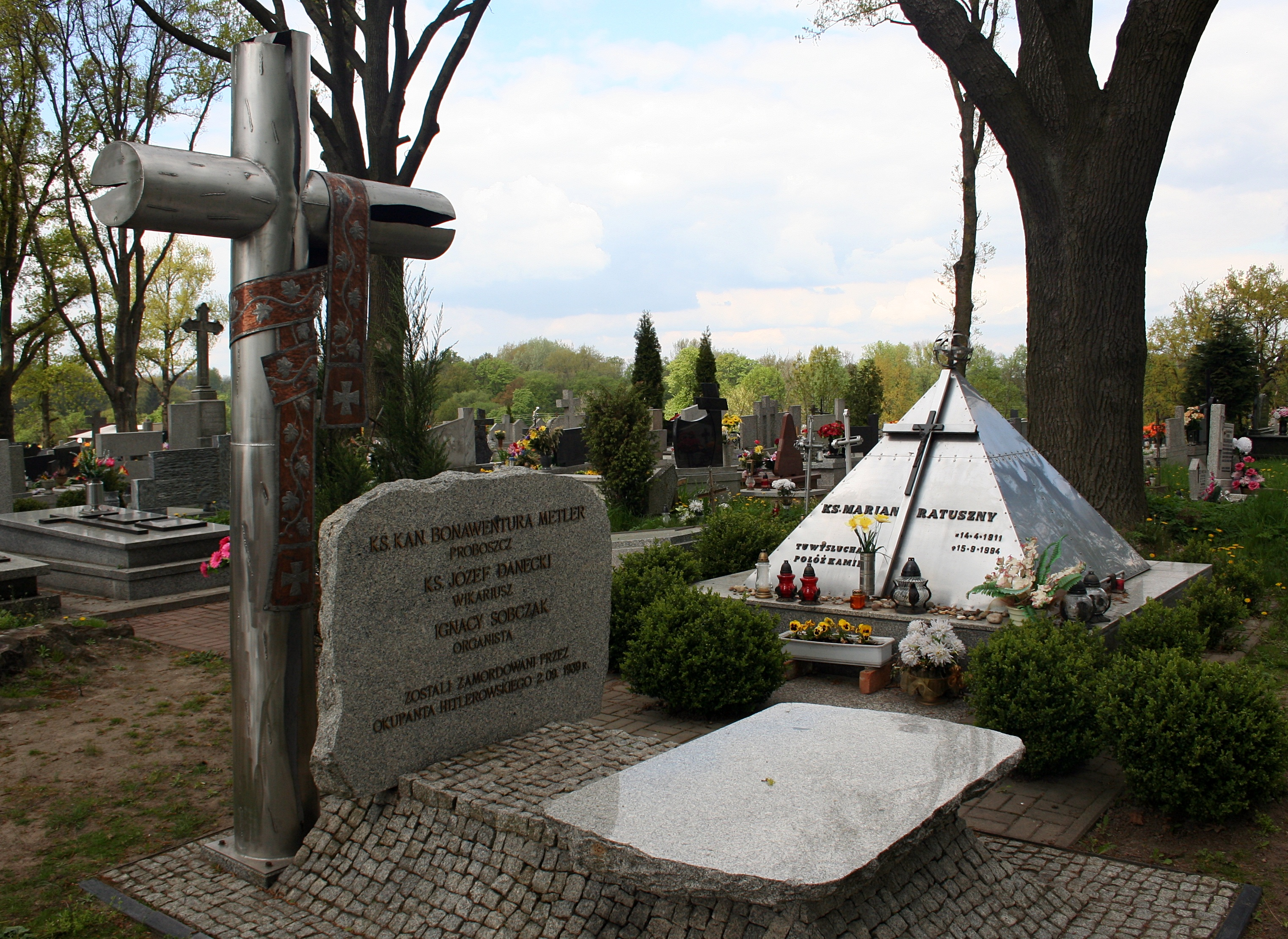
Grave of Polish priests and organist, murdered by the Germans during World War II
