= Operation Himmler =

1939 false-flag operations by Germany against Poland

Coordinates: 50.3167°N 18.6833°E

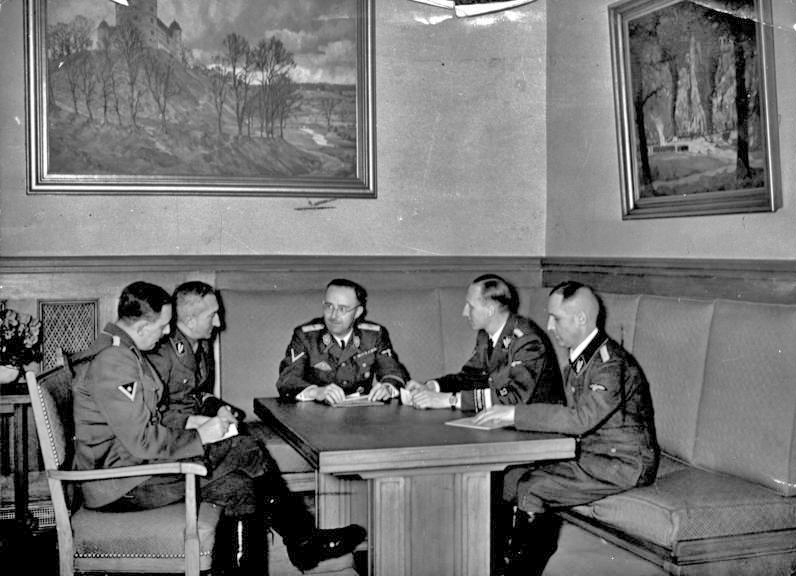
Left to right: Franz Josef Huber, Arthur Nebe, and the three planners of most of Operation Himmler: Heinrich Himmler, Reinhard Heydrich, and Heinrich Müller

Operation Himmler, also called Operation Konserve, consisted of a group of 1939 false flag operations planned by Nazi Germany to give the appearance of Polish aggression against Germany. The Germans then used propaganda reports of the events to justify their invasion of Poland, which started on 1 September 1939. Operation Himmler included the Germans staging false attacks on themselves—directed at innocent people, such as civilians and concentration camp prisoners. The operation arguably became the first act of the Second World War in Europe.

== Planning ==
Prior to the 1939 invasion, German newspapers and politicians like Adolf Hitler carried out a national and international propaganda campaign accusing Polish authorities of organizing or tolerating violent ethnic cleansing of ethnic Germans living in Poland.

The plan, named after its originator, Heinrich Himmler, was supervised by Reinhard Heydrich and managed by Heinrich Müller. The goal of this false flag project was to create the appearance of Polish aggression against Germany, which could be used to justify the German invasion of Poland. Hitler also might have hoped to confuse Poland's allies, the United Kingdom and France, into delaying or stopping their declaration of war on Germany.

== Implementation ==
The operations were mostly carried out on 31 August. The operation, as well as the main German offensive, was originally scheduled for 26 August; the shifting diplomatic situation resulted in delay until 31 August and 1 September. The operations were carried out by agents of the SS and the SD. The German troops, dressed in Polish uniforms, would storm various border buildings, scare the locals with inaccurate shots, carry out acts of vandalism, retreat and leave behind dead bodies in Polish uniforms. The bodies were really prisoners from concentration camps who were dressed in Polish uniforms, killed by lethal injection, shot for appearances and left behind. They were described in plans as Konserve: canned goods, which also led to the informal name of the operation, Operation Konserve.

There were several separate operations, including staged attacks on the following:

- The strategic railway at Jablunka Pass (Jabłonków Incident), on the border between Poland and Czechoslovakia
- The German radio station Sender Gleiwitz (Gliwice), the Gleiwitz incident being arguably the most notable of the Operation Himmler operations
- The German customs station at Hochlinden (now part of Rybnik-Stodoły)
- The forest service station in Pitschen, now Byczyna
- The communications station at Neubersteich, which was Nieborowitzer Hammer before 12 February 1936 and is now Kuznia Nieborowska
- The railway station in Alt-Eiche (Smolniki), Rosenberg in Westpreußen District
- A woman and her companion in Katowice

=== Gleiwitz incident ===
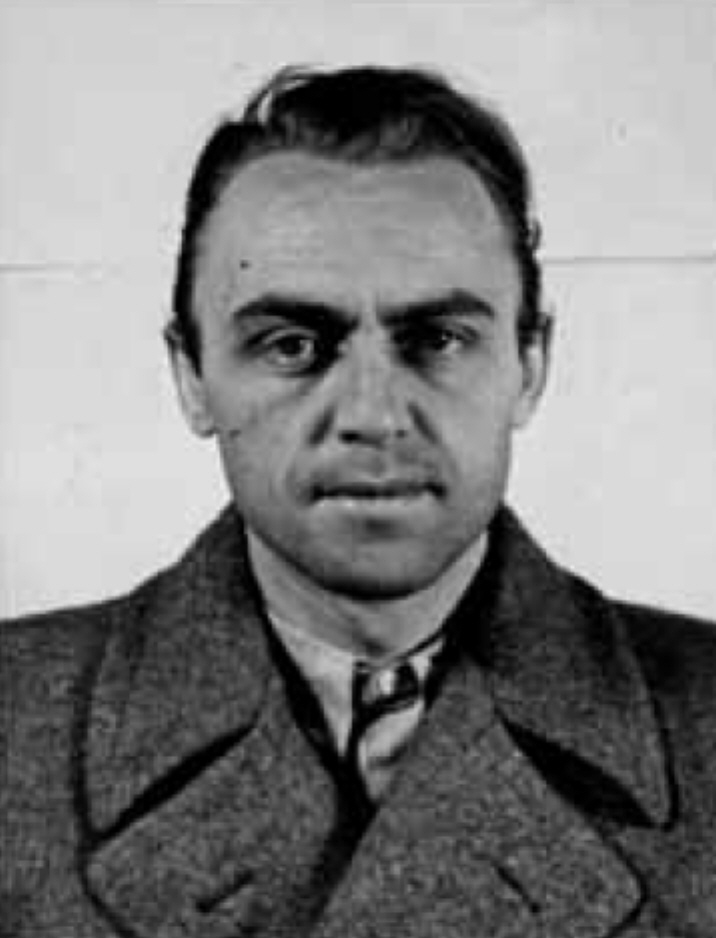
Alfred Naujocks

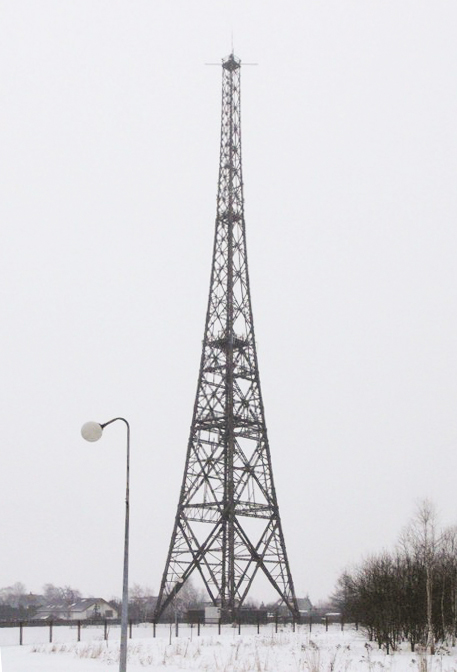
Gliwice Radio Tower today. It is the highest wooden structure in Europe.

On the night of 31 August a small group of German operatives, dressed in Polish uniforms and led by Alfred Naujocks, seized the Gleiwitz radio station and broadcast a short anti-German message in Polish (sources vary on the content of the message). Several prisoners (most likely from the Dachau concentration camp) and a local Polish-Silesian activist (arrested a day earlier) were left dead on the scene in Polish uniforms.

== Aftermath ==
In his 1 September speech to the Reichstag announcing war, Hitler cited the 21 border incidents as justification for Germany's "defensive" action against Poland:

I can no longer find any willingness on the part of the Polish Government to conduct serious negotiations with us. These proposals for mediation have failed because in the meanwhile there, first of all, came as an answer to the sudden Polish general mobilization, followed by more Polish atrocities. These were again repeated last night. Recently in one night, there were as many as twenty-one frontier incidents: last night there were fourteen, of which three were quite serious. I have, therefore, resolved to speak to Poland in the same language that Poland for months past has used toward us... This night for the first time Polish regular soldiers fired on our own territory. Since 5:45 a. m., we have been returning the fire... I will continue this struggle, no matter against whom, until the safety of the Reich and its rights are secured

By mid-1939, thousands of Polish Volksdeutsche had been secretly prepared for sabotage and guerrilla warfare by the Breslau (Wrocław) office of the Abwehr. Their activities were meant to provoke anti-German reprisals that could be claimed as provocations.

The German agents indeed co-operated with the German forces during the invasion of Poland, which led to some reprisals that were highly exaggerated by the German propaganda. One of the most notable cases of such a scenario was reportedly carried out during Bydgoszcz Bloody Sunday. An instruction issued by the Ministry of Propaganda stated that the press

must show news on the barbarism of Poles in Bromberg. The expression "bloody sunday" must enter as a permanent term in the dictionary and circumnavigate the globe. For that reason, this term must be continuously underlined.

The operation convinced very little international opinion about the German claims.

== See also ==
- Mukden incident
- Operation Tannenberg
- Shelling of Mainila
- Operation Northwoods
- Gulf of Tonkin incident
