= Battle of Częstochowa (1939) =

World War II battle in Poland

- Part of World War II
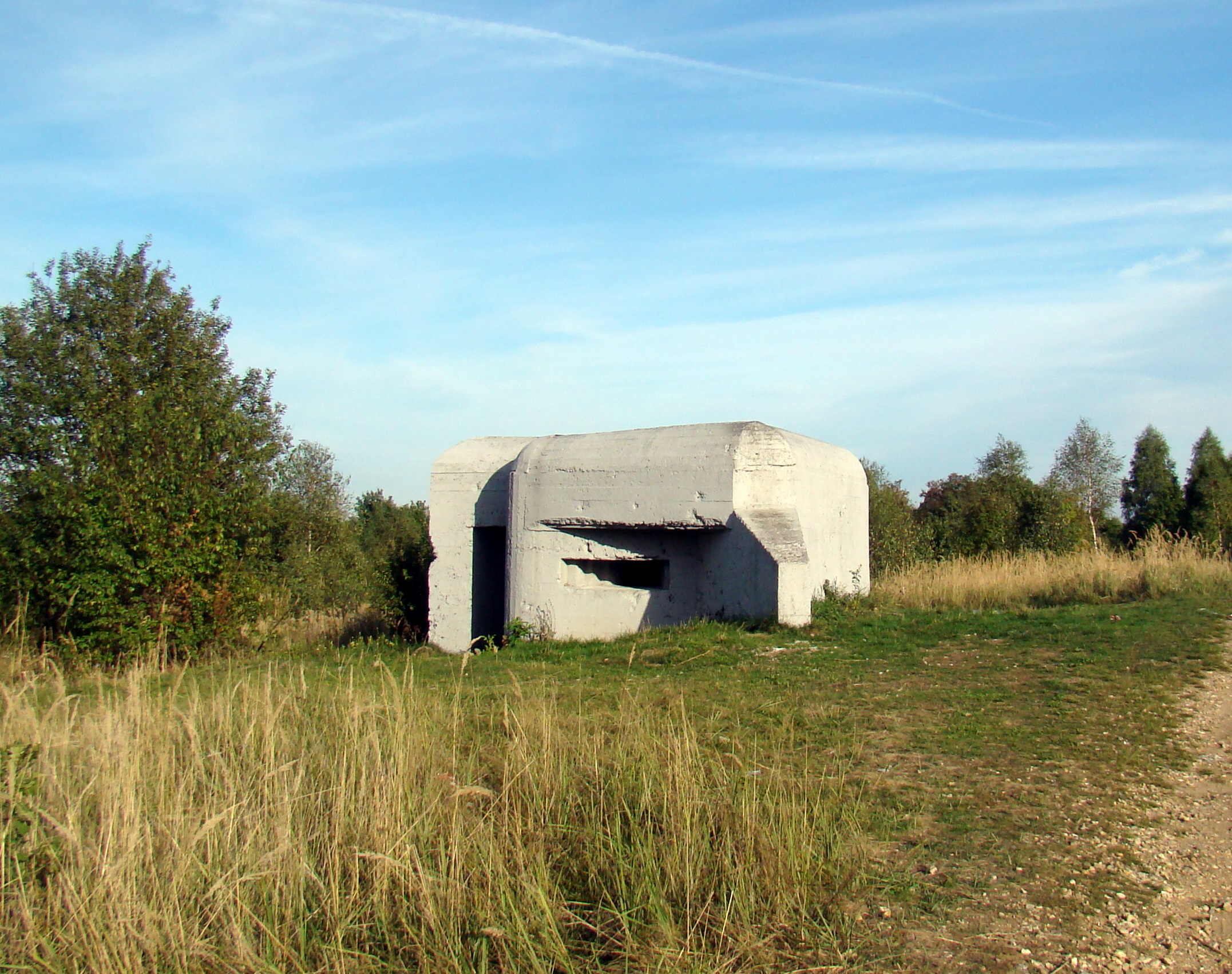
- Polish combat bunker 10, built in 1939 as part of the Częstochowa redoubt (consisting of 19 bunkers, 12 are known).
Date	September 1 – 3, 1939
Location	Częstochowa, Kielce Voivodeship, Poland 50°49′2″N 19°8′18″E
Result	German victory

Belligerents
Germany	Poland

Commanders and leaders
Erich Höpner; Viktor von Schwedler	Janusz Gąsiorowski

Units involved
1st Panzer Division; 4th Panzer Division; 4th Infantry Division; 14th Infantry Division; 31st Infantry Division; 46th Infantry Division	7th Infantry Division

The Battle of Częstochowa was one of the first battles of the Invasion of Poland during World War II. It took place on September 1–3, 1939.

== Preparations ==
The Polish army tasked the 7th Infantry Division to defend Częstochowa. The region started defensive preparations in March 1939 with the planning of a fortified defensive line with concrete bunkers and earthworks (trenches, etc), barbed wire and other defenses. By the time of the invasion, the Częstochowa region had 19 reinforced concrete combat and observation bunkers, plus 4 in Lubliniec as well as wooden and earth bunkers and mine fields, barriers, barbed wire, anti-tank ditches, trenches, artillery, anti-tank guns (Pistolet przeciwpancernymi Wz 36/bofors 37mm) and machine guns (Ckm wz. 30) and a telephone network. Bridges and viaducts were constructed throughout the region. By August 29, the 7th Infantry Division had occupied the fortified defenses.

== The battle ==
=== September 1st ===
On September 1, the Częstochowa region was assaulted by the 1st Panzer Division, 4th Panzer Division, 4th Infantry Division, 14th Infantry Division, 31st Infantry Division and 46th Infantry Division. Advance units in front of the main Częstochową defenses were isolated from each other and battled with the German attackers throughout the day, after which the Polish defenders retired to the main Częstochową defenses behind them. That evening at Gnaszyn position, in the main defenses near Częstochową, an ambush was conducted by soldiers of the 25th infantry regiment who launched a surprise attack on a staff car alongside a motorcycle. This ambush yielded maps and a captured Oberstleutnant (lieutenant colonel or commissioned officer) who was sent to a field hospital. Maps and the vehicle captured in the ambush were sent to divisional HQ. After the German Army advanced on Gnaszyn, the German soldiers brutally repressed the Polish soldiers in revenge for the ambush.

=== September 2nd ===
On September 2, the Germans launched an intense but ineffective artillery barrage from the South. On September 2, the 7th anti-aircraft artillery battery shot down 6 German planes and damaged several more. The Poles lost one aircraft and its crew (PZL.23 Karaś), during an air raid on a German column on the Truskolasy-Węczyca Wielka road. One plane from the 64th bomber squadron was lost, but the pilot managed to bring the plane back to Polish lines. The next day further aircraft losses occurred when a PZL.23 Karaś aircraft from 22nd bomber squadron was shot down by a German fighter, which crashed in Gnaszyn.

Around noon, German units launched an attack on the Lisiniec area from the Szarlejka area. The advance units then retreated to the main defenses where the German attack was halted. The Germans lost five tanks in the attack. Meanwhile in the area of Czarny Las, a sharpshooter destroyed three armored cars (most likely with a Wz. 35 anti-tank rifle), in which Polish forces found maps and other intelligence. In the late afternoon, a massive attack by German tanks and infantry was carried out on the defensive positions near Kiedrzyn, Lisiniec, Błeszne and Wrzosowa. The fight in Kiedrzyn between the 27th Infantry Regiment and the 1st Panzer Division lasted from 5:30 pm to 7:30 pm. In total, the Poles, defending themselves in shelters and artillery positions, destroyed over 40 German tanks and armored cars. In the area of Błeszno and Wrzosowa, some units of the 74th infantry regiment were forced back but after a counterattack, they retook their original positions from the Germans who suffered many casualties. The 74th infantry regiment took 30 prisoners and a few machine guns.

Subsequent attacks by German forces were successfully repelled by Polish forces until the evening. The strong Polish resistance in Częstochową forced the Germans to encircle the city and the Polish division defending it. In response to the threat of encirclement, the staff of the 7th Division on the night of September 2 withdrew the division from the city to the village of Janów before the encirclement was completed. The last units left the city in the early morning of September 3, blowing up bridges on the Warta River as they left.

=== September 3rd and 4th ===
The 7th Infantry Division was defeated on September 3–4 by German forces during its retreat to Janów and Złoty Potok. Its commander General Janusz Gąsiorowski, was taken prisoner and staff documents, including the codes of the Polish Army, fell into German hands.

== Summary ==
In the fights for Częstochowa, the Germans lost over 60 tanks and armored cars, 6 airplanes, several dozen cars and tractors, and a few guns. Equipment was also acquired by Polish forces. German casualties amounted to over 250 killed, wounded and captured, while Polish losses are difficult to estimate, but smaller.

== Aftermath ==
After the retreat of the 7th Infantry Division from Częstochowa, the Częstochowa massacre was committed by the occupying Wehrmacht forces.

== Remnants from the battle ==
Ten combat bunkers and two observation shelters survive in the city; most bearing hits from anti-tank guns, tank guns or artillery. None of the bunkers were destroyed or seriously damaged during the fighting.

== Commemoration ==
Since 2011, the 7th Infantry Division bicycle rally has been organized along the green tourist trail of the same name.

== See also ==
- The Polish Wikipedia article that served as the inspiration for this article
- List of World War II military equipment of Poland
- List of German military equipment of World War II

== Bibliography ==
- Adam Kurus: Częstochowa 1939: Zapomniana bitwa (pol.). Do broni. Portal historii ożywionej, 2012-05-17. [dostęp 2012-05-24].
- Adam Kurus: Częstochowa 1939: Zapomniana bitwa (pol.). Urząd Miasta Częstochowy, maj 2012. s. 18. [dostęp 2015-06-13]. [zarchiwizowane z tego adresu (2015-06-13)].
