= Wrocław Walking Pilgrimage =

Polish annual walking pilgrimage

Wrocław Walking Pilgrimage is an annual walking pilgrimage to Jasna Góra from Wrocław held in August. It leaves Wrocław on August 2 and after nine days of walking approximately 230 kilometers enters Częstochowa.

== History ==
Wrocław's Archbishop Cardinal Henryk Gulbinowicz decided to create the Wrocław Walking Pilgrimage to Jasna Góra in 1981. Before this occurred, groups of pilgrims from Wrocław had already been walking to Jasna Góra since 1956. Between 1977 and 1980 many inhabitants of Wrocław participated in the Warsaw Pilgrimage to Jasna Góra. The Rev. Stanisław Orzechowski, who was responsible for pastoral ministry to university students of the Wawrzyny community, and the Rev. Andrzej Dziełak, minister of the CODA student ministry group, were formally invited to organize this "walking retreat" for the faithful of the Archdiocese of Wrocław. They organized the first "pilgrimage bureaus", which gathered people and necessary equipment as well as disseminated relevant information to parishes.

The first pilgrimages experienced huge difficulties because of a lack of experience as well as new laws and surveillance by the Communist government's intelligence agency, the Służba Bezpieczeństwa.

The first Wrocław Walking Pilgrimage modeled itself with regards to organizational issues after the Warsaw Walking Pilgrimage. Gradually, however, the Wrocław Walking Pilgrimage worked out its own style and organization, which allowed it greater independence.

== Pilgrimage Structure ==
Each year, the pilgrimage begins on August 2. However, in 2010 the pilgrimage will begin on August 1 because of the 30th anniversary of the pilgrimage. Pilgrims sleep in tents. Only the sick and elderly are allowed to sleep indoors.

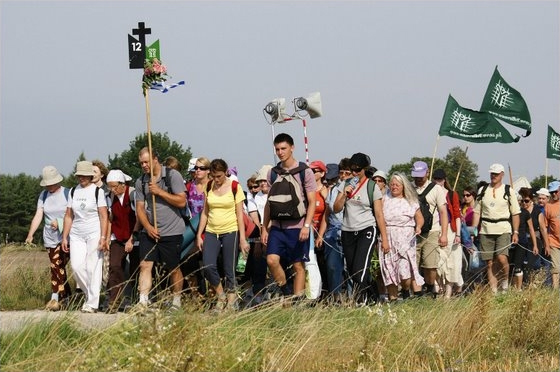
Pielgrzymka Wrocławska 2008, fot. Kamil Szyszka

The pilgrims primarily travel across villages, forests, and rural roads. The pilgrimage covers approximately 230 km. It is divided into nine phases. The 30th anniversary pilgrimage will be one phase longer. Below is a summary of the pilgrimage route:

1. 1.08.2010 Wrocław – Trzebnica
2. 2.08.2010 Trzebnica - Oleśnica
3. 3.08.2010 Oleśnica - Wilków
4. 4.08.2010 Wilków - Włochy
5. 5.08.2010 Włochy - Kluczbork
6. 6.08.2010 Kluczbork - Borki Małe
7. 7.08.2010 Borki Małe – Borki Wielkie
8. 8.08.2010 Borki Wielkie - Puszczew / Węglowice
9. 9.08.2010 Puszczew / Węglowice - Częstochowa Zacisze
10. 10.08.2010 Częstochowa Zacisze - Jasna Góra

The epilogue of the pilgrimage is an annual one-day autumn pilgrimage to Trzebnica to the Sanctuary of St. Hedwig of Andechs, the patron saint of Lower Silesia. The autumn pilgrimage also celebrates the election of John Paul II to the Papacy on October 16, 1978.
