= Battle of Częstochowa =

Battle of Częstochowa may refer to:

- Siege of Jasna Góra (1655)
- Battle of Częstochowa (1939)
