= Częstochowa massacre =

Massacre of Polish civilians in 1939

Częstochowa massacre of 1939
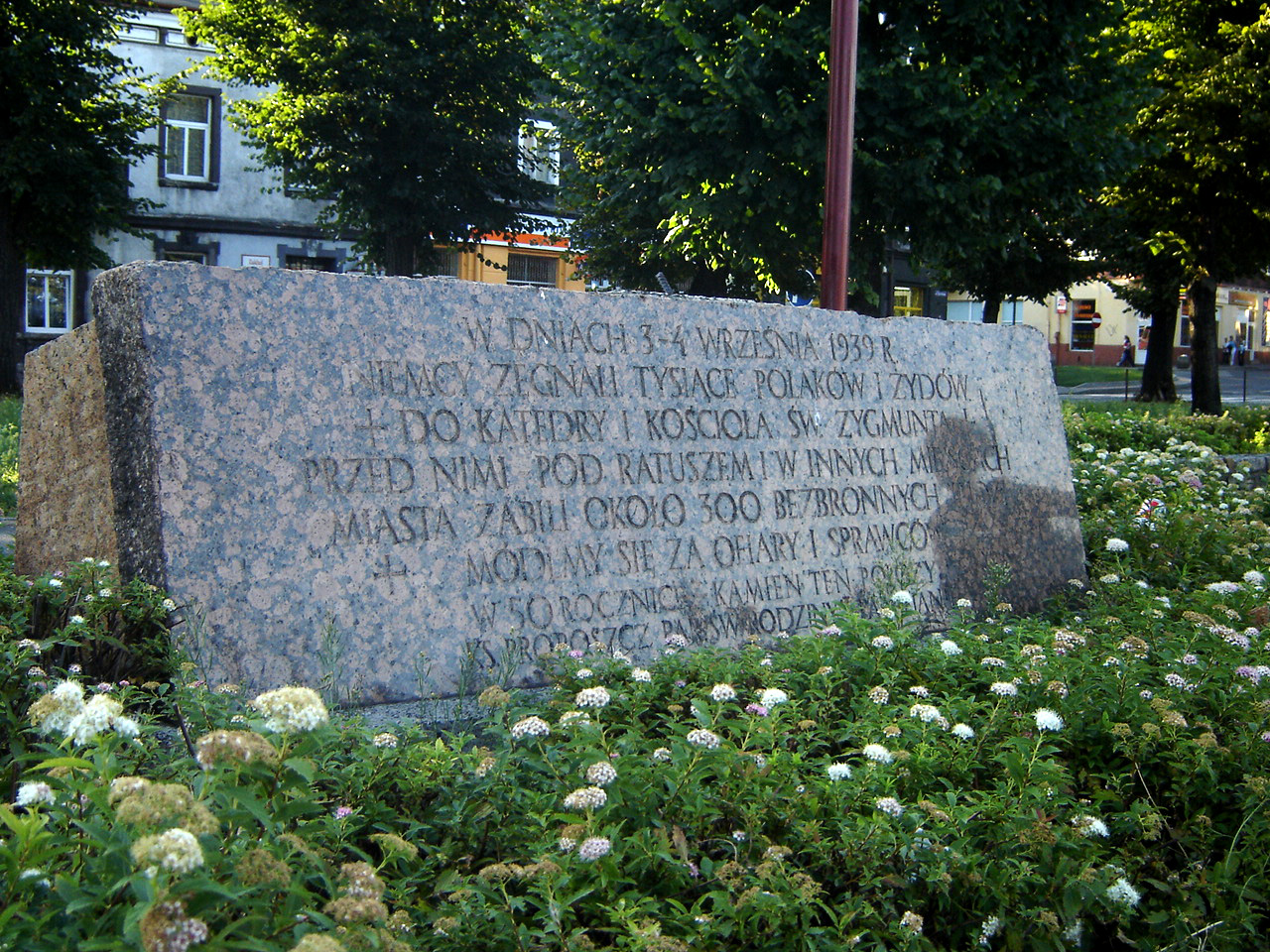
- A monument commemorating the massacre, on the John Paul II square, near the cathedral where atrocities took place
- Location: 50°48′N 19°07′E; Częstochowa, occupied Poland
- Date: 4–6 September 1939
- Target: Poles, Polish Jews
- Attack type: Shooting and stabbing
- Weapons: Rifles and automatic weapons
- Deaths: 990 Poles and 150 Jews (est.)
- Perpetrator: Wehrmacht
- Motive: Anti-Polish sentiment, antisemitism, Germanisation, pan-Germanism

The Częstochowa massacre, also known as the Bloody Monday, was committed by the German Wehrmacht forces beginning on the 4th day of World War II in the Polish city of Częstochowa, between 4 and 6 September 1939. The shootings, beatings and plunder continued for three days in more than a dozen separate locations around the city. Approximately 1,140 Polish civilians (150 of whom were ethnically Jewish), were murdered.

== Background ==
The city of Częstochowa (population 117,000 in 1931) was overrun by the German Army on 3 September 1939 without a fight, during the German invasion of Poland, as the Polish Army "Kraków" units of the 7th Infantry Division, stationing there, had withdrawn the previous day. Many able-bodied men left the city along with the Polish soldiers. The 42 Infantry Regiment "Bayreuth" of the Wehrmacht's 10th Army entered the city early in the afternoon. On that day, their guns were not loaded, as the Wehrmacht command was more concerned with the risk of "friendly fire" caused by inexperience and nervousness on the part of the troops, than of possible threat from the Polish rear guard. Notably, the German wild shootings caused by fear had broken out elsewhere, often leading to massacres of civilians as in Kajetanowice.

Archived diaries of the German soldiers, as well as the official army reports, reveal that the remaining civilian population of the city acted peacefully and did not obstruct the German army in any way. The evening of 3 September passed without any incidents. Searches of houses and business premises turned up no concealed weapons.

== Massacre ==
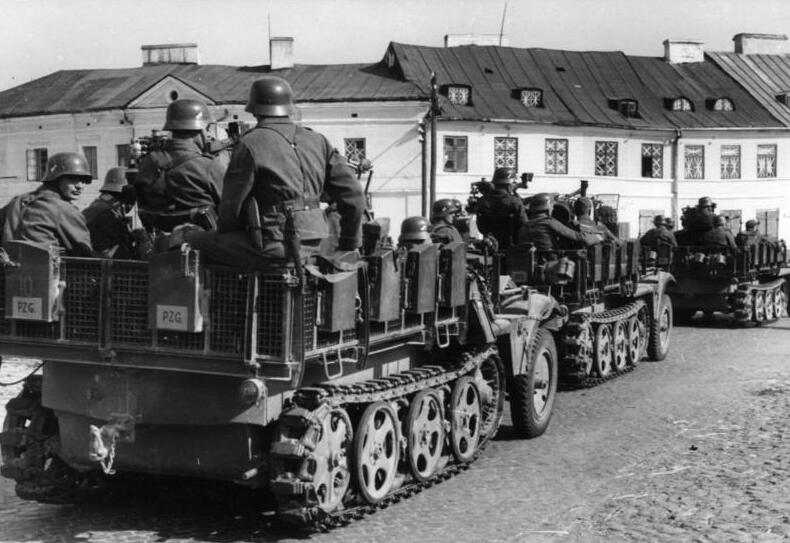
The Wehrmacht entering the suburbs of Czestochowa

The Regimental headquarters, located 20 km south of the city, received a report on the evening of 4 September from the German units of the 42nd Regiment (46th Infantry Division (Wehrmacht)), alleging that they had been attacked by "Polish partisans" in two different incidents; one in the courtyard of the Technical School where the regiment stationed, and one involving a prisoner column guarded by the 97th Regiment. The German soldiers claimed to have been shot at from one of the houses near where they were.

However, subsequent reports and testimonies of soldiers inform that none of the German witnesses were able to describe the supposed attackers. A search of houses that took place after the massacre failed to turn up any "suspicious persons". According to German historian Jochen Böhler, the shootings were perpetrated by panicking and nervous (most likely under the influence of stimulants) German soldiers who then used the imagined or invented "Polish partisans" as an excuse for their rash actions and the massacre that followed. According to a Polish eyewitness of the event, who had been arrested and became part of a column of Polish captives under the German guard, Wehrmacht soldiers fired from a machine gun on the prisoners' column which caused panic among those trying to escape death. Resulting from this, the guards escorting the column began shooting wildly at them. In the shooting, about 200 Polish and Jewish individuals were murdered.

The second part of the massacre took place in a different part of the city after the first wild shootings had stopped. According to the testimony of Helena Szpilman before the Jewish Historical Committee, German soldiers rounded up Polish and Jewish civilians from their homes and forced them to march to the Magnacki Square, in front of the town's cathedral. There they were all forced to lie face down on the ground and told that anyone who moved would be shot. In all there were several thousand individuals including the elderly, children and women. Lt. Col. Ube, who was in charge of the Wehrmacht units carrying out the massacre (and who was the author of the report to regimental command who blamed the shooting on "Polish partisans") estimated that around 10,000 people had been collected in the square. Similar estimates of the number of people rounded up are given by eyewitnesses and survivors.

After separating the men from the women, the men were searched and any found with a shaving razor or a pocket knife were shot on the spot. The remaining men were told to enter the church, but as they began moving to do so German soldiers opened fire on them from machine guns and hand-held weapons. According to the testimony of Henoch Diamant, who was wounded in the shooting, several hundred people were killed on the spot and about 400 were wounded as a result. The unfolding of the massacre in front of the cathedral was captured in narrative form by a German photographer, from the initial round-up to the Poles and Jews awaiting their fate, to photos of corpses strewn across the city's streets and the cathedral square. This collection of photos was acquired by an American soldier from a captured German machine gunner near the end of the war.

=== Death count ===
According to the official report written by Lt. Col. Ube: in course of the "punishment action for partisan activity" 3 women and 96 men had been killed. However, in the spring of 1940, the German mayor of Czestochowa, Richard Wendler, gave permission for the exhumation of the bodies by the town council. Some 227 corpses were unearthed, including 194 men, 25 women, and 8 children; 22 victims were identified as Jewish. The bodies were exhumed in several locations including at Krakowska Street (54), at Garncarska (40), by the city hall (48), and at Piotrkowska Street (4). There were also several smaller scale murders carried out at various points in the city, including of patients at a military hospital which was run by the Red Cross.

According to the Center for Documentation of Częstochowa History, at least 600 people were killed in the city overall on that day. Some estimates of victims put the number at more than 1,000; 990 ethnic Poles and 110 Jews (more than 40,000 Jews were later murdered after the liquidation of the Częstochowa Ghetto).

== Similar incidents ==
One of the regiments that carried out the massacres in Częstochowa was two days later involved in a very similar incident in the Polish village of Kajetanowice, although on a smaller scale. Once again, unknown shots were fired at the regiment (again most likely due to friendly fire) which caused nervous soldiers to begin shooting wildly. "They blindly shot up the houses", according to eyewitnesses, and then ordered all men of the village to gather in an open field. There, those that complied with the order were executed. In all 72 victims of the Kajetanowice massacre were identified (one-third of the village's inhabitants), including an infant, five little children, fourteen teenagers, twelve women and six elderly persons. One of the soldiers involved in the action told eyewitness Wiktoria Czech that he knew the villagers were innocent but that the regiment had received orders to kill all civilians. Another soldier commented that "Poles should be murdered when they're still in the crib". Subsequently, the entire village was burned to the ground.

The "losses" of the German units of the 42nd regiment in Kajetanowice consisted of two dead horses, both most likely shot by friendly fire. The official report of the unit stated that the massacre and burning of the village was carried out as revenge for the shooting of two German horses.

== Postwar investigations ==
An investigation of the massacre was carried out in Bayreuth, Germany, in 1985, regarding former soldiers of the 42nd Infantry Regiment. Most of them still claimed to have been shot at from nearby houses prior to the massacre but none could describe the supposed attackers. One former soldier even admitted that he had no idea if the supposed attackers were "soldiers, partisans or civilians". Several former soldiers admitted that a general panic had broken out among German troops, with everyone running to get their weapons, stumbling over each other and shooting wildly. One of the officers of the regiment recalled that he had been furious at his soldiers for their complete lack of discipline.

Former soldiers of the unit also admitted that in the search that followed they did not find any weapons, or for that matter, able-bodied men, only a few women with children and some elderly persons. Former soldier Hans M. stated "I never saw any partisans in Częstochowa with my own eyes".

In regard to the second massacre near the cathedral, former Wehrmacht soldier Fritz S. in an initial statement claimed that after the wild shooting stopped he was ordered to politely ask the civilians to leave their houses and gather in a church. However, Fritz S. voluntarily returned to the investigators several days later and changed his statement. He stated that the order was to forcible remove civilians from their homes and line them up face down on the ground. He added that "I want to emphasize that I never politely asked any civilians to leave their homes. In fact, we threw them out".

The massacre was also investigated by the Jewish Historical Committee and Czestochowa's government. In 2009, the Polish Institute of National Remembrance found mass graves near the Stradom railway station containing about 2000 corpses, although it is unclear at this stage if the bodies are related to this massacre or to later killings by the Nazis. Also in 2009, the diaries of Bolesław Kurkowski were discovered. Kurkowski witnessed the massacres and later took part in the 1940 exhumation of some of the bodies, as a forced laborer (the existence of the diaries had been known beforehand from several available fragments).

On the 70th anniversary of the German invasion of Poland, September 2009, the German public broadcaster Rundfunk Berlin-Brandenburg was planning to shoot a documentary film on the subject of the massacre in Częstochowa, since the war atrocities of the Wehrmacht were not widely known in Germany (in contrast to war atrocities of the SS and those committed after Hitler's invasion of the Soviet Union).

== See also ==
- List of massacres in Poland
- Massacre in Ciepielów
- War crimes of the Wehrmacht
- Battle of Częstochowa (1939)
