= Pogorzelski =

Pogorzelski is a surname. Notable people with the name include:

- Andrzej Pogorzelski (1938–2020), Polish motorcycle speedway rider and coach
- Eugeniusz Pogorzelski (1866–1934), Polish military officer
- Henry Pogorzelski (1922–2015), American mathematician of Polish descent
- Pawel Pogorzelski (born 1979), Polish-Canadian cinematographer
