= Grodzisko, Silesian Voivodeship =

Grodzisko
- Village
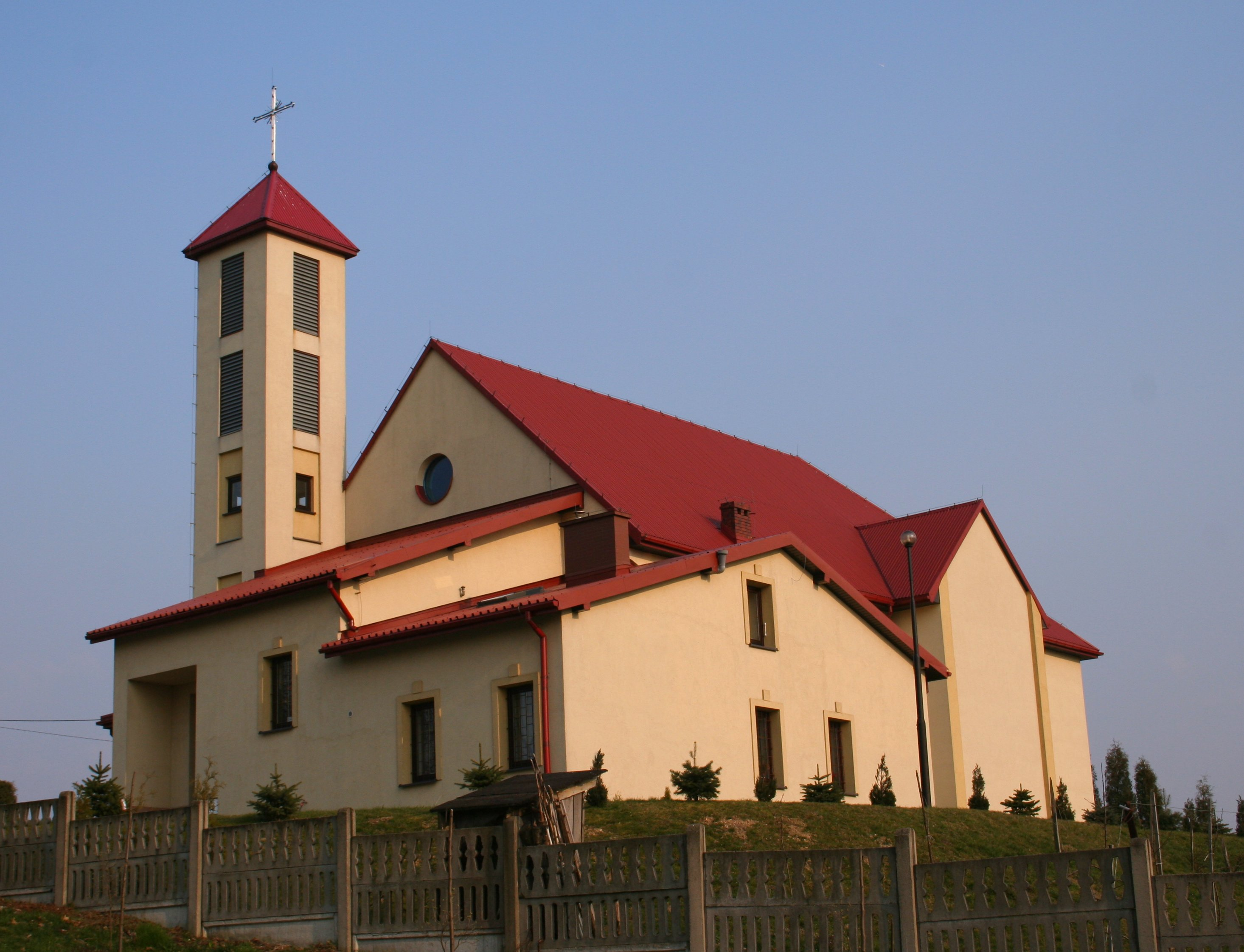
- Catholic church

- Location within Poland
- Coordinates: 50°51′54″N 18°57′8″E
- Country: Poland
- Voivodeship: Silesian
- County: Kłobuck
- Gmina: Wręczyca Wielka
- Population: 706

Grodzisko (Polish pronunciation: [ɡrɔˈd͡ʑiskɔ]) is a village in the administrative district of Gmina Wręczyca Wielka, within Kłobuck County, Silesian Voivodeship, in southern Poland. It is a settlement home to about 706 residents, historically and locally known for its Zamczysko Natural Reserve and public fishery located in the suburb of Podgrodzisko, on the border of local village Wręczyca Mała.
