= Gmina Wręczyca Wielka =

Gmina Wręczyca Wielka Wręczyca Wielka Commune
- Gmina
- Flag Coat of arms
- Interactive map of Gmina Wręczyca Wielka
- Coordinates (Wręczyca Wielka): 50°51′N 18°56′E
- Country: Poland
- Voivodeship: Silesian
- County: Kłobuck
- Seat: Wręczyca Wielka

Area
  - Total: 148.07 km^{2} (57.17 sq mi)

Population (2019-06-30)
  - Total: 17,760
  - Density: 119.9/km^{2} (310.7/sq mi)
- Website: https://www.wreczyca-wielka.pl/

Gmina Wręczyca Wielka is a rural gmina (administrative district) in Kłobuck County, Silesian Voivodeship, in southern Poland. Its seat is the village of Wręczyca Wielka, which lies approximately 8 kilometres (5 mi) south of Kłobuck and 67 km (42 mi) north of the regional capital Katowice.

The gmina covers an area of 148.07 square kilometres (57.2 sq mi), and as of 2019 its total population is 17,760.

The gmina contains part of the protected area called Upper Liswarta Forests Landscape Park.

== Villages ==
Gmina Wręczyca Wielka contains the villages and settlements of Bieżeń, Bór Zapilski, Borowe, Brzezinki, Czarna Wieś, Długi Kąt, Golce, Grodzisko, Hutka, Jezioro, Kalej, Klepaczka, Kuleje, Nowa Szarlejka, Nowiny, Pierzchno, Piła Druga, Piła Pierwsza, Puszczew, Szarlejka, Truskolasy, Węglowice, Wręczyca Mała, Wręczyca Wielka, Wydra and Zamłynie.

== Neighbouring gminas ==
Gmina Wręczyca Wielka is bordered by the city of Częstochowa and by the gminas of Blachownia, Herby, Kłobuck, Opatów, Panki and Przystajń.
