= Kalej =

- Village
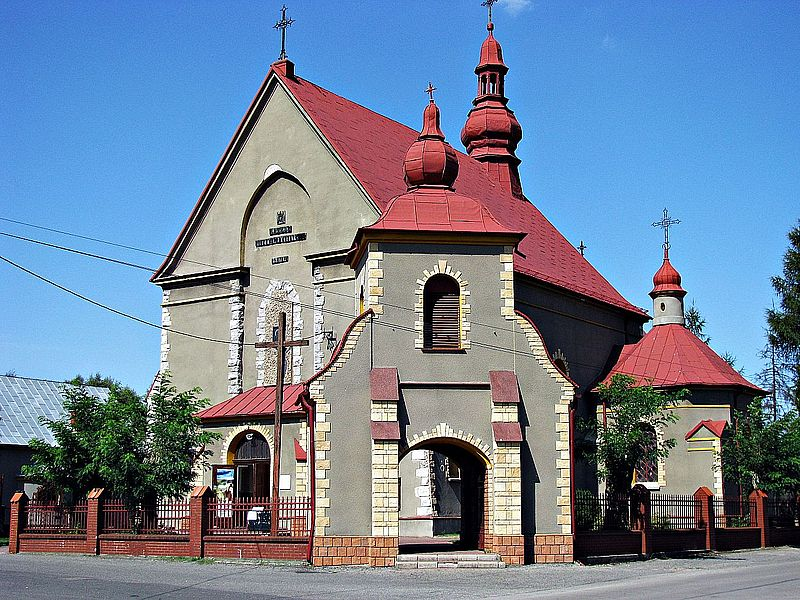
- Catholic church

- Location within Poland
- Coordinates: 50°50′13″N 18°58′54″E
- Country: Poland
- Voivodeship: Silesian
- County: Kłobuck
- Gmina: Wręczyca Wielka
- Population: 1,668

Kalej [ˈkalɛi̯] is a village in the administrative district of Gmina Wręczyca Wielka, within Kłobuck County, Silesian Voivodeship, in southern Poland.
