= Bieżeń =

- Village
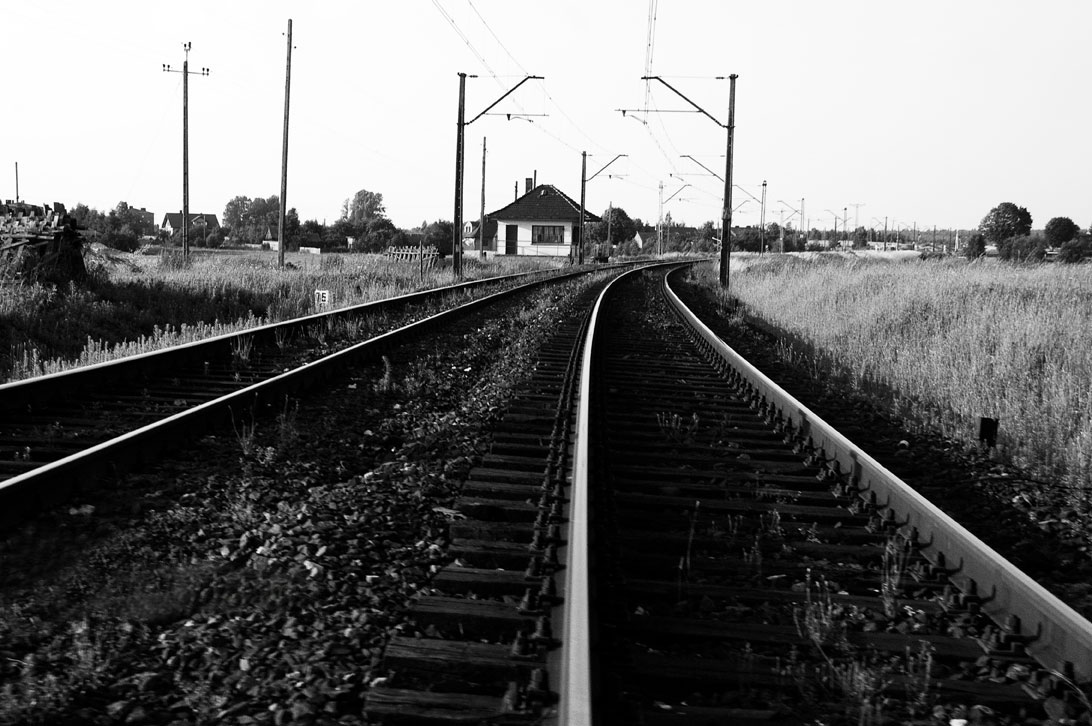
- Railway

- Location within Poland
- Coordinates: 50°48′N 18°53′E
- Country: Poland
- Voivodeship: Silesian
- County: Kłobuck
- Gmina: Wręczyca Wielka
- Population: 812

Bieżeń [ˈbjɛʐɛɲ] is a village in the administrative district of Gmina Wręczyca Wielka, within Kłobuck County, Silesian Voivodeship, in southern Poland.
