= Golce, Silesian Voivodeship =

Golce
- Village
- Location within Poland
- Coordinates: 50°51′59″N 18°52′5″E
- Country: Poland
- Voivodeship: Silesian
- County: Kłobuck
- Gmina: Wręczyca Wielka
- Elevation: 900 m (3,000 ft)
- Population: 386

Golce [ˈɡɔlt͡sɛ] is a village in the administrative district of Gmina Wręczyca Wielka, within Kłobuck County, Silesian Voivodeship, in southern Poland.
