= Pierzchno, Silesian Voivodeship =

Pierzchno
- Village
- Location within Poland
- Coordinates: 50°51′N 18°58′E
- Country: Poland
- Voivodeship: Silesian
- County: Kłobuck
- Gmina: Wręczyca Wielka
- Population: 286

Pierzchno [ˈpjɛʂxnɔ] is a village in the administrative district of Gmina Wręczyca Wielka, within Kłobuck County, Silesian Voivodeship, in southern Poland.
