= Janusz Gąsiorowski =

General Janusz Gąsiorowski
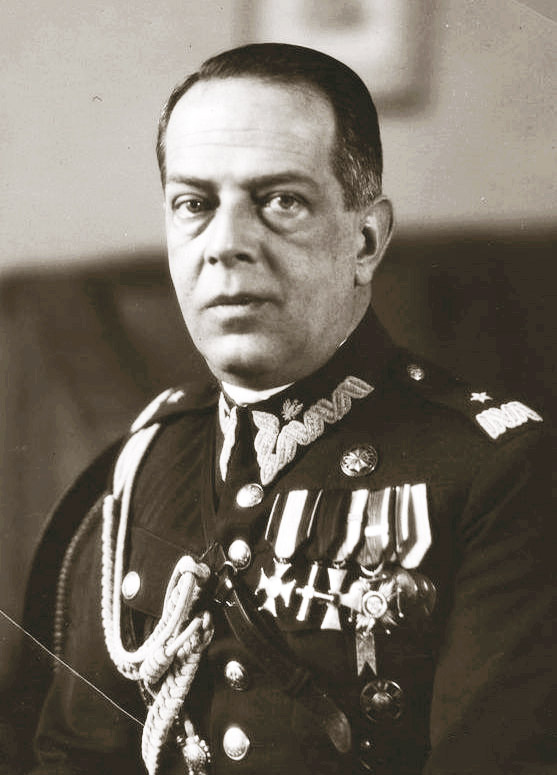
- Gąsiorowski in 1935

Chief of the General Staff
- In office 3 December 1931 – 7 June 1935
- Preceded by: Tadeusz Piskor
- Succeeded by: Wacław Stachiewicz

Personal details
- Born: 17 June 1889 Lemberg, Galicia and Lodomeria, Austria-Hungary (modern-day Lviv, Ukraine)
- Died: 19 October 1949 (aged 60) Paris, France
- Resting place: Cimetière des Champeaux de Montmorency
- Education: Jagiellonian University

Military service
- Allegiance: Second Polish Republic
- Branch/service: Polish Legions; Polish Armed Forces
- Years of service: 1912–1939
- Rank: Brigadier General
- Commands: 7th Infantry Division
- Battles/wars: First World War; Polish–Soviet War; Invasion of Poland

Janusz Gąsiorowski (1889 Lemberg – 1949 Paris) was a Polish general, commander of the Polish 7th Infantry Division during the German invasion of Poland in 1939. Taken prisoner on 4 September in the battle of Częstochowa. He was awarded the Serbian Order of Saint Sava and a number of other decorations.

He became the father-in-law of journalist Jerzy Turowicz, who married his daughter Anna, by his writer wife, Zofia Zawiszanka. Their greatgrandson is Pico Alexander, an American actor.

Janusz Gąsiorowski is buried in the Champeaux de Montmorency cemetery north of Paris.
