= Nowa Szarlejka =

Village in Silesian Voivodeship, Poland

- Village
- Location within Poland
- Coordinates: 50°50′3″N 19°1′24″E
- Country: Poland
- Voivodeship: Silesian
- County: Kłobuck
- Gmina: Wręczyca Wielka
- Population: 197

Nowa Szarlejka [ˈnɔva ʂarˈlɛi̯ka] is a village situated in the administrative district of Gmina Wręczyca Wielka, within Kłobuck County, Silesian Voivodeship, in southern Poland.
