= Wręczyca Wielka =

- Village
- Location within Poland
- Coordinates: 50°50′45″N 18°55′16″E
- Country: Poland
- Voivodeship: Silesian
- County: Kłobuck
- Gmina: Wręczyca Wielka
- Population: 2,718
- Website: http://www.wreczyca-wielka.pl/

Wręczyca Wielka [vrɛnˈt͡ʂɨt͡sa ˈvjɛlka] is a village in Kłobuck County, Silesian Voivodeship, in southern Poland. It is the seat of the gmina (administrative district) called Gmina Wręczyca Wielka.
