= Kuleje =

- Village
- Location within Poland
- Coordinates: 50°50′N 18°46′E
- Country: Poland
- Voivodeship: Silesian
- County: Kłobuck
- Gmina: Wręczyca Wielka
- Population: 661

Kuleje [kuˈlɛjɛ] is a village in the administrative district of Gmina Wręczyca Wielka, within Kłobuck County, Silesian Voivodeship, in southern Poland.
