= Eugeniusz Pogorzelski =

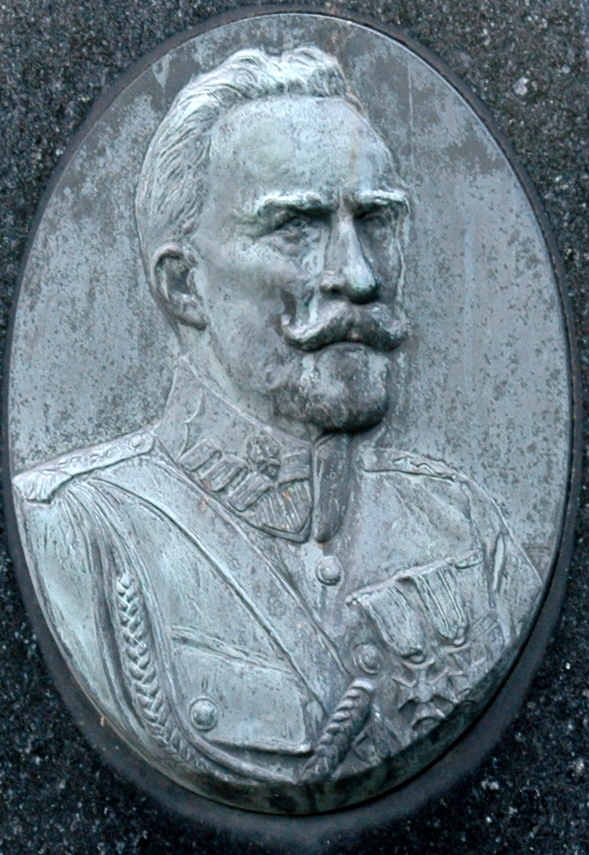

Eugeniusz Pogorzelski (December 30, 1866 – March 18, 1934) was a Polish military officer. Serving in the rank of Generał dywizji, he was the commanding officer of the Polish 7th Infantry Division during the Kiev offensive of the Polish-Bolshevik War.

== Sources ==
- Tadeusz Kryska-Karski, Stanisław Żurakowski, 1991: Generałowie Polski Niepodległej. Warszawa: Editions Spotkania
- Henryk P. Kosk, 2001: Generalicja polska. Vol. 2: M–Ż. Pruszków: Oficyna Wydawnicza "Ajaks". ISBN 83-87103-81-0
