= 7th Infantry Division (Poland) =

Soldiers of the 7th Division during Operation Tempest.

The 7th Infantry Division (Polish: 7. Dywizja Piechoty, 7 DP) was the name of several units of the Polish Army.

== Second Polish Republic ==
The original division was formed on 14 May 1919 near Częstochowa. At that time it consisted of two infantry brigades (13th and 14th), and four infantry regiments (25th, 26th, 11th and 27th), as well as two artillery brigades (7th Light Artillery, 7th Heavy Artillery). The division took part in shielding of the Polish borders during the Polish–Ukrainian War of 1919. During the Polish–Soviet War it was commanded by Col. Szubert and reinforced to three brigades (13th Bde under Herman, 14th Bde under Pogórzelski and 7th Artillery Bde under Luberadzki). It took part in the Battle of the Niemen as part of the Polish 3rd Army. After the war the division was dispersed in several barracks in western Poland, among them in Częstochowa, Piotrków Trybunalski, Lubliniec and Łódź. In 1921, the structure of the division was changed: both infantry brigades were dissolved, and the 11th Infantry Regiment was transferred to the 23rd Infantry Division. In the Second Polish Republic, the division was commanded by the Fourth Military District from Łódź. The headquarters of the division were stationed in Częstochowa, and it consisted of the following units:

- 25th Infantry Regiment (Piotrków Trybunalski),
- 27th Infantry Regiment (Częstochowa),
- 74th Upper Silesian Infantry Regiment (Lubliniec),
- 7th Light Artillery Regiment (Częstochowa).

In mid-1939, following Plan West, the 7th Division, commanded by General Janusz Gąsiorowski, was attached to Kraków Army, which defended southwestern corner of Poland. The division, supported by Battalion Kłobuck of the National Defense, defended 40-kilometer long section of the Polish–German border, between the towns of Lubliniec and Krzepice, north of which units of Łódź Army were stationed. Due to quick advance of the panzer units of the Wehrmacht, in the night of 1/2 September 1939, the division retreated from its positions near Kłobuck and Truskolasy, and manned main defence line around Częstochowa. During the retreat, a squadron of divisional cavalry was destroyed by the enemy. After bloody fighting near Częstochowa, the division was forced to retreat further east: on 2 September, General Gasiorowski received the order of General Antoni Szylling, commandant of Kraków Army, to begin the retreat in the evening. After a night march, the 7th Division reached the area of Lelów, where on 3 September in the morning its 74th Regiment was attacked by the 2nd Light Division. Polish losses were very high, while the enemy lost almost 50 tanks and other vehicles.

In the afternoon of 3 September, the division tried to break out of the encirclement. The advance, supported by divisional artillery, was at first successful, but after some time, German machine gun fire together with tanks halted the Poles. In the evening decimated units of the 7th Division tried once again to break out. Elements of the 74th Regiment, together with cavalry and sappers, managed to reach Kielce on 5 September. Most of the division, however, suffered such heavy losses that it was unable to fight any longer. In the early afternoon of 4 September, the division surrendered to the Germans.

== World War II and after 1945 ==
After the Sikorski–Mayski agreement of 1941, in February of the following year the 7th Division was recreated in the Soviet Union as part of the Anders Army/Polish Armed Forces in the East. Withdrawn to Persia, it was disbanded and its units were attached to the 6th Division.

During the Operation Tempest, the division was recreated by the Radom–Kielce inspectorate of Armia Krajowa. Composed of two regiments (27th and 74th), it took part in heavy fights against the Germans. After central Poland had been taken over by the Soviet Army, the majority of its soldiers returned to the underground, risking arrest by the omnipotent NKVD (see Cursed soldiers).

At the same time one of the units of the Polish People's Army formed under guidance of the Soviet Union received the same number (see pl:7 Łużycka Dywizja Piechoty). Formed north of Lublin, it was formed of three infantry regiments and one artillery regiment. Insufficiently equipped and trained, the unit was attached to the Second Army and dispatched to the front near Rothernburg, where it stormed the Lusatian Neisse river with heavy casualties. After several days of heavy fighting on a bridgehead to the west of the river, the division was levied and withdrawn to the rear.

After the war ended, the PPA 7th Infantry Division, under the control of the Second Army, was assigned to protect the Mużakowa – Kopaczów section of the western border. The divisional headquarters was stationed at Lubań, with regimental staff at Mirsk (33rd Infantry Regiment), Zgorzelec (35th Infantry Regiment), Bogatynia (37th Infantry Regiment), and Jędrzychowice (38th Artillery Regiment). Since 1947, the sub-units became a part of Operational Group Wisła.

Before being transferred from OW IV to OW V, in 1949 the division was stationed as follows:

- Divisional headquarters – Bytom
- 33rd Nysa Infantry Regiment – Nysa
- 35 Infantry Regiment – Tarnowskie Góry
- 37 Infantry Regiment – Chorzów
- 38 Light Artillery Regiment – Kędzierzyn-Koźle
- 10 Anti-tank artillery squadron – Tarnowskie Góry
- 18 Sapper Battalion – Bytom
- Communications Company 27 – Bytom

In accordance with Ordinance No. 0026/Org. of the Minister of National Defence, on 4 September 1956, the 7 Łużycka Infantry Division was reorganized as the 2nd Warsaw Mechanized Division. The division headquarters was at Nysa.

== Commandants of the Division 1919–1939 ==
- General Adam Mokrzecki (9 – 29 V 1919),
- General Leonard Skierski (V – VII 1919),
- General Bronislaw Babianski (VII – X 1919),
- General Franciszek Latinik (XI 1919 – III 1920),
- General Karol Schubert (III 1920 – VI 1921),
- General Eugeniusz Pogorzelski (VII 1921 – II 1923),
- General Emil Prochaska (III 1923 – VII 1925),
- General Stanislaw Wroblewski (X 1925 – V 1926),
- General Mieczyslaw Dabkowski (VI 1926 – XII 1933),
- General Wacław Stachiewicz (XII 1933 – 5 VI 1935),
- General Janusz Gąsiorowski (5 VI 1935 – IX 1939).

== Bibliography for 1919–39 7th Infantry Division ==
- Piotr Zarzycki, Plan mobilizacyjny „W". Wykaz oddziałów mobilizowanych na wypadek wojny, Pruszków 1995, ISBN 83-85621-87-3.
- Tadeusz Jurga: Wojsko Polskie : krótki informator historyczny o Wojsku Polskim w latach II wojny światowej. 7, Regularne jednostki Wojska Polskiego w 1939 : organizacja, działania bojowe, uzbrojenie, metryki związków operacyjnych, dywizji i brygad. Warszawa : Wydawnictwo Ministerstwa Obrony Narodowej 1975.
- Wyszczelski, Lech (2006), Wojsko Polskie w latach 1918-1921, Warszawa: Wydawnictwo Neriton, ISBN 83-89729-56-3
- Jagiełło, Zdzisław (2007), Piechota Wojska Polskiego 1918-1939, Warszawa: Bellona, ISBN 978-83-11-10206-4
- "Almanach oficerski": praca zbiorowa, Wojskowy Instytut Naukowo-Wydawniczy, Warszawa 1923
- "Księga chwały piechoty": komitet redakcyjny pod przewodnictwem płk. dypl. Bolesława Prugara Ketlinga, Departament Piechoty MSWojsk, Warszawa 1937–1939. Reprint: Wydawnictwo Bellona Warszawa 1992

== See also ==
- Polish army order of battle in 1939
- Polish contribution to World War II
- List of Polish divisions in World War II
