= Kiedrzyn, Częstochowa =

Kiedrzyn
- Dzielnica of Częstochowa
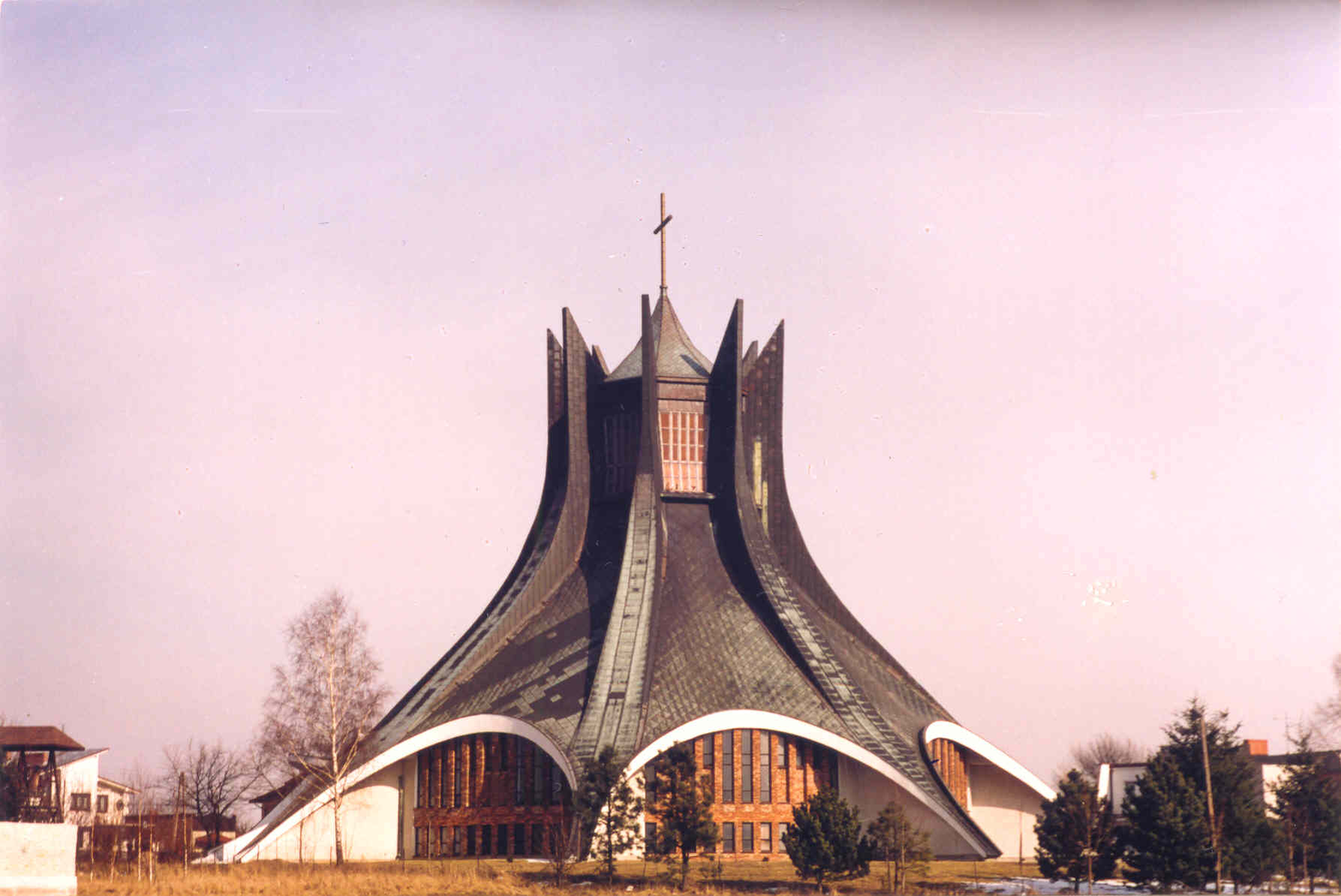
- Church of St. Brother Albert in Kiedrzyn

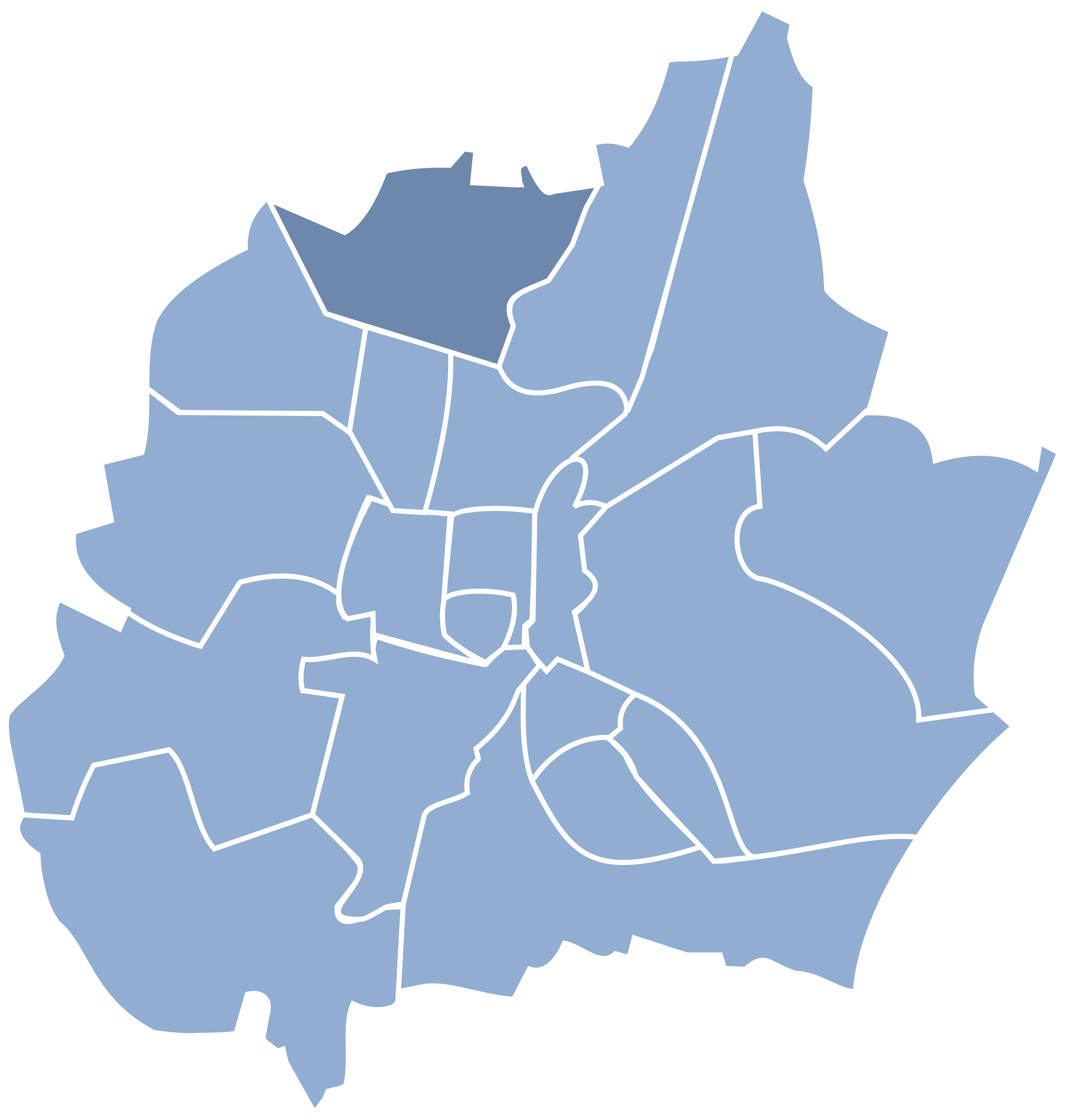
- Location of Kiedrzyn within Częstochowa
- Coordinates: 50.847°N 19.107°E
- Country: Poland
- Voivodeship: Silesian
- County/City: Częstochowa

Government
  - District Chairman: Mariusz Musiał

Area
  - Total: 7.77 km^{2} (3.00 sq mi)

Population (2014)
  - Total: 2,940
  - Density: 378/km^{2} (980/sq mi)
- Time zone: UTC+1 (CET)
  - Summer (DST): UTC+2 (CEST)
- Area code: (+48) 34

Kiedrzyn is a dzielnica (district) of Częstochowa, Silesian Voivodeship, southern Poland. It is located in the north-west part of the city, between roads to Łask and Działoszyn. Kiedrzyn has an area of 7.77 km^{2} and on April 30, 2014 had 2,940 inhabitants.

Kiedrzyn is called "the district of florists" - majority of the houses have their own greenhouses.

In district is located local sport club Orzeł Kiedrzyn and since 1922 Volunteer Fire Brigade. In Kiedrzyn are 2 churches: Church of St. Brother Albert Chmielowski and Church of St. Andrew Bobola.

Kiedrzyn is connected to the city by public transport. The bus line number 13 runs through the district.
