= Wrzosowa =

- Village
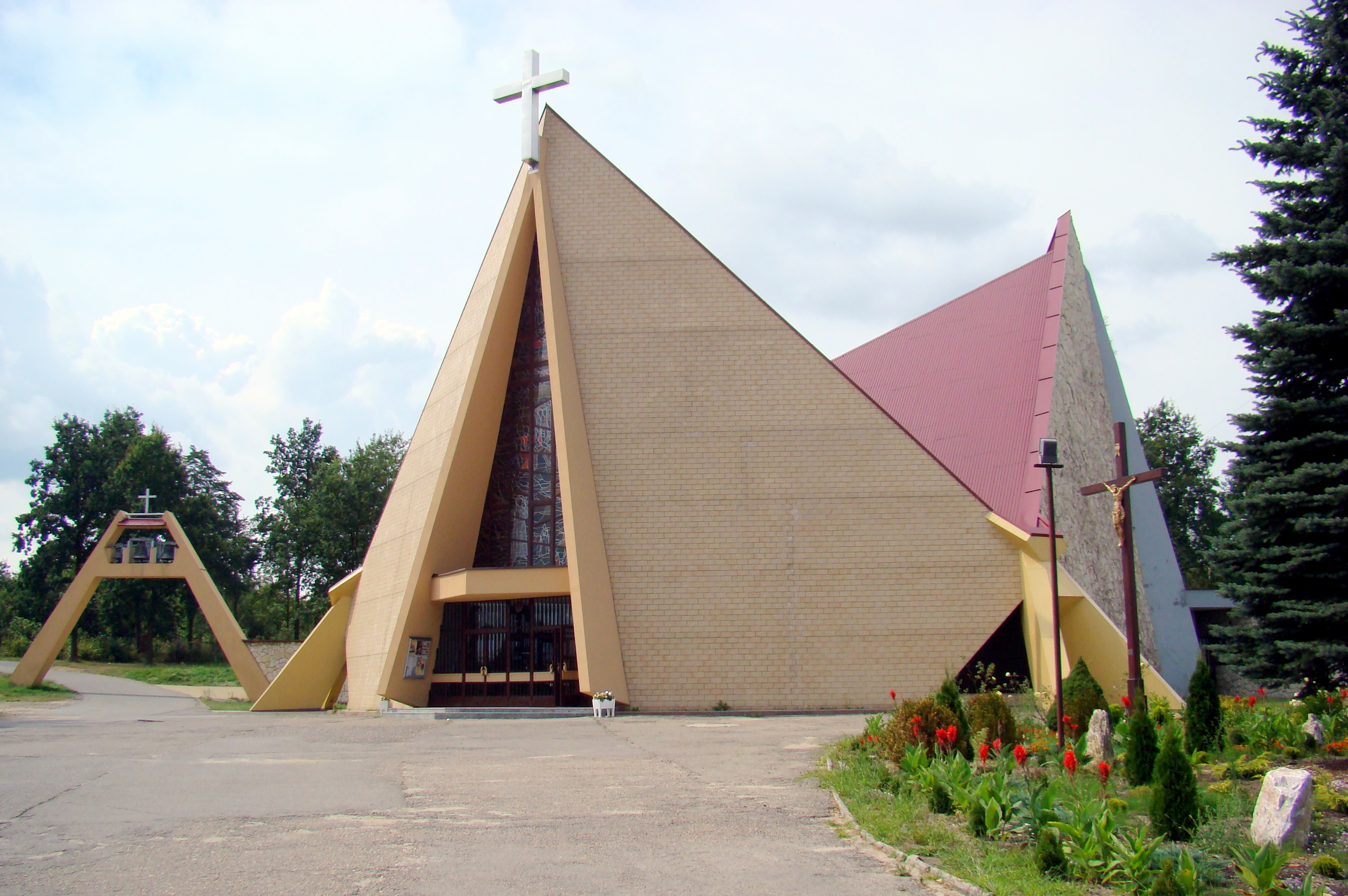
- Church of Corpus Christi

- Location within Poland
- Coordinates: 50°44′N 19°8′E
- Country: Poland
- Voivodeship: Silesian
- County: Częstochowa
- Gmina: Poczesna

Population
  - Total: 1,889

Wrzosowa [vʐɔˈsɔva] is a village in the administrative district of Gmina Poczesna, within Częstochowa County, Silesian Voivodeship, in southern Poland.
