= Truskolasy, Silesian Voivodeship =

Truskolasy
- Village
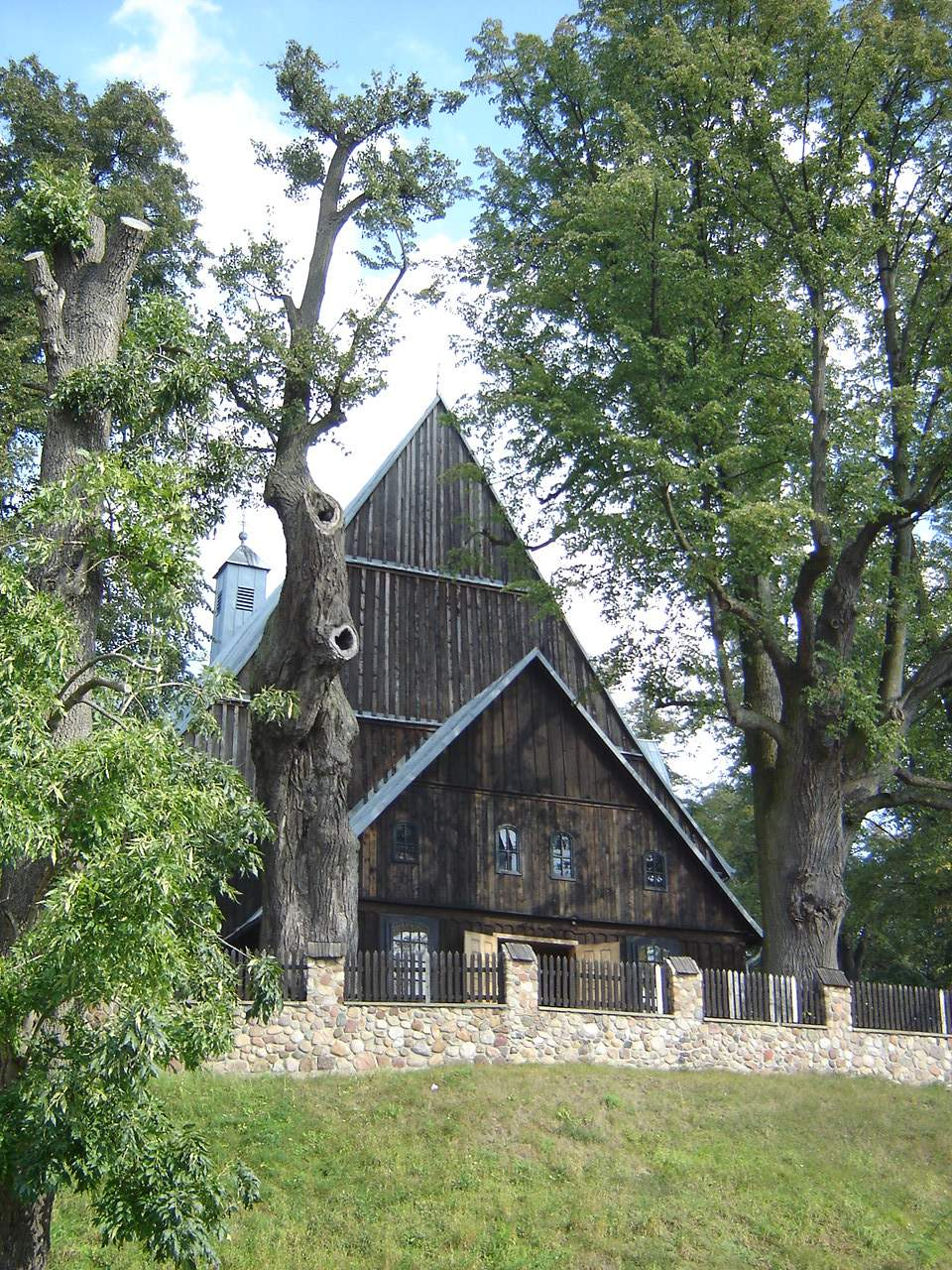
- Baroque church in Truskolasy

- Location within Poland
- Coordinates: 50°51′04″N 18°49′38″E
- Country: Poland
- Voivodeship: Silesian
- County: Kłobuck
- Gmina: Wręczyca Wielka
- Population (2008): 2,044

Truskolasy [truskɔˈlasɨ] is a village in the administrative district of Gmina Wręczyca Wielka, within Kłobuck County, Silesian Voivodeship, in southern Poland. Between 1975 and 1998 Truskolasy belonged to Częstochowa Voivodeship.

The village has a wooden Baroque church.

== Notable residents ==
The Polish footballer Jakub Błaszczykowski and former head coach of the Poland national football team Jerzy Brzęczek were born in Truskolasy.
