= Węglowice =

- Village
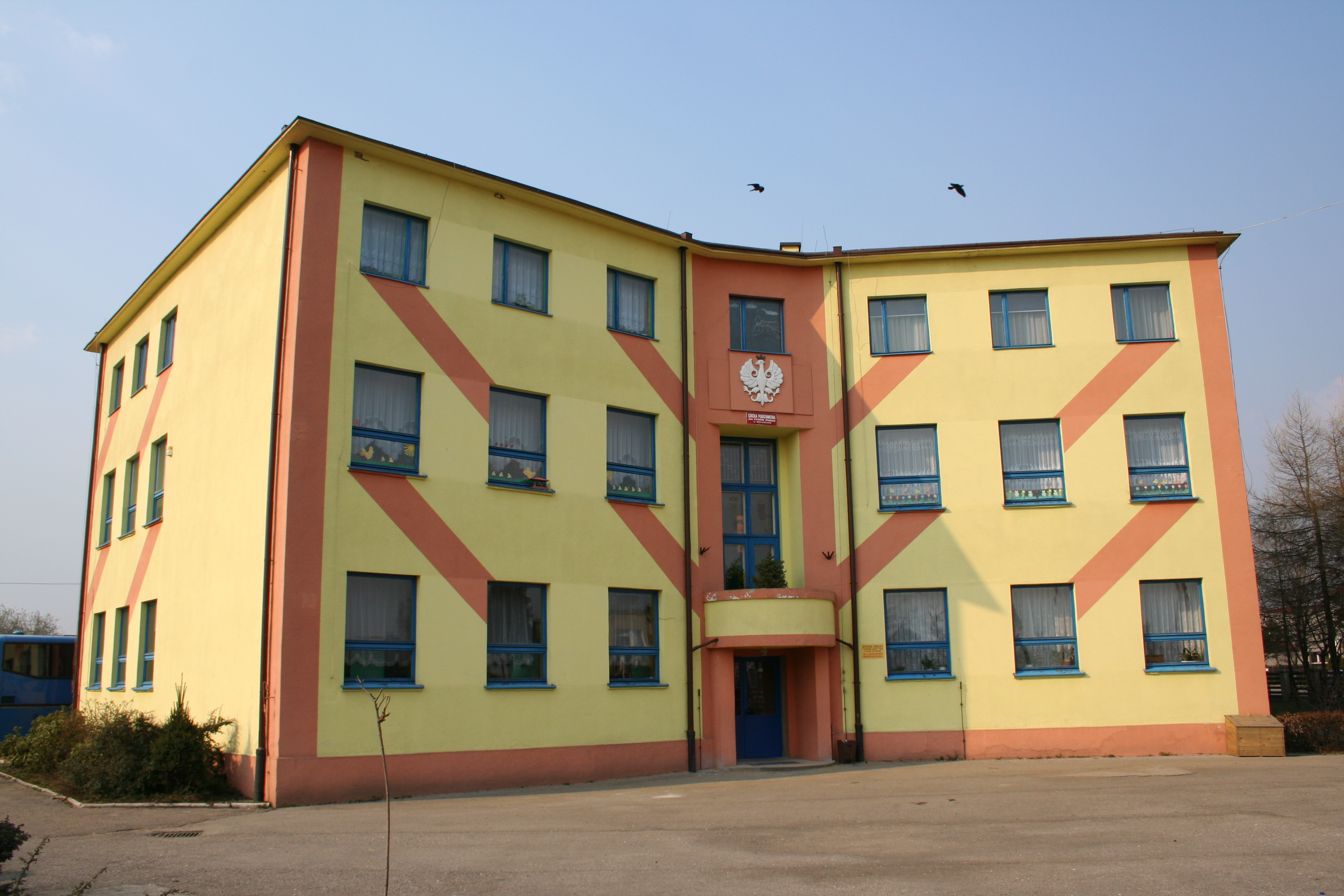
- Local school

- Location within Poland
- Coordinates: 50°48′N 18°50′E
- Country: Poland
- Voivodeship: Silesian
- County: Kłobuck
- Gmina: Wręczyca Wielka
- Population: 367
- Website: http://www.weglowice.pl

Węglowice [vɛnɡlɔˈvit͡sɛ] is a village in the administrative district of Gmina Wręczyca Wielka, within Kłobuck County, Silesian Voivodeship, in southern Poland.

The village was established by German settlers at the turn of the 19th century together with Puszczew.
