= 2008 Poland tornado outbreak =

Weather event in Poland

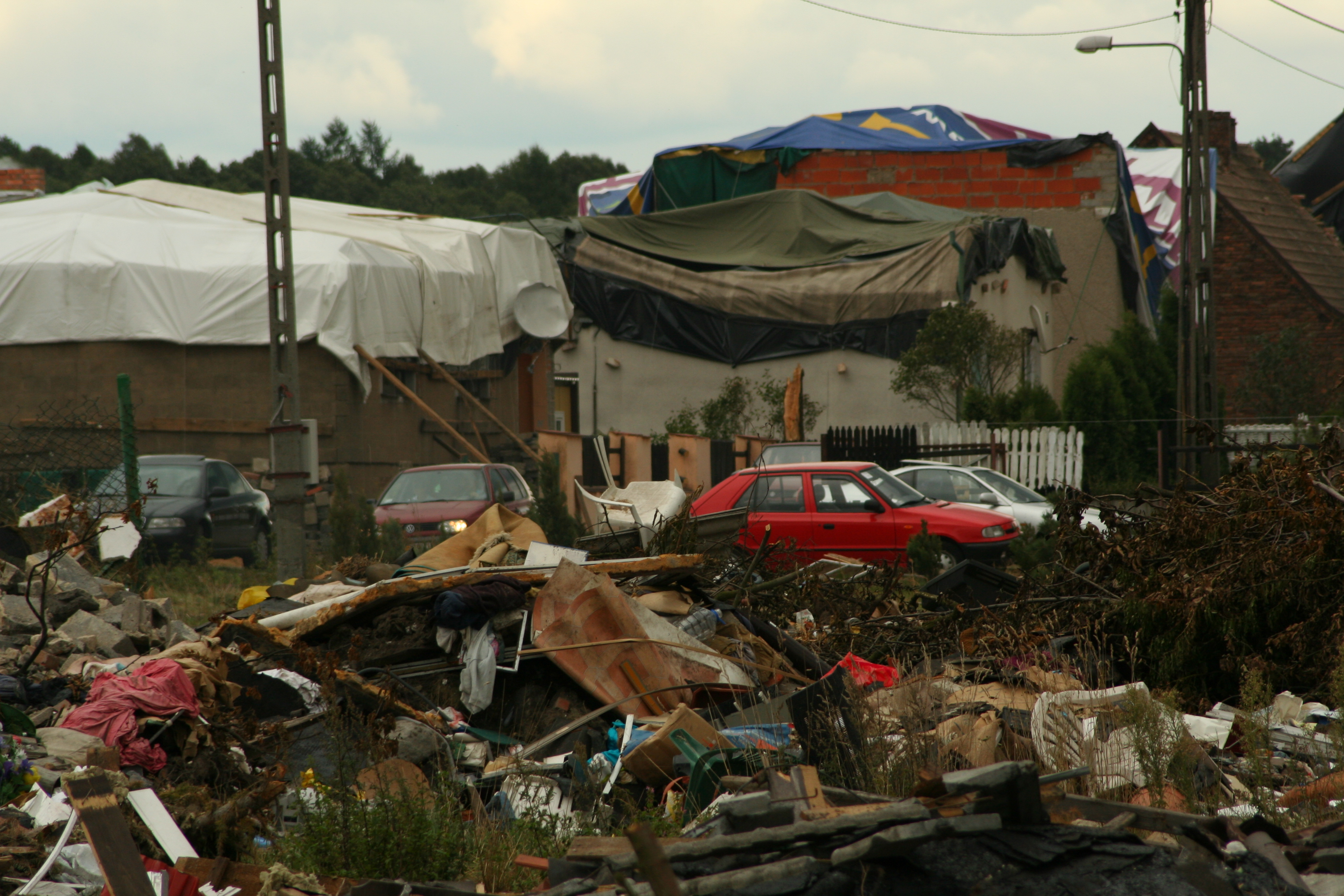
- Damages in Kalina, Poland

Meteorological history
- Date: 15 August 2008

Tornado outbreak
- Tornadoes: 5
- Max. rating: F4 (Later revised to IF3 in 2024) (Fujita scale); T8 (TORRO scale)
- Duration: 14 hours, 45 minutes

Overall effects
- Fatalities: 2 (+2 non-tornadic)
- Injuries: 55 (+10 non-tornadic)
- Damage: Unknown

A tornado outbreak struck southern and central Poland on 15 August 2008. Overall, it killed two people. Tornadoes affected Opole Voivodeship, Silesian Voivodeship and Łódź Voivodeship. The European Storm Forecast Experiment issued a Level 3 which means there could potentially be a major severe thunderstorm outbreak.

== Tornado outbreak ==
Several supercells formed in southern Poland on August 15, 2008 and produced several significant tornadoes that resulted in many casualties and significant damage. The outbreak began when a weak tornado touched down in Knurów causing little damage. Later in the day, another and main supercell of the event with a BWER and a visible hook echo produced its first tornado, a large multiple-vortex that struck the villages of Dolnica, Kopanina, Zimna Wódka, Kolonia Jaryszów, Sieroniowice, Balcarzowice, Nakło, Skały, Błotnica Strzelecka and Dąbrówka with a total path of 20 km (12 mi), damaging or destroying hundreds of buildings and wounding 15 people, with a width of 1,000 m (0.62 mi) before dissipating in a wooded area. It was given a rating of a very rare F4(T8). The supercell produced another multiple-vortex tornado near Piłka and struck the northern side of town, causing little damage. Northeast of Rusinowice the tornado quickly became large and destroyed a large swath of forest, its path still clearly visible on satellite imagery today. The tornado then hit the western suburbs of Kalina where it killed one person and remained strong as it struck the city of Blachownia. In Mykanów, this tornado flipped a bus while it was crossing a highway. At 16:32 UTC the same supercell produced another F3 which struck the west part of Radomsko, destroying or damaging about 100 houses on a path of about 30 km (19 mi). Another F0 tornado touched down in Radom, associated with a different supercell, before activity on the 15th ended. On March 7, 2024, the strongest tornadoes of the outbreak were updated to IF3 on the International Fujita scale, yet still the F4 rating is active till today for many sources.

== Confirmed tornadoes ==
Confirmed tornadoes by Fujita rating
FU	F0	F1	F2	F3	F4	F5	Total
1	1	0	0	3	0	0	5

List of reported tornadoes - Friday, 15 August 2008
F#	T#	Location	District/ County	Coord.	Time (UTC)	Path length	Comments/Damage
Poland
FU	TU	Knurów	Gliwice	50.22°N 18.67°E	425	Unknown	A short-lived tornado confirmed near Knurów.
IF3	T7	Jaryszów	Strzelce	50.47°N 18.37°E	1448	20 km (12 mi)	See section on this tornado – 15 people were injured.
IF3	T6	NE of Rusinowice to S of Łęg	Lubliniec	50.73°N 18.88°E	1528	60 km (37 mi)	2 deaths – See section on this tornado – 40 people were injured.
IF3	T6	W of Radomsko to Stara Wieś	Radomsko	51.07°N 19.45°E	1632	30 km (19 mi)	Intense multiple-vortex tornado. Moving north-northeastward, it moved into the western part of the city and damaged more than 100 houses and the damage cost was estimated at 20 million Polish złoty. In Gomunice, 20 buildings were damaged and 2 buildings were completely destroyed. In Gorzkowice, a truck trailer was carried dozens of metres away and destroyed. At times, the tornado was not fully condensed.
F0	T1	Radom	Radom	51.42°N 21.20°E	1900	2.5 km (1.6 mi)	A high-end F0 tornado passed through a largely populated area.
Sources: ESSL Severe Weather Database

== Notable tornadoes ==
=== Jaryszów tornado ===
Jaryszów tornado
Meteorological history
- Date: August 15, 2008

IF3 tornado
- on the International Fujita scale

T7 tornado
- on the TORRO scale
- Highest winds: ≥187 mph (301 km/h)

Overall effects
- Fatalities: 0
- Injuries: 15

This near-violent tornado started at 15:00 UTC (17:00 local time) just north-east of Dolnica, cutting down trees and power poles. The multiple-vortex tornado continued its path and struck the village of Kopanina causing serious damage to homes. The wedge tornado changed direction pointing to the south side of the city of Zimna Wódka, where 15–20 buildings were damaged or destroyed. The tornado changed direction again and struck Kolonia Jaryszów. There the tornado reached a maximum width of 1,000 m (0.62 mi) and many buildings were damaged or destroyed. On the A4 highway, cars and trucks were thrown tens of meters away and the trees were debarked. Crossing the highway, the tornado reached its peak intensity and struck Sieroniowice and Balcarzowice, where many buildings were almost razed to the ground and some people were injured. After Balcarzowice the tornado struck Błotnica Strzelecka, causing F2 (T5) damage. Still weakening, the tornado struck the forest between Błotnica Strzelecka and Dąbrówka causing sporadic F1-F2 damage before dissipating. The tornado was classified as an F3/T7 damaging about 150 buildings and injuring 15 people.

=== Rusinowice-Łęg tornado ===
Rusinowice-Łęg tornado
Meteorological history
- Date: August 15, 2008

IF3 tornado
- on the International Fujita scale

T6 tornado
- on the TORRO scale
- Highest winds: ≥161 mph (259 km/h)

Overall effects
- Fatalities: 2
- Injuries: 40

The second tornado from the main supercell formed near Piłka and then struck the north side of the town at 15:30 UTC, producing little damage. The tornado continued on to Rusinowice, where it significantly intensified into a strong tornado as it passed through the southern and eastern part of the town. One person was killed when a building collapsed. The tornado continued to quickly intensify and expand as it moved northeast of Rusinowice, where it snapped, uprooted, and debarked hundreds of trees in a forest. The tornado reached its maximum width of 900 m (980 yd) north of Ciesnowia, clipping the northern side of town and leveling entire swaths of forest, denuding and debarking hundreds of trees. The tornado then continued moving north-northeast and caused its worst damage in the western suburbs of Kalina, where many homes were leveled. One person lost their life in this area from a falling tree. The tornado then turned to the northeast near Częstochowa, producing more tree damage before it struck Blachownia, still causing severe damage. At 16:20 UTC the tornado struck the town of Mykanów, hitting the southern and the eastern part of the town, tearing roofs off. Crossing the national road 1, the tornado lifted a bus, injuring 40 people inside, 10 seriously. While weakinkng, the tornado struck Grabowa and Bogusławice causing T4 (F2) damage and low F1 damage in Kruszyna before it dissipated south of Łęg in Silesian Voivodeship. The parent supercell brought 4 centimetres (1.6 inches) hail to some places while the tornado was in progress.

== Effects ==
In total, 2 people were killed and about 1624 buildings sustained damage. It was strongest tornado outbreak in Poland in many years. Many downbursts occurred between Slovakia and Poland, some with winds up to 140–150 km/h (87–93 mph) causing severe damage to some towns and 2 deaths in Slovakia. Large hail caused injuries and destruction; in Poland the hail reached 8–9 cm (3.1–3.5 in), injuring 10 people.

== See also ==
- August 2008 European tornado outbreak
