= Prądy =

Prądy may refer to the following places:

- Prądy, Opole Voivodeship (south-west Poland)
- Prądy, Pomeranian Voivodeship (north Poland)
- Prądy, Silesian Voivodeship (south Poland)
