= RDG-2 =

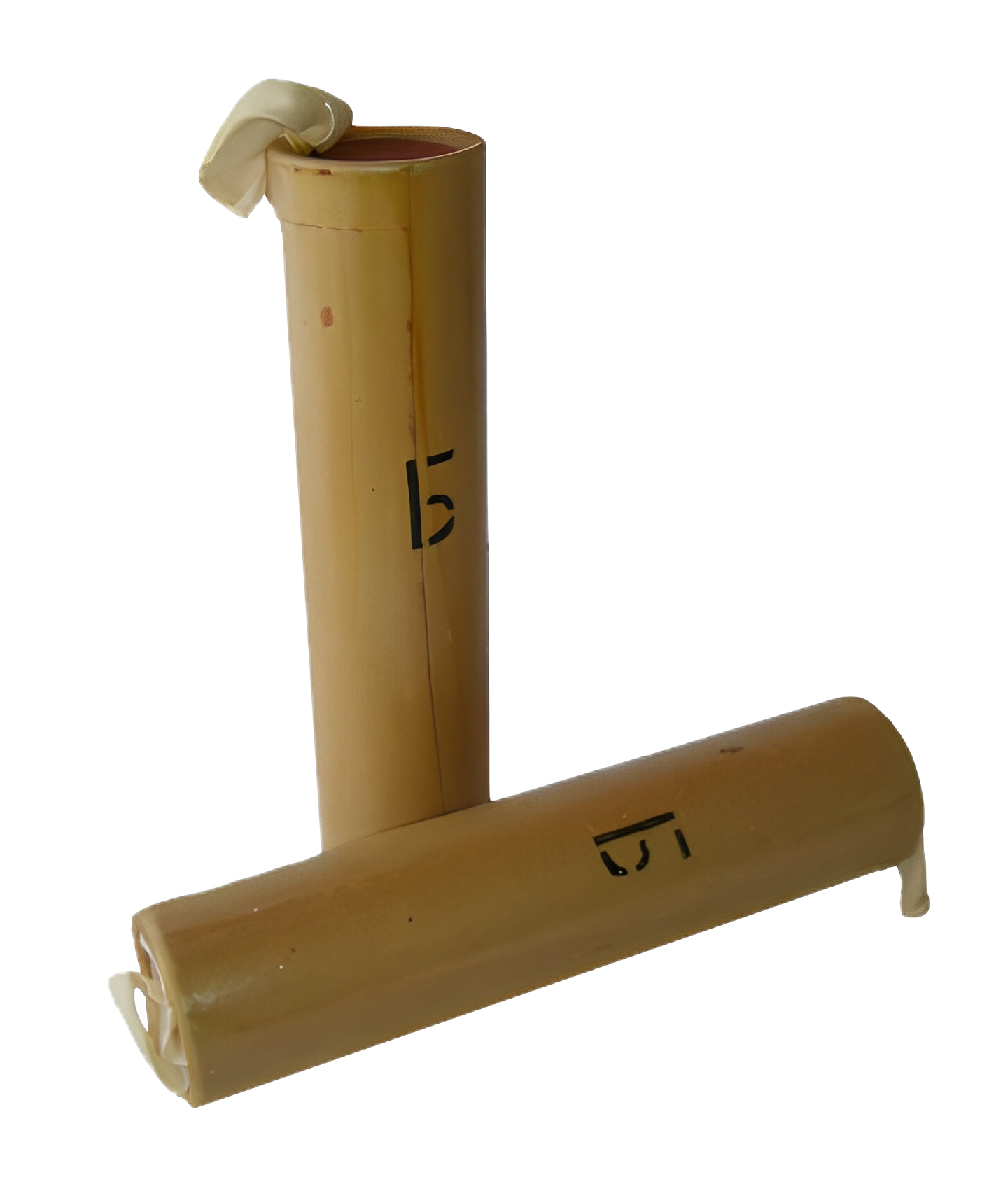
- RDG-2B variant
- Type: Smoke grenade
- Place of origin: Soviet Union

Specifications
- Mass: 500 g

RDG-2 (Russian: РДГ-2) is a hand-held smoke grenade of Soviet design.

== Design ==
Initially as a handheld smoke grenade RDG; it had the shape of a cylinder, was made of cardboard and weighed about 0.5 kg. It produced a smoke screen up to 30 meters long and 5–8 m wide. The time of intensive smoking of the grenade was 60–90 seconds. The grenade was ignited by rubbing the grenade fuse with a rub. The troops were supplied with grenades emitting white or black smoke.

Smoke grenades with a cap were also developed. A uniquely designed cap allowed the RDG smoke grenade to be fired from a 7.62 mm rifle-grenade launcher at a distance of up to 150 meters.

After firing the UNM cartridge, the pressure of the gunpowder gases caused the grenade to be thrown out and simultaneously ignited the grenade's fuse, and then the smoke-producing mixture.

The resulting smoke, in the case of close combat, blinded the enemy and created opportunities for maneuver for the team attacking the target.

The RDG-2 came in two types, white smoke and black smoke.

== Variants ==
=== RDG-2M ===
In the 1980s, the RDG-2 smoke grenades were modernized to the RDG-2M standard.

The difference between them is the use of a different smoke-producing mixture based on hexachloroethane. Thanks to its use, a larger amount of smoke with better masking properties was obtained.

The RDG-2M smoke grenade weighs about 600 g, smokes for about 50–70 seconds and creates a smoke screen measuring 50×10 m.

== Adoption ==
The RDG-2 is used during operations by individual soldiers and small units to create short-term smoke screens to mask their actions, as well as to blind enemy firing positions.

The RDG-2 was designated in Poland as RDG-2B and RDG-2CZ respectively. The RDG-2 was used by the Polish Army and Police, among others, as a means of simulating a battlefield.

In the 1950s, they were produced by the Explosive Materials Plant in Krywałd.

== Users ==
- Poland
- Soviet Union

== Bibliography ==
- Barański (zal.), Wojciech (1979). Podręcznik żołnierza wojsk zmechanizowanych. Warsaw: Wydawnictwo Ministerstwa Obrony Narodowej. Główny Zarząd Szkolenia Bojowego.
- Andrzej Ciepliński;; Ryszard Woźniak (1994), Encyklopedia współczesnej broni palnej, Warsaw: WiS, ISBN 83-86028-01-7, OCLC 169820275
- Nowak, Ireneusz (2001). Wybrane problemy historii polskiej techniki wojskowej XX wieku. Sprzęt i środki wojsk chemicznych. Vol. 2. Warsaw: Akademia Obrony Narodowej. ISBN 8388062816.
