= Nowy Dwór, Lubliniec County =

Nowy Dwór
- Settlement
- Location within Poland
- Coordinates: 50°38′24″N 18°47′59″E
- Country: Poland
- Voivodeship: Silesian
- County: Lubliniec
- Gmina: Koszęcin

Nowy Dwór [ˈnɔvɨ ˈdvur] is a settlement in the administrative district of Gmina Koszęcin, within Lubliniec County, Silesian Voivodeship, in southern Poland.
