= Wikłów =

- Village
- Location within Poland
- Coordinates: 50°59′N 19°17′E
- Country: Poland
- Voivodeship: Silesian
- County: Częstochowa
- Gmina: Kruszyna
- Population: 174

Wikłów [ˈvikwuf] is a village in the administrative district of Gmina Kruszyna, within Częstochowa County, Silesian Voivodeship, in southern Poland.
