= Baby, Silesian Voivodeship =

Village in Silesia

Baby
- Village
- Location within Poland
- Coordinates: 50°57′N 19°19′E
- Country: Poland
- Voivodeship: Silesian
- County: Częstochowa
- Gmina: Kruszyna
- Population: 305

Baby [ˈbabɨ] is a village in the administrative district of Gmina Kruszyna, within Częstochowa County, Silesian Voivodeship, in southern Poland.
