= Pieńki Szczepockie =

- Village
- Location within Poland
- Coordinates: 51°0′N 19°20′E
- Country: Poland
- Voivodeship: Silesian
- County: Częstochowa
- Gmina: Kruszyna

Population
  - Total: 81

Pieńki Szczepockie [ˈpjɛɲki ʂt͡ʂɛˈpɔt͡skʲɛ] is a village in the administrative district of Gmina Kruszyna, within Częstochowa County, Silesian Voivodeship, in southern Poland.
