= Bukowiec, Silesian Voivodeship =

Bukowiec
- Village
- Location within Poland
- Coordinates: 50°36′N 18°56′E
- Country: Poland
- Voivodeship: Silesian
- County: Lubliniec
- Gmina: Koszęcin
- Population: 191

Bukowiec [buˈkɔvjɛt͡s] is a village in the administrative district of Gmina Koszęcin, within Lubliniec County, Silesian Voivodeship, in southern Poland.
