= Brusiek =

- Village
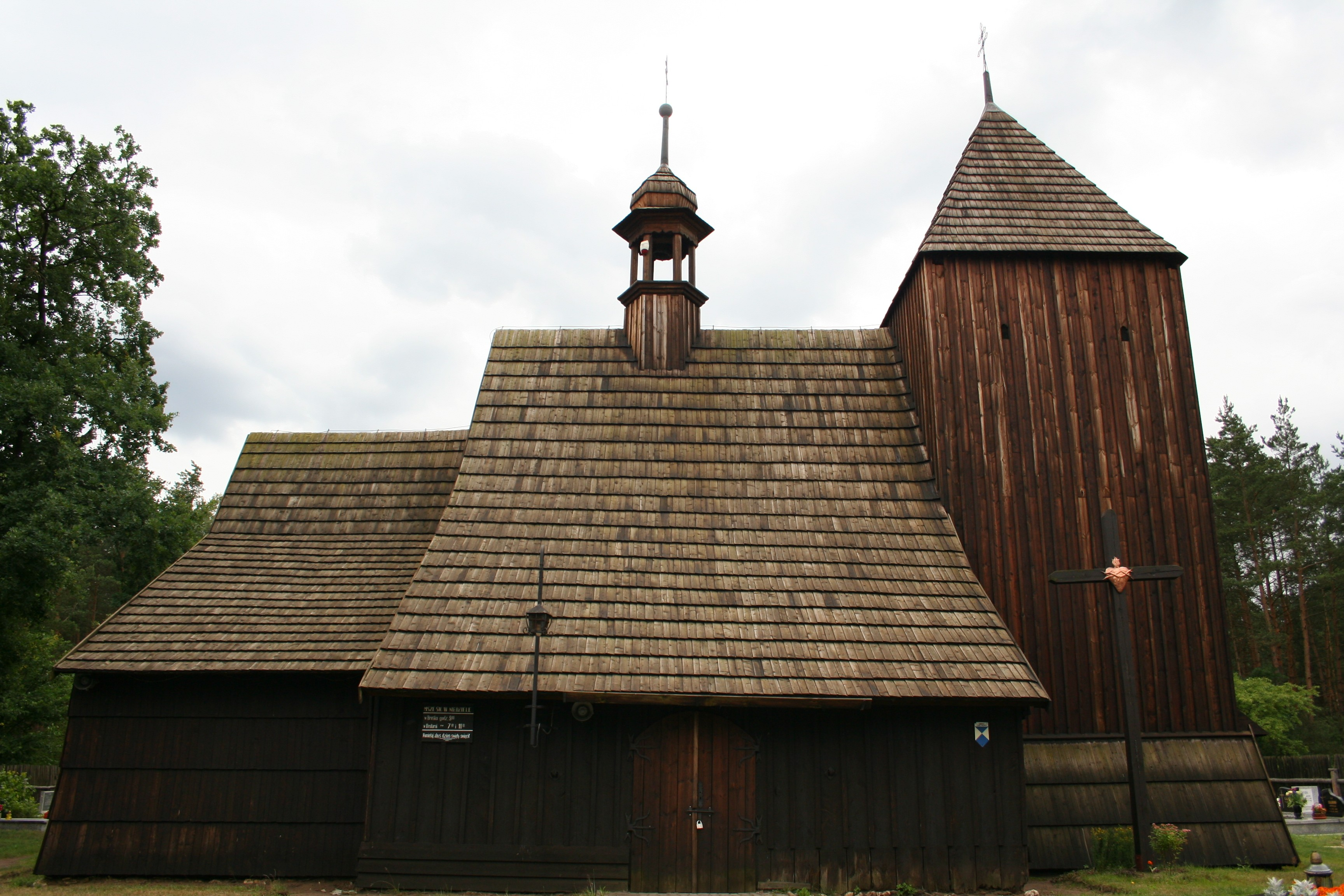
- Saint John the Baptist Church

- Location within Poland
- Coordinates: 50°34′N 18°48′E
- Country: Poland
- Voivodeship: Silesian
- County: Lubliniec
- Gmina: Koszęcin
- Population: 68

Brusiek [ˈbruɕɛk] is a village in the administrative district of Gmina Koszęcin, within Lubliniec County, Silesian Voivodeship, in southern Poland.
