= Cieszowa =

- Village
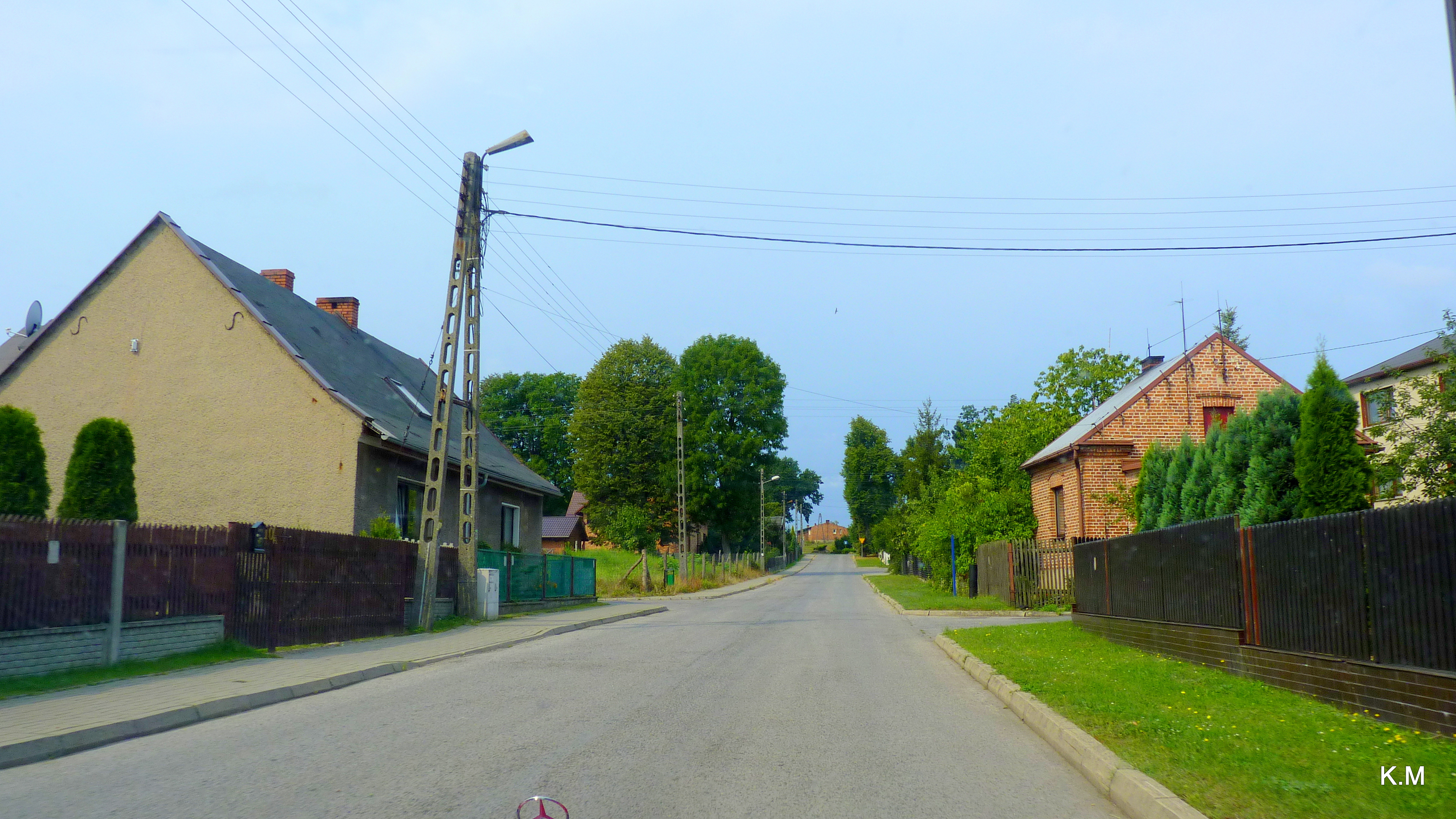

- Location within Poland
- Coordinates: 50°40′N 18°50′E
- Country: Poland
- Voivodeship: Silesian
- County: Lubliniec
- Gmina: Koszęcin
- Population: 288

Cieszowa [t͡ɕɛˈʂɔva] is a village in the administrative district of Gmina Koszęcin, within Lubliniec County, Silesian Voivodeship, in southern Poland.

== Monuments ==
There is a wooden church of St. Martin located in the village which was built in 1751, which is located on the Wooden Architecture Route of the Silesian Voivodeship.

Not far away from the village there is also a Jewish cemetery with Matzevah from the 19th and 20th centuries. It is said that this cemetery was built in the 18th century.

There is also an anachronistic statue of Pope St. Urban I who is the patron saint of the village where he is depicted wearing a papal tiara. This statue was built in 2005 for the 700 year anniversary since the creation of Cieszowa on the site of an old synagogue which was demolished in 1911.

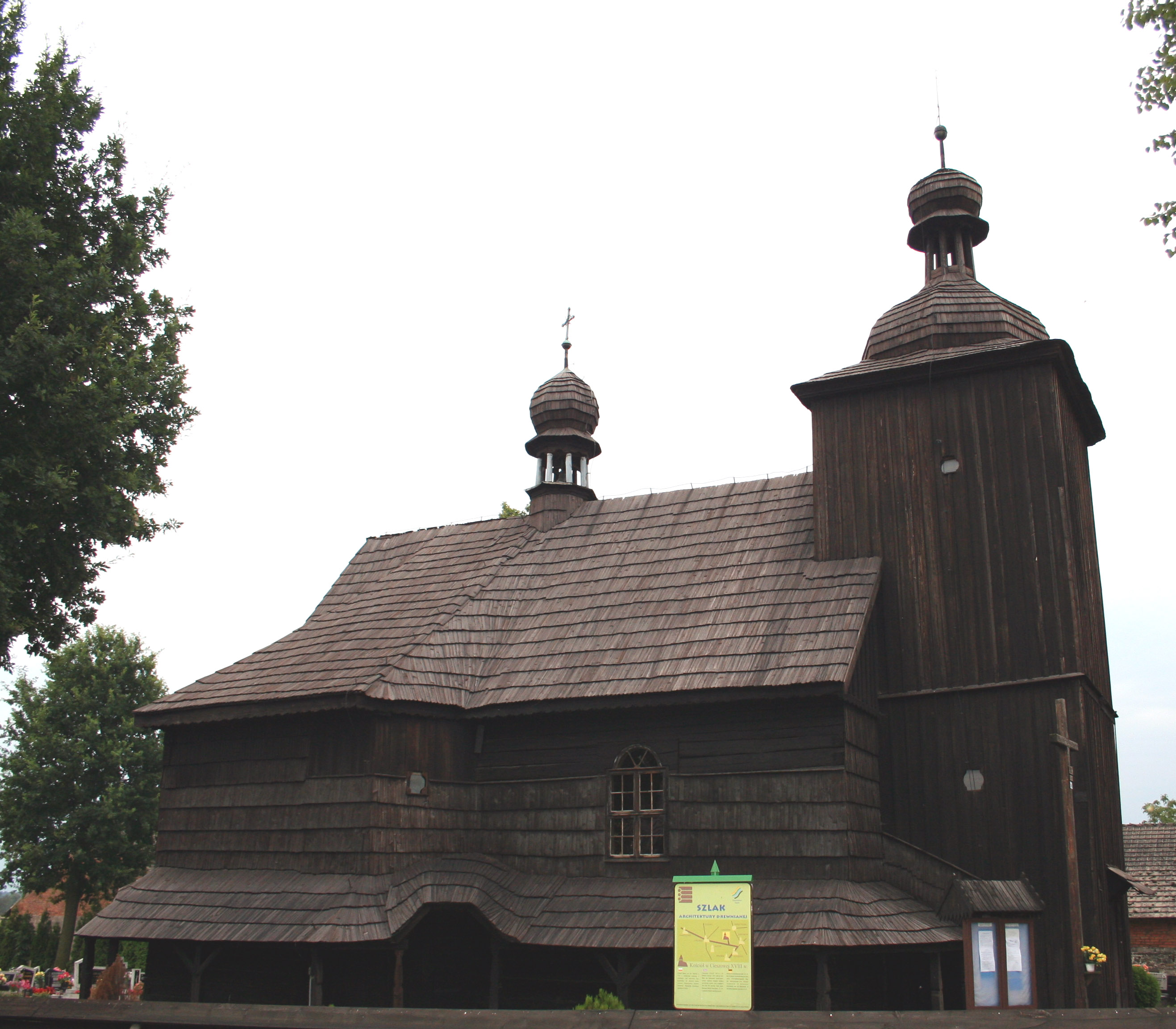
St. Martin's wooden church

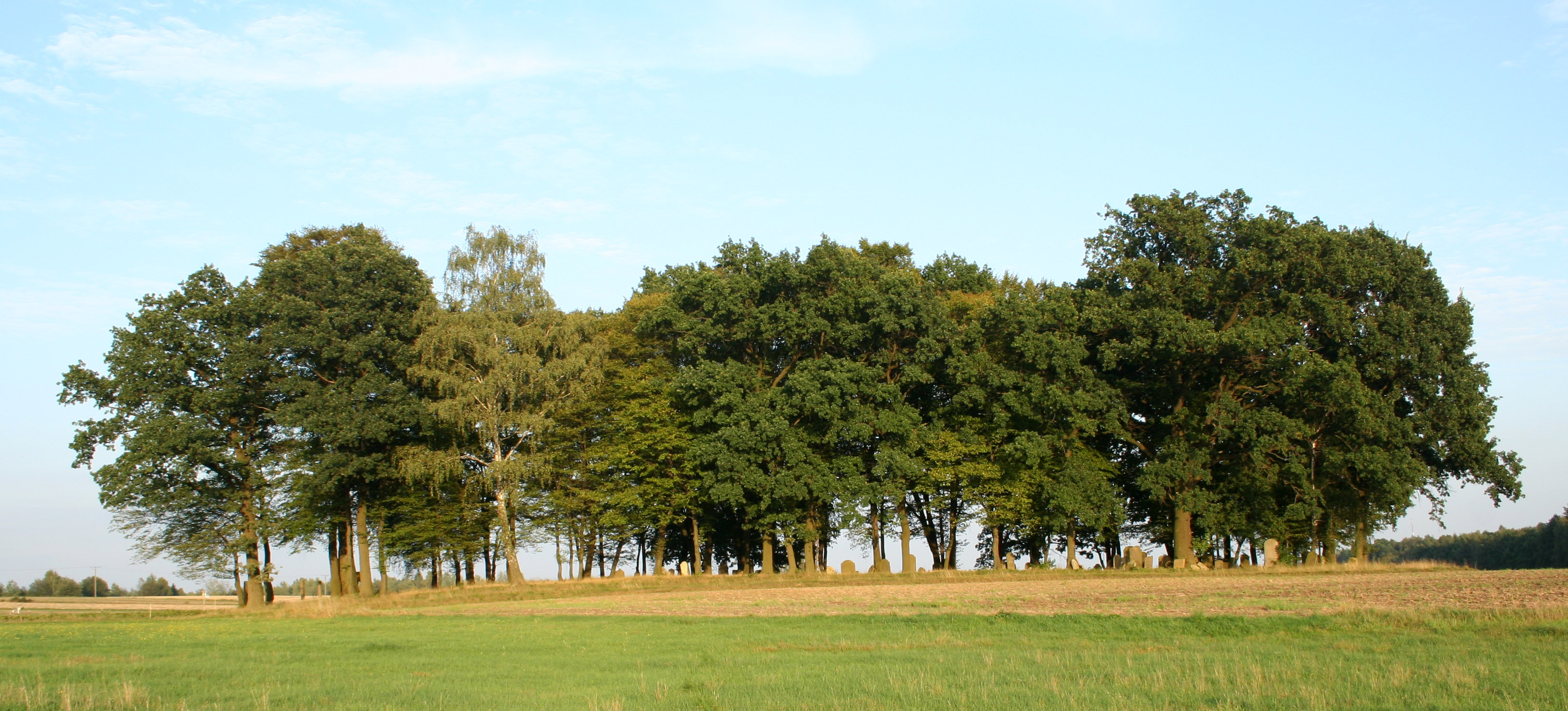
Jewish cemetery in Cieszowa

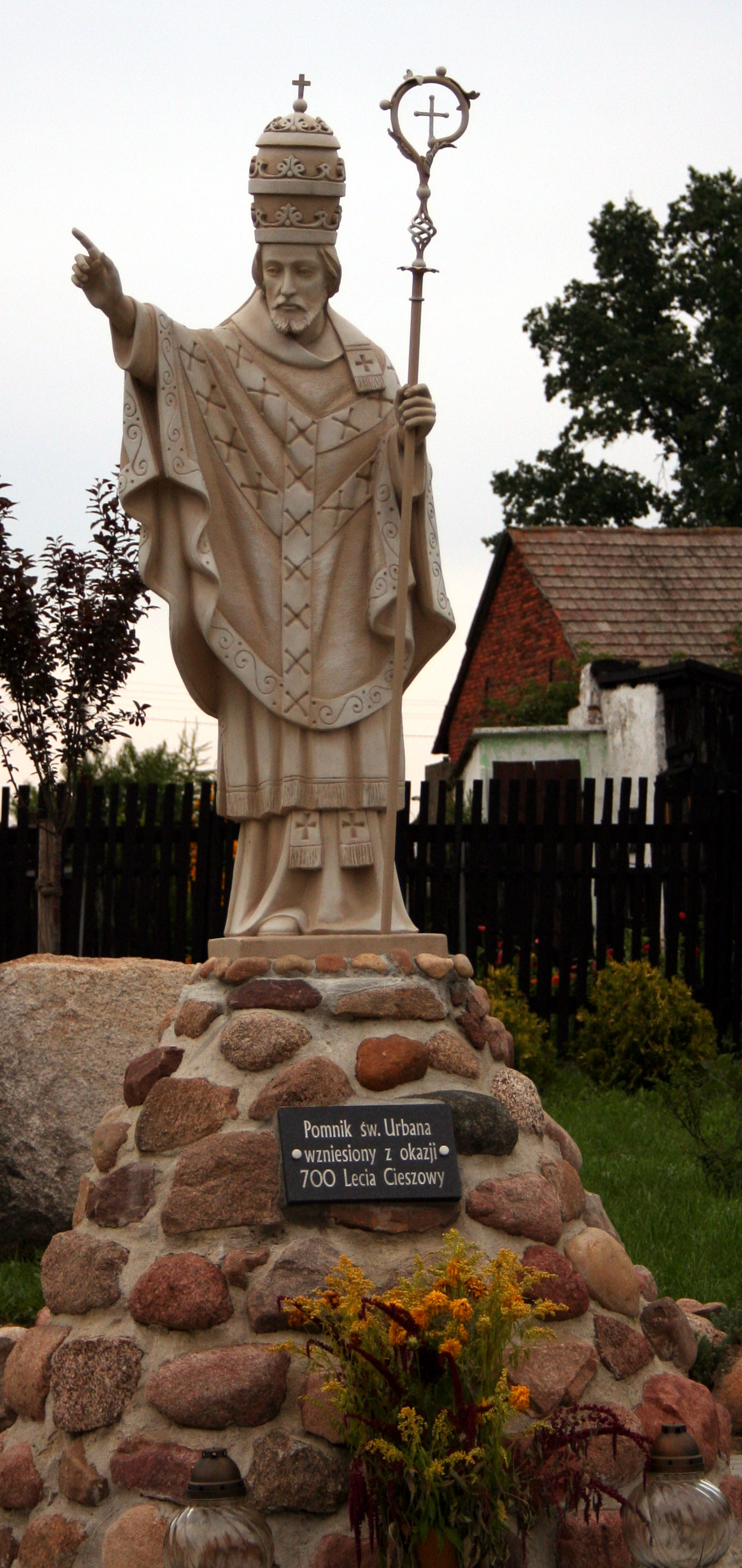
Statue of Pope St. Urban I
