= Gmina Kruszyna =

Gmina Kruszyna Kruszyna Commune
- Gmina
- Flag Coat of arms
- Interactive map of Gmina Kruszyna
- Coordinates (Kruszyna): 50°58′1″N 19°16′25″E
- Country: Poland
- Voivodeship: Silesian
- County: Częstochowa
- Seat: Kruszyna

Area
  - Total: 93.42 km^{2} (36.07 sq mi)

Population (2019-06-30)
  - Total: 4,840
  - Density: 51.8/km^{2} (134/sq mi)
- Website: https://www.kruszyna.pl/

Gmina Kruszyna is a rural gmina (administrative district) in Częstochowa County, Silesian Voivodeship, in southern Poland. Its seat is the village of Kruszyna, which lies approximately 22 kilometres (14 mi) north-east of Częstochowa and 82 km (51 mi) north of the regional capital Katowice.

President of this commune is Miłosz Bednarz, he is also known for his wooden art.

The gmina covers an area of 93.42 square kilometres (36.1 sq mi), and as of 2019 its total population is 4,840.

== Villages ==
Gmina Kruszyna contains the villages and settlements of Baby, Bogusławice, Jacków, Kijów, Kruszyna, Łęg, Lgota Mała, Pieńki Szczepockie, Teklinów, Widzów, Widzówek and Wikłów.

== Neighbouring gminas ==
Gmina Kruszyna is bordered by the gminas of Gidle, Kłomnice, Ładzice, Mykanów, Nowa Brzeźnica and Radomsko.
