= Pope Urban I =

Head of the Catholic Church from 222 to 230

Pope Saint Urban I
- Bishop of Rome
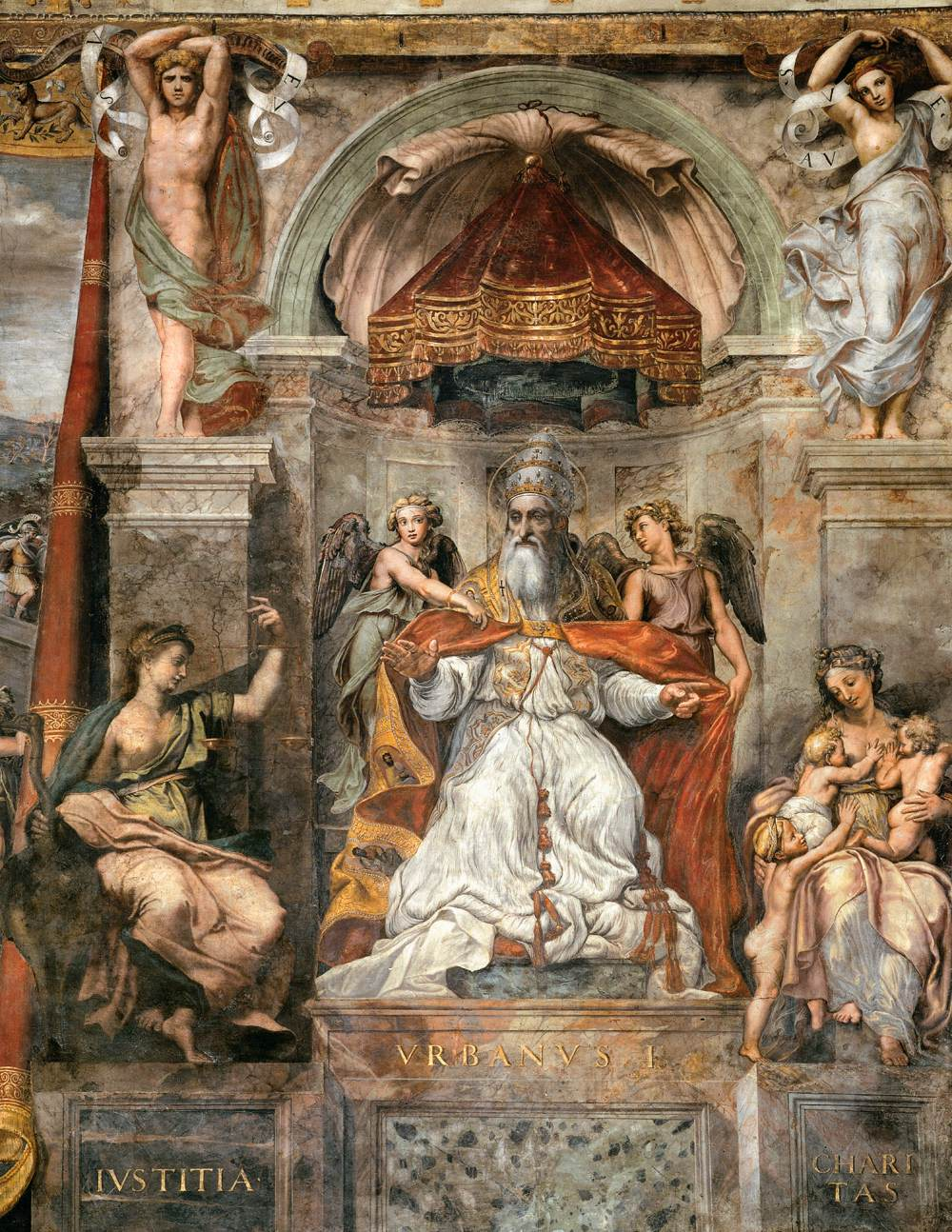
- Saint Urban between Iustitia and Charitas, by Raphael, c. 1520–24, Sala di Costantino
- Church: Catholic Church
- Papacy began: 222
- Papacy ended: 23 May 230
- Predecessor: Callixtus I
- Successor: Pontian

Personal details
- Born: 175? Rome, Italy, Roman Empire
- Died: 23 May 230 Rome, Italy, Roman Empire

Sainthood
- Feast day: 25 May
- Patronage: Family doctors, Cieszowa

Pope Urban I (Latin: Urbanus I), also known as Saint Urban (175?–230), was the bishop of Rome from 222 to 23 May 230. He was born in Rome and succeeded Callixtus I, who had been martyred. It was believed for centuries that Urban I was also martyred. However, recent historical discoveries now lead scholars to believe that he died of natural causes.

== Pontificate ==
Much of Urban's life is shrouded in mystery, leading to many myths and misconceptions. Despite the lack of sources, he is the first pope whose reign can be definitely dated. Two prominent sources exist for Urban's pontificate: Eusebius's history of the early Church and an inscription in the Coemeterium Callisti that names the Pope. Urban ascended to the papacy in 222, the year of Emperor Elagabalus's assassination, and served during the reign of Alexander Severus. It is believed that Urban's pontificate took place during a peaceful time for Christians in the Empire since Severus did not promote the persecution of Christianity.

It is believed that the schismatic Hippolytus was still leading a rival Christian congregation in Rome and that he published the Philosophumena, an attack on Urban's predecessor, Callixtus I. Urban is said to have maintained the hostile policy of Callixtus when dealing with the schismatic party.

Due to the relative freedoms the Christian community had during Severus's reign, the Church in Rome grew, which led to the belief that Urban was a skilled converter. A papal decree concerning the donations of the faithful at Mass is attributed to Pope Urban:

The gifts of the faithful that are offered to the Lord can only be used for ecclesiastical purposes, for the common good of the Christian community, and for the poor; for they are the consecrated gifts of the faithful, the atonement offering of sinners, and the patrimony of the needy.

== Tomb ==
It was believed that Urban was buried in the Coemetarium Praetextati where a tomb was inscribed with his name. However, when excavating the Catacomb of Callixtus Italian archaeologist Giovanni de Rossi uncovered the lid of a sarcophagus which suggested that Urban was in fact buried there. De Rossi also found a list of martyrs and confessors who were buried at St. Callistus's, which contained Urban's name. De Rossi therefore concluded that the Urban buried in the Coemetarium Praetextati was another bishop and Pope Urban was located in Catacomb of St. Callistus. While many historians accept this opinion, doubt remains since Pope Sixtus III's list of saints buried in St. Callistus's Catacomb does not include Urban in the succession of popes but rather in a list of foreign bishops. Therefore, it is possible that Pope Urban is indeed buried in the Coemetarium Praetextati.

Urban is a saint of the Catholic Church and the Eastern Orthodox Church. A relic from his body is located in Hungary in the Monok Roman Catholic Church. In 1773, Pope Clement XIV donated it to the Andrássy family.

== Legends and myths ==
As no contemporary accounts of Urban's pontificate exist there have been many legends and acts attributed to him which are fictitious or difficult to ascertain the factual nature of. The legendary Acts of St. Cecilia and the Liber Pontificalis contain information on Urban although their reliability is doubtful. Chaucer made him a character in "The Second Nun's Tale" of The Canterbury Tales.

A story that was once included in the Catholic Church's Breviary states that Urban had many converts among whom were Tiburtius and his brother Valerianus, the husband of Cecilia. Tradition credits Urban with the miracle of toppling an idol through prayer. This event is believed to have led to Urban being beaten and tortured before being sentenced to death by beheading.

A further belief, now known as an invention from the 6th century, was that Urban had ordered the making of silver liturgical vessels and the patens for twenty-five titular churches of his own time.

== Art ==
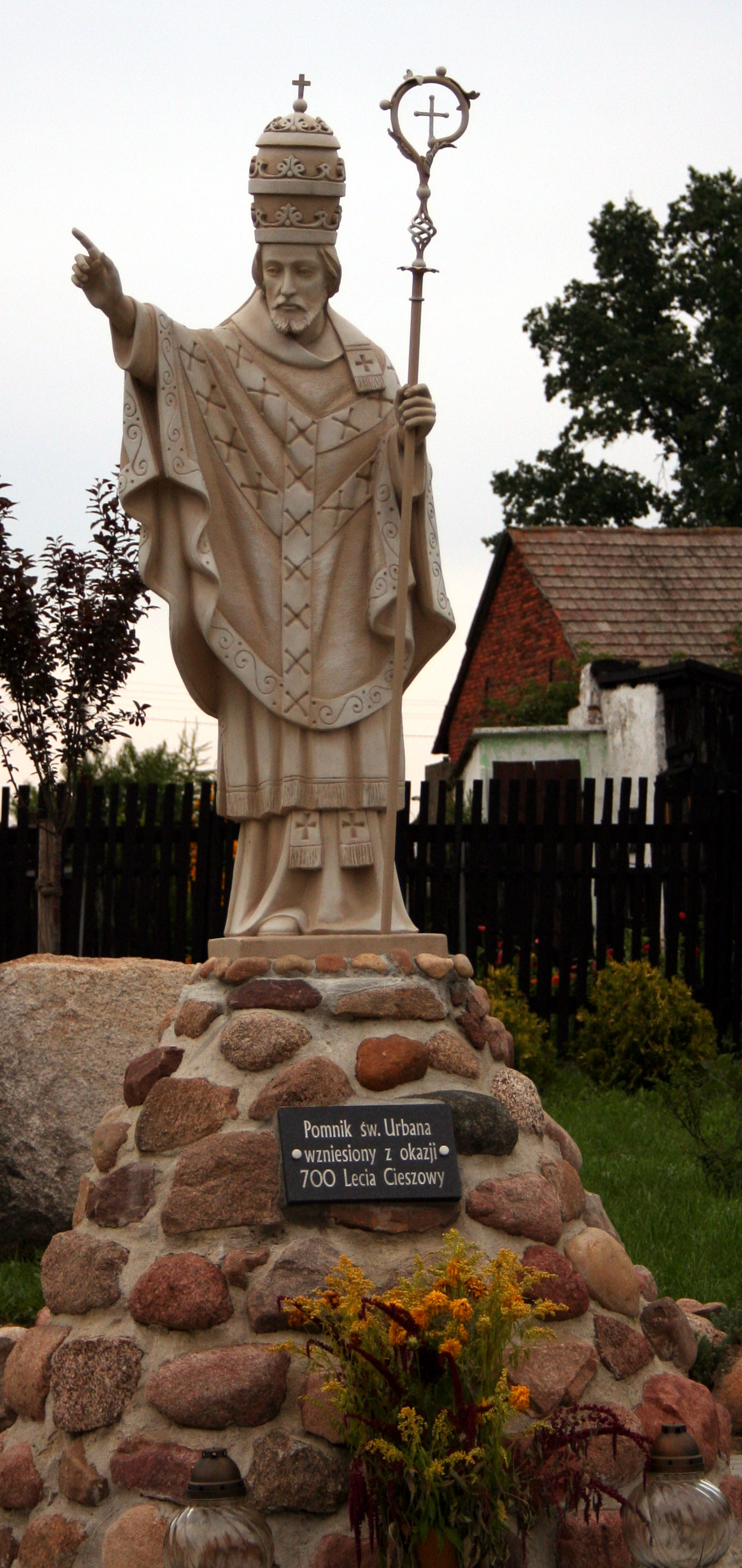
An anachronistic depiction of Urban wearing the papal tiara

Urban is found in various pieces of artwork usually in one of two forms. He is often found sitting wearing the papal tiara, papal robes and holding a sword pointed towards the ground. Otherwise, he may be portrayed wearing papal garb and a bishop's mitre while he holds a Bible and a bunch of grapes. An image of Urban is on a 12th-century fresco at Chalivoy-Milon in the Berry Art Gallery.

Other less common depictions of Pope Urban are:

- after his beheading, with the papal tiara near him.
- as idols fall from a column while he is beheaded;
- scourged at the stake;
- seated in a landscape as a young man (Saint Valerian) kneels before him and a priest holds a book.

== See also ==
- List of Catholic saints
- List of popes

== Notes ==
Titles of the Great Christian Church
Preceded by Callixtus I	Bishop of Rome; 222–230	Succeeded by Pontian
