= Sadów =

- Village
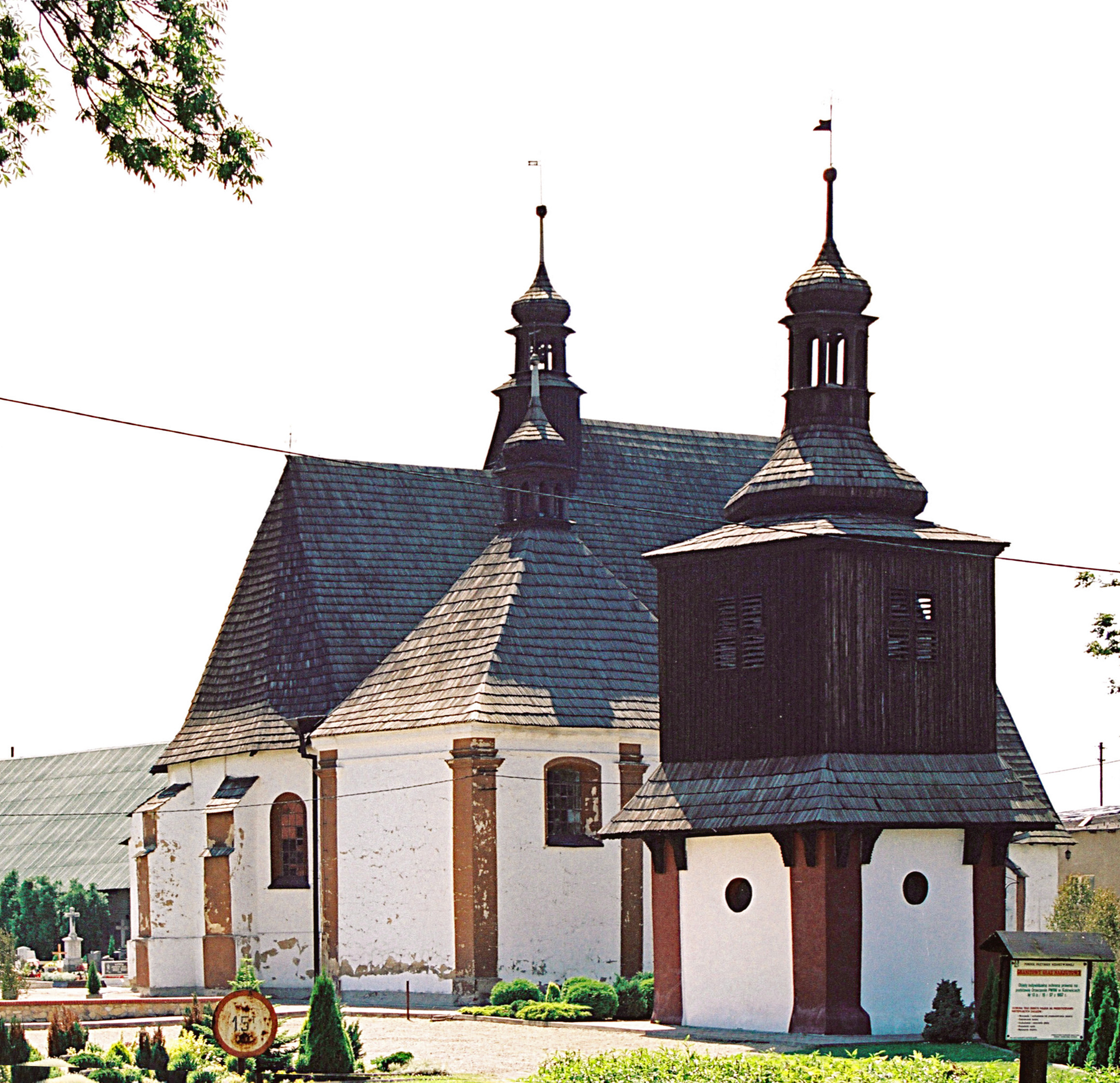
- Church of Saint Joseph before the renovation

- Location within Poland
- Coordinates: 50°40′N 18°44′E
- Country: Poland
- Voivodeship: Silesian
- County: Lubliniec
- Gmina: Koszęcin

Population
  - Total: 1,365
- Website: http://www.sadow.pl

Sadów [ˈsaduf] is a village in the administrative district of Gmina Koszęcin, within Lubliniec County, Silesian Voivodeship, in southern Poland.
