= Wierzbie, Silesian Voivodeship =

Wierzbie
- Village
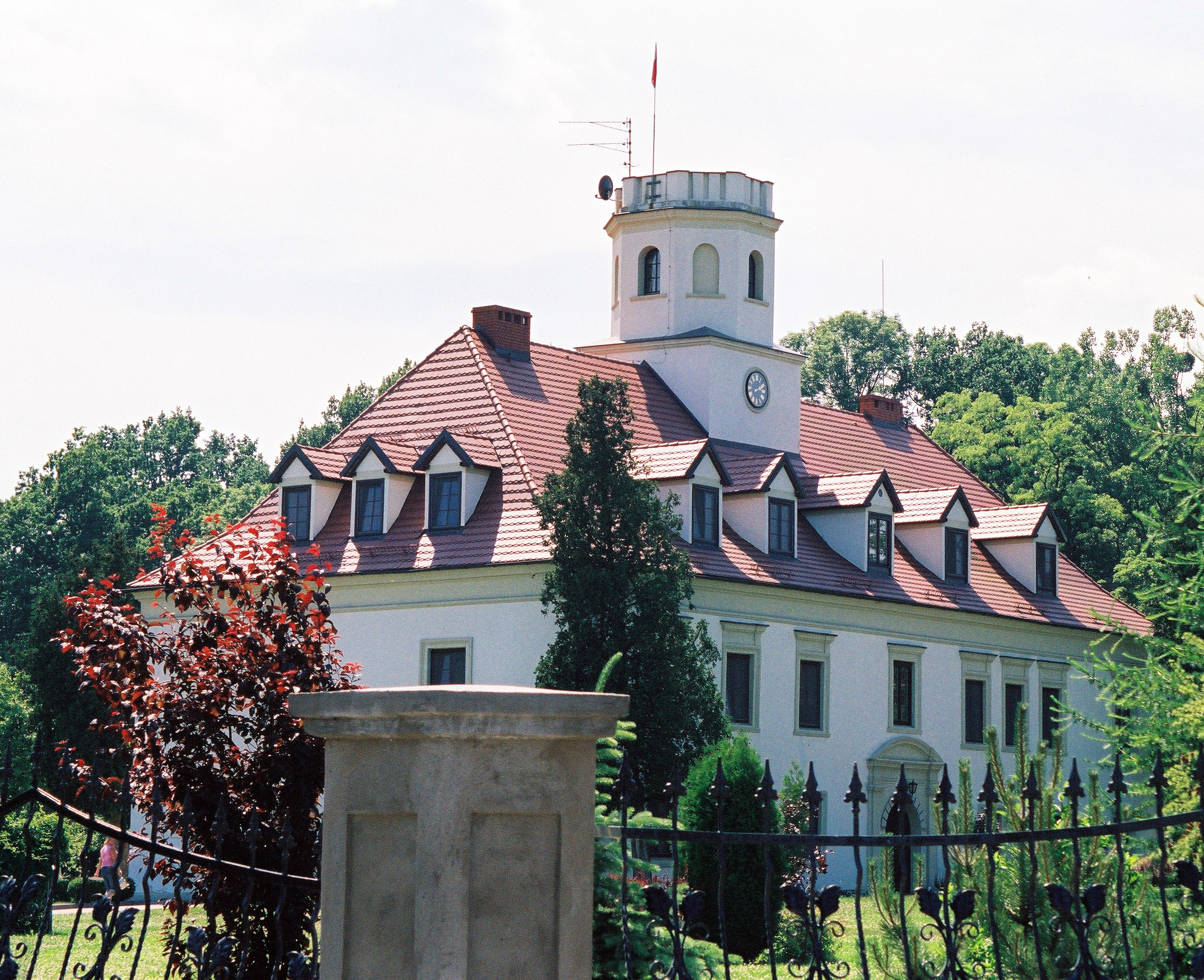
- Palace

- Location within Poland
- Coordinates: 50°39′N 18°46′E
- Country: Poland
- Voivodeship: Silesian
- County: Lubliniec
- Gmina: Koszęcin
- Population: 386

Wierzbie [ˈvjɛʐbjɛ] is a village in the administrative district of Gmina Koszęcin, within Lubliniec County, Silesian Voivodeship, in southern Poland.
