= Widzówek =

- Village
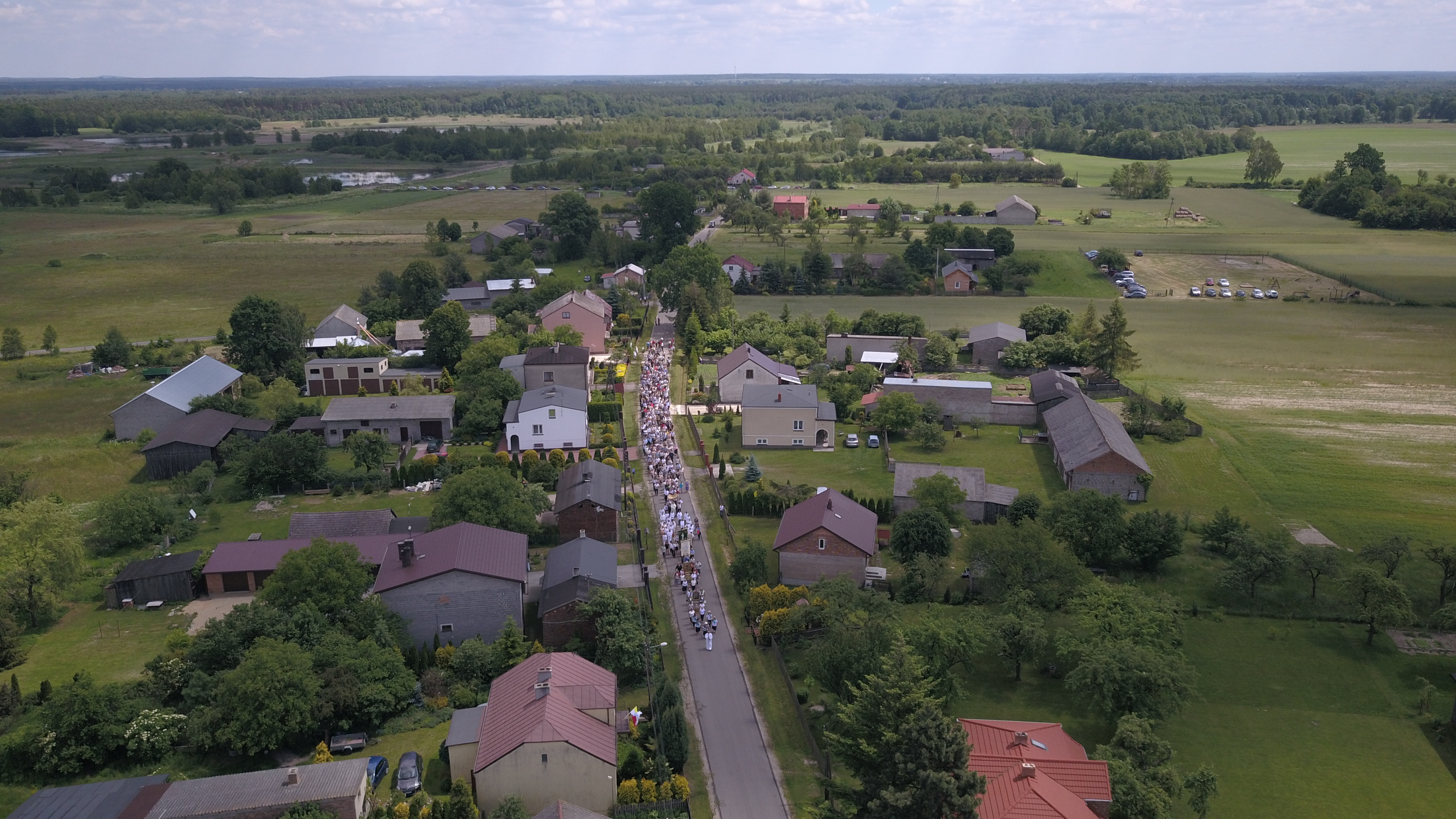

- Location within Poland
- Coordinates: 50°58′N 19°23′E
- Country: Poland
- Voivodeship: Silesian
- County: Częstochowa
- Gmina: Kruszyna
- Population: 188

Widzówek [viˈd͡zuvɛk] is a village in the administrative district of Gmina Kruszyna, within Częstochowa County, Silesian Voivodeship, in southern Poland.
