= Łazy, Lubliniec County =

Łazy
- Village
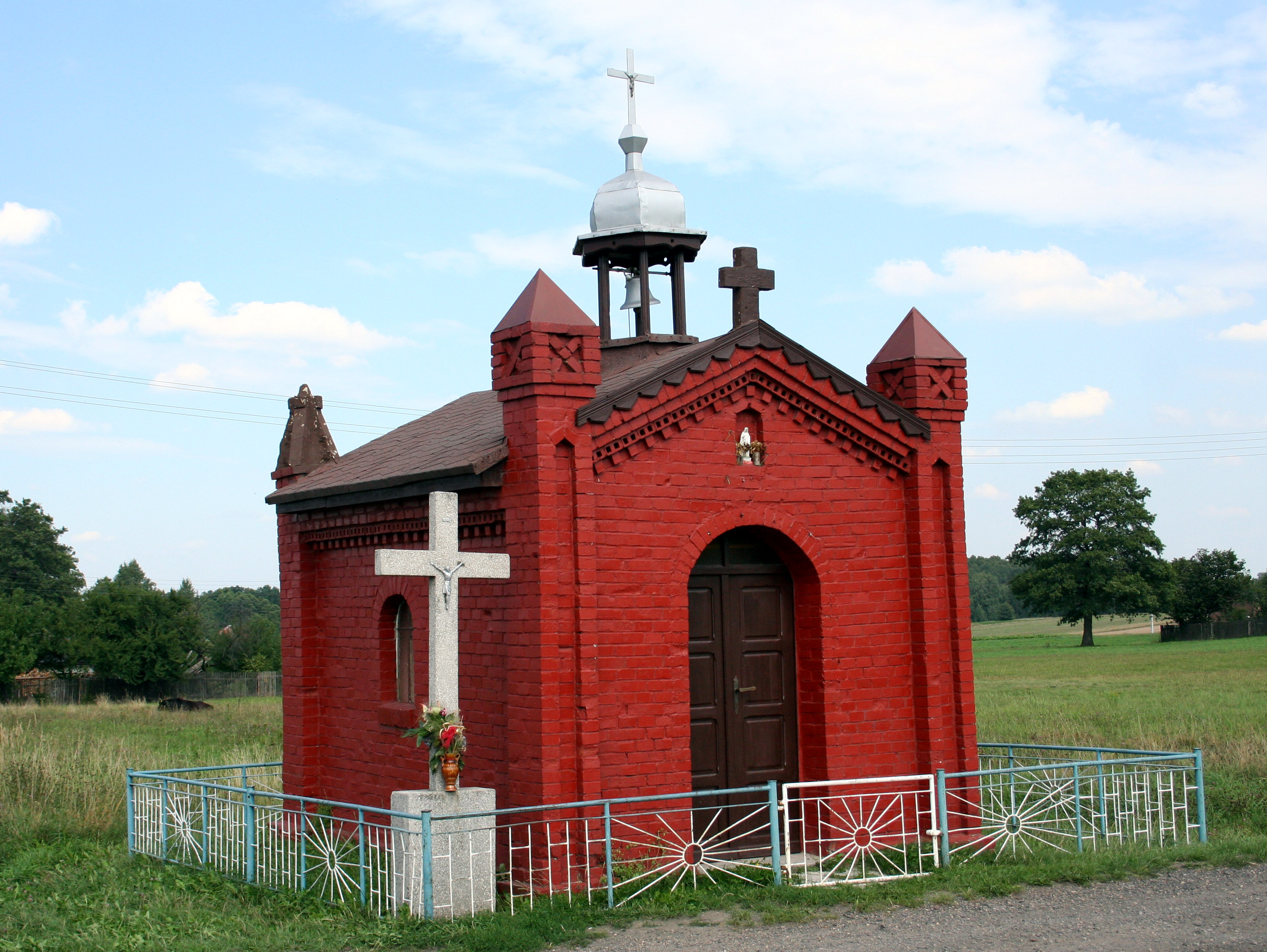
- Chapel

- Location within Poland
- Coordinates: 50°38′N 18°55′E
- Country: Poland
- Voivodeship: Silesian
- County: Lubliniec
- Gmina: Koszęcin
- Population: 156

Łazy [ˈwazɨ] is a village in the administrative district of Gmina Koszęcin, within Lubliniec County, Silesian Voivodeship, in southern Poland.
