= Łęg, Częstochowa County =

Łęg
- Village
- Location within Poland
- Coordinates: 51°1′N 19°18′E
- Country: Poland
- Voivodeship: Silesian
- County: Częstochowa
- Gmina: Kruszyna
- Population: 94

Łęg [wɛnk] is a village in the administrative district of Gmina Kruszyna, within Częstochowa County, Silesian Voivodeship, in southern Poland.
