= Lipowiec, Silesian Voivodeship =

Lipowiec
- Village
- Location within Poland
- Coordinates: 50°37′33″N 18°54′38″E
- Country: Poland
- Voivodeship: Silesian
- County: Lubliniec
- Gmina: Koszęcin
- Population: 4

Lipowiec [liˈpɔvjɛt͡s] is a village in the administrative district of Gmina Koszęcin, within Lubliniec County, Silesian Voivodeship, in southern Poland.
