= Rzyce =

- Village
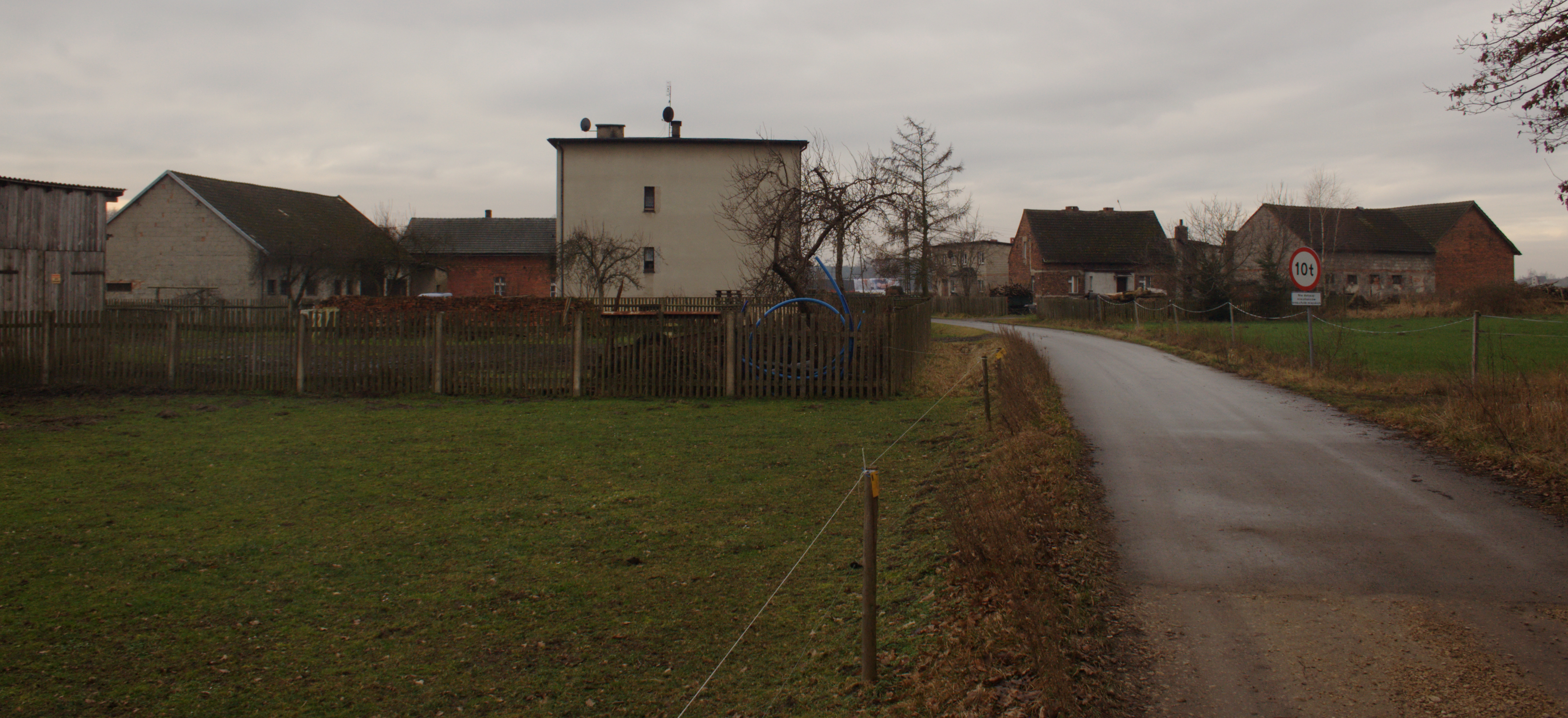

- Location within Poland
- Coordinates: 50°39′N 18°49′E
- Country: Poland
- Voivodeship: Silesian
- County: Lubliniec
- Gmina: Koszęcin
- Population: 28

Rzyce [ˈʐɨt͡sɛ] is a village in the administrative district of Gmina Koszęcin, within Lubliniec County, Silesian Voivodeship, in southern Poland.
