= Jacków, Silesian Voivodeship =

Jacków
- Village
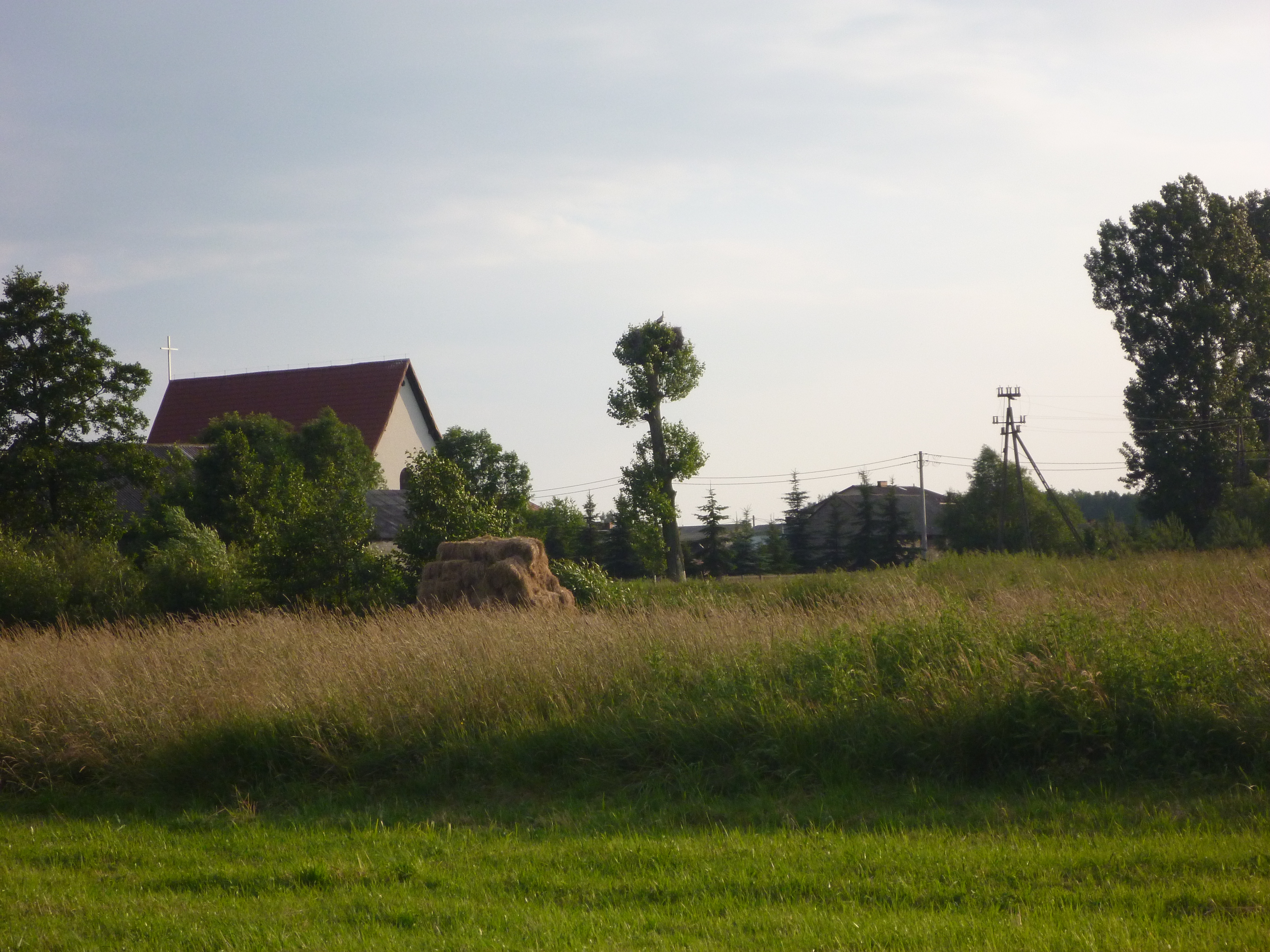

- Location within Poland
- Coordinates: 50°57′N 19°20′E
- Country: Poland
- Voivodeship: Silesian
- County: Częstochowa
- Gmina: Kruszyna
- Population: 572

Jacków [ˈjat͡skuf] is a village in the administrative district of Gmina Kruszyna, within Częstochowa County, Silesian Voivodeship, in southern Poland.
