= Gmina Koszęcin =

Gmina Koszęcin Koszęcin Commune
- Gmina
- Flag Coat of arms
- Interactive map of Gmina Koszęcin
- Coordinates (Koszęcin): 50°38′N 18°50′E
- Country: Poland
- Voivodeship: Silesian
- County: Lubliniec
- Seat: Koszęcin

Area
  - Total: 129 km^{2} (50 sq mi)

Population (2019-06-30)
  - Total: 11,842
  - Density: 91.8/km^{2} (238/sq mi)
- Website: https://www.koszecin.pl/

Gmina Koszęcin is a rural gmina (administrative district) in Lubliniec County, Silesian Voivodeship, in southern Poland. Its seat is the village of Koszęcin, which lies approximately 12 kilometres (7 mi) south-east of Lubliniec and 45 km (28 mi) north of the regional capital Katowice.

The gmina covers an area of 129 square kilometres (49.8 sq mi), and as of 2019, its total population was 11,842.

The gmina contains part of the protected area called Upper Liswarta Forests Landscape Park.

== Villages ==
Gmina Koszęcin contains the villages and settlements of Brusiek, Bukowiec, Cieszowa, Dolnik, Irki, Koszęcin, Krywałd, Łazy, Lipowiec, Nowy Dwór, Piłka, Prądy, Rusinowice, Rzyce, Sadów, Strzebiń and Wierzbie.

== Neighbouring gminas ==
Gmina Koszęcin is bordered by the towns of Kalety and Lubliniec, and by the gminas of Boronów, Herby, Kochanowice, Tworóg and Woźniki.

== Twin towns – sister cities ==
Gmina Koszęcin is twinned with:

- Gura Humorului, Romania
- Kraubath an der Mur, Austria
