= Dolnik, Silesian Voivodeship =

Dolnik
- Settlement
- Location within Poland
- Coordinates: 50°38′N 18°49′E
- Country: Poland
- Voivodeship: Silesian
- County: Lubliniec
- Gmina: Koszęcin

Dolnik [ˈdɔlnik] is a settlement in the administrative district of Gmina Koszęcin, within Lubliniec County, Silesian Voivodeship, in southern Poland.
