= Kalina, Silesian Voivodeship =

Kalina
- Village
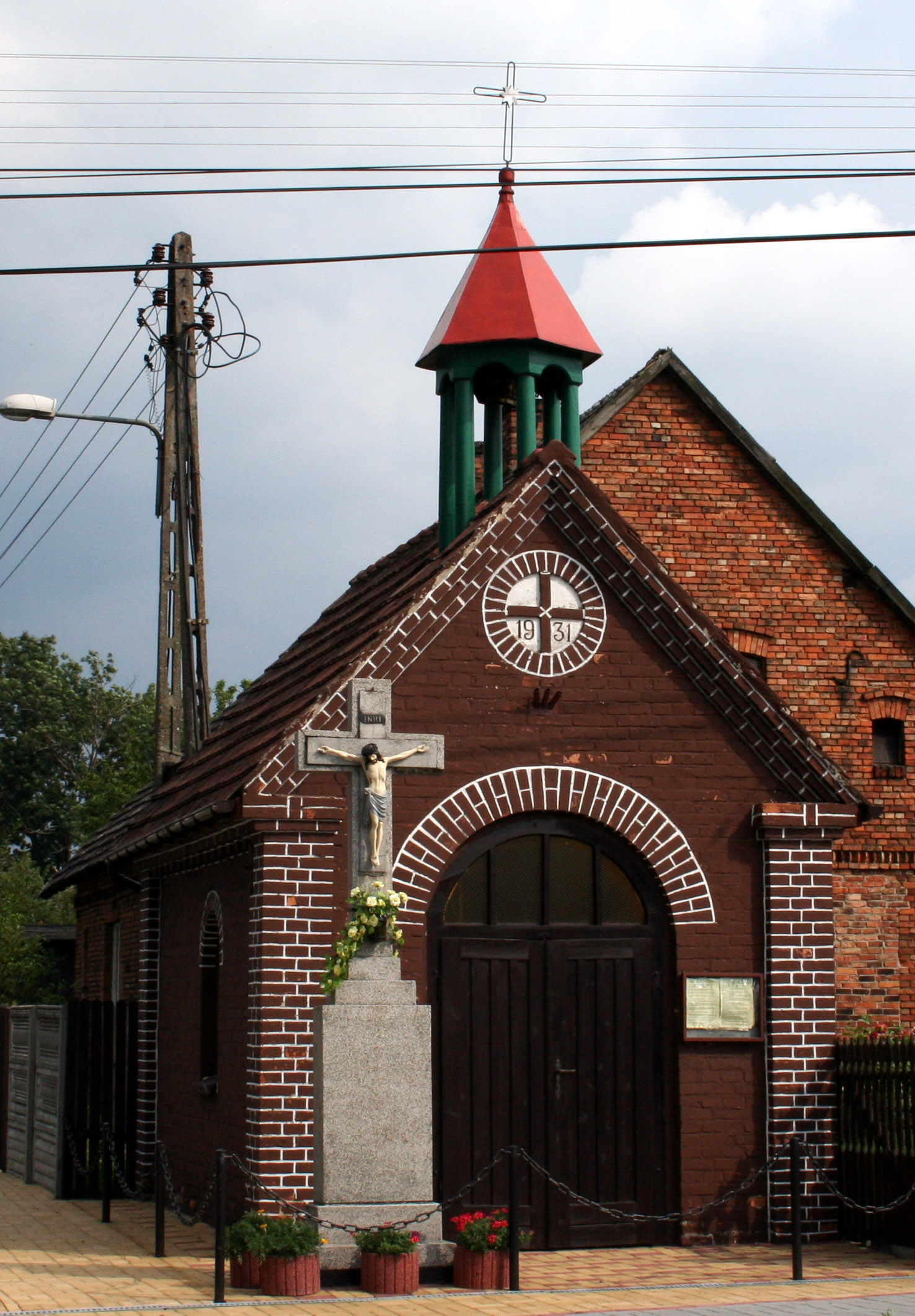
- Kalina Chapel.

- Location within Poland
- Coordinates: 50°43′N 18°52′E
- Country: Poland
- Voivodeship: Silesian
- County: Lubliniec
- Gmina: Herby
- Population: 381

Kalina [kaˈlina] is a village in the administrative district of Gmina Herby, within Lubliniec County, Silesian Voivodeship, in southern Poland.

== History ==
Kalina was previously a separate commune, and the town of Herby, today the seat of the commune, was part of the Kalina commune.

The village is administered by the Catholic Church and falls under the Olszyna parish

== Whirlwind ==
On August 15, 2008, around 5:24 p.m., a tornado passed over the town, damaging several dozen houses.

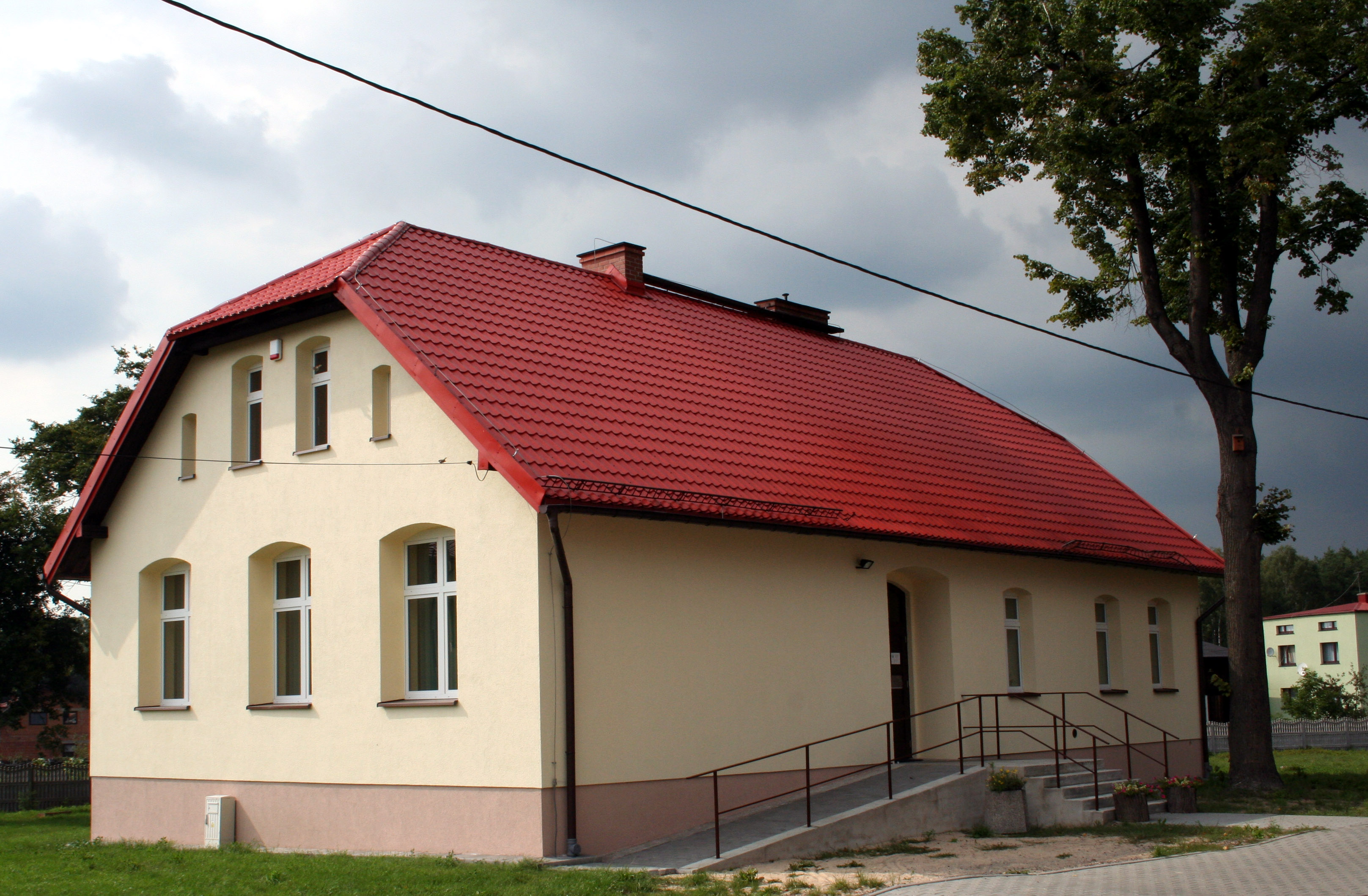
The site of Landscape Park "Lasy nad górną Liswartą

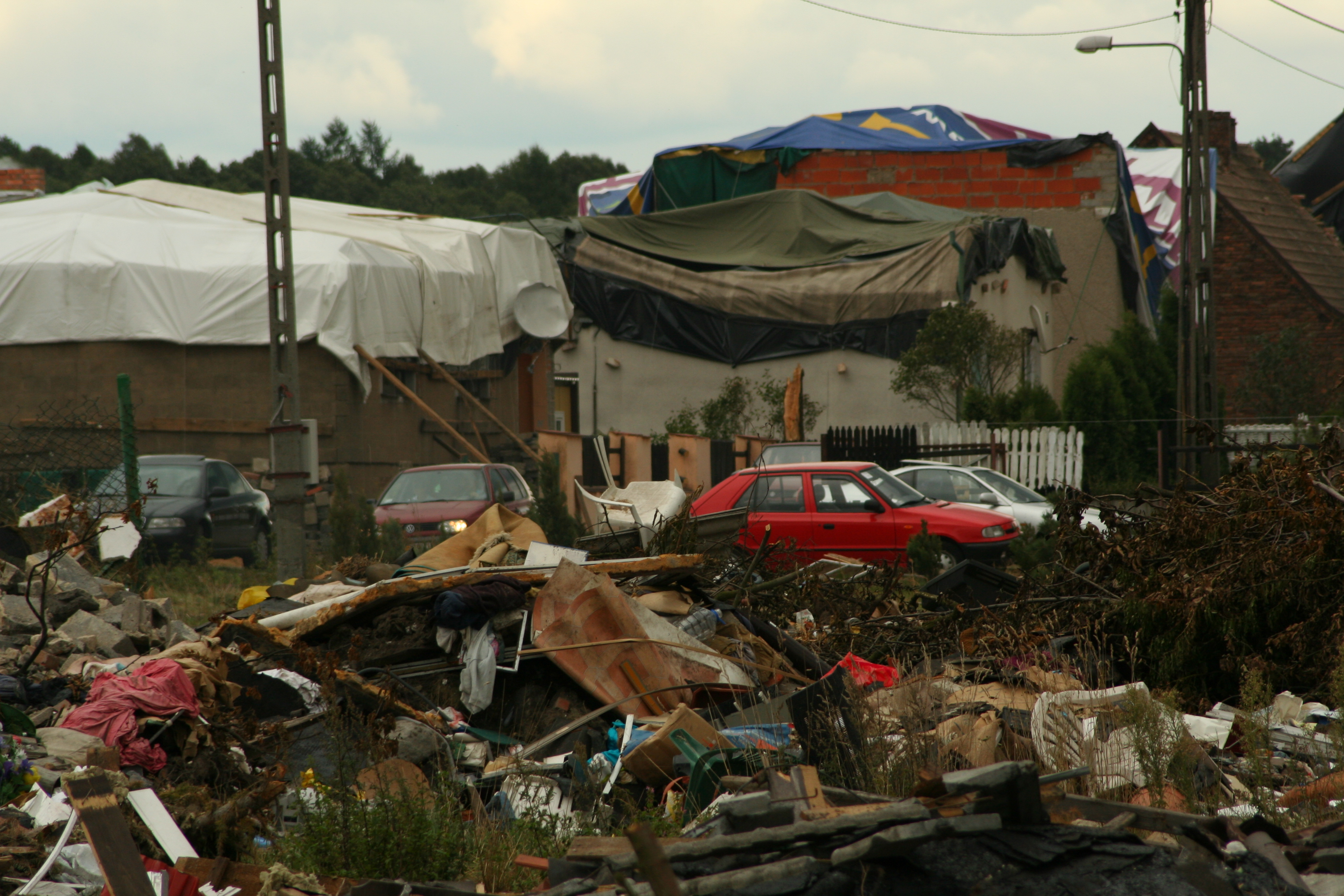
Village after disaster

== Transport ==
=== By car ===
You can drive through the village on DW 905

=== Public Transport ===
In the village, near the chapel, there is a bus stop which is rarely used anyway.
