= Lgota Mała =

- Village
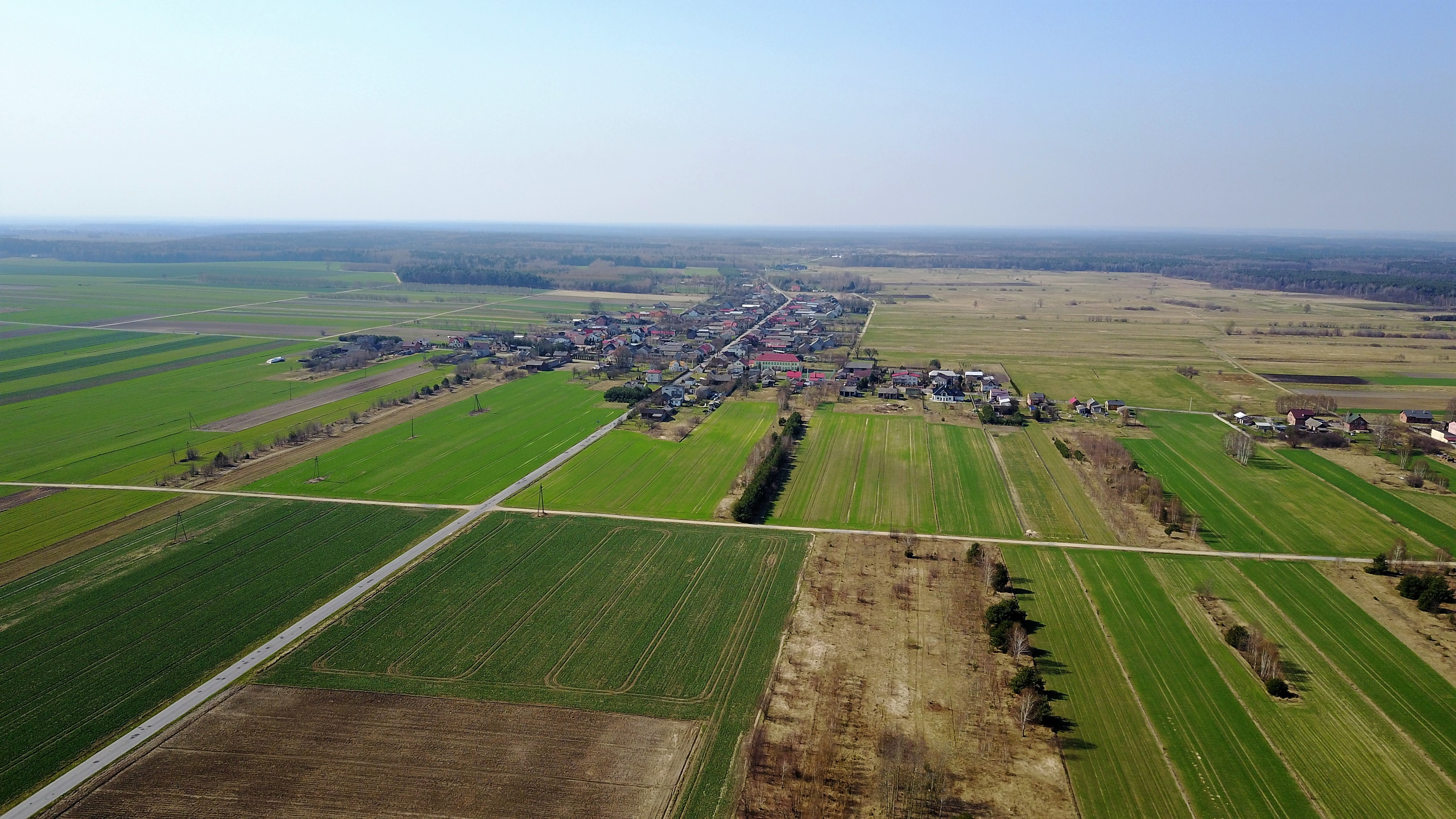

- Location within Poland
- Coordinates: 50°59′N 19°19′E
- Country: Poland
- Voivodeship: Silesian
- County: Częstochowa
- Gmina: Kruszyna
- Population: 579

Lgota Mała [ˈlɡɔta ˈmawa] is a village in the administrative district of Gmina Kruszyna, within Częstochowa County, Silesian Voivodeship, in southern Poland.
