= Teklinów, Silesian Voivodeship =

Teklinów
- Village
- Location within Poland
- Coordinates: 50°59′N 19°22′E
- Country: Poland
- Voivodeship: Silesian
- County: Częstochowa
- Gmina: Kruszyna
- Population: 361

Teklinów [tɛˈklinuf] is a village in the administrative district of Gmina Kruszyna, within Częstochowa County, Silesian Voivodeship, in southern Poland.
