= Prądy, Silesian Voivodeship =

Prądy
- Village
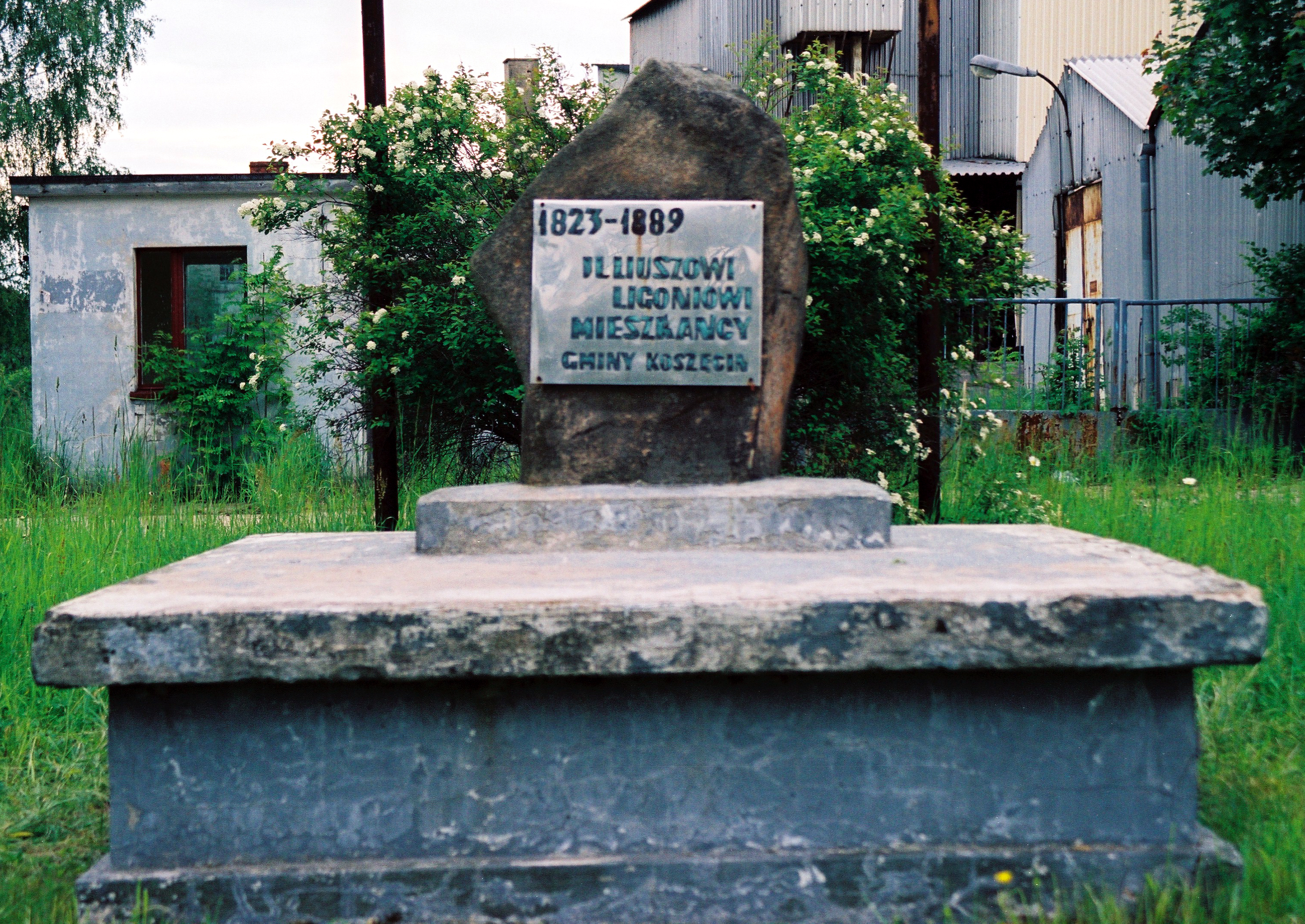
- Monument to Juliusz Ligoń

- Location within Poland
- Coordinates: 50°37′N 18°52′E
- Country: Poland
- Voivodeship: Silesian
- County: Lubliniec
- Gmina: Koszęcin
- Population: 167

Prądy [ˈprɔndɨ] is a village in the administrative district of Gmina Koszęcin, within Lubliniec County, Silesian Voivodeship, in southern Poland.
