= Kruszyna, Silesian Voivodeship =

Kruszyna
- Village
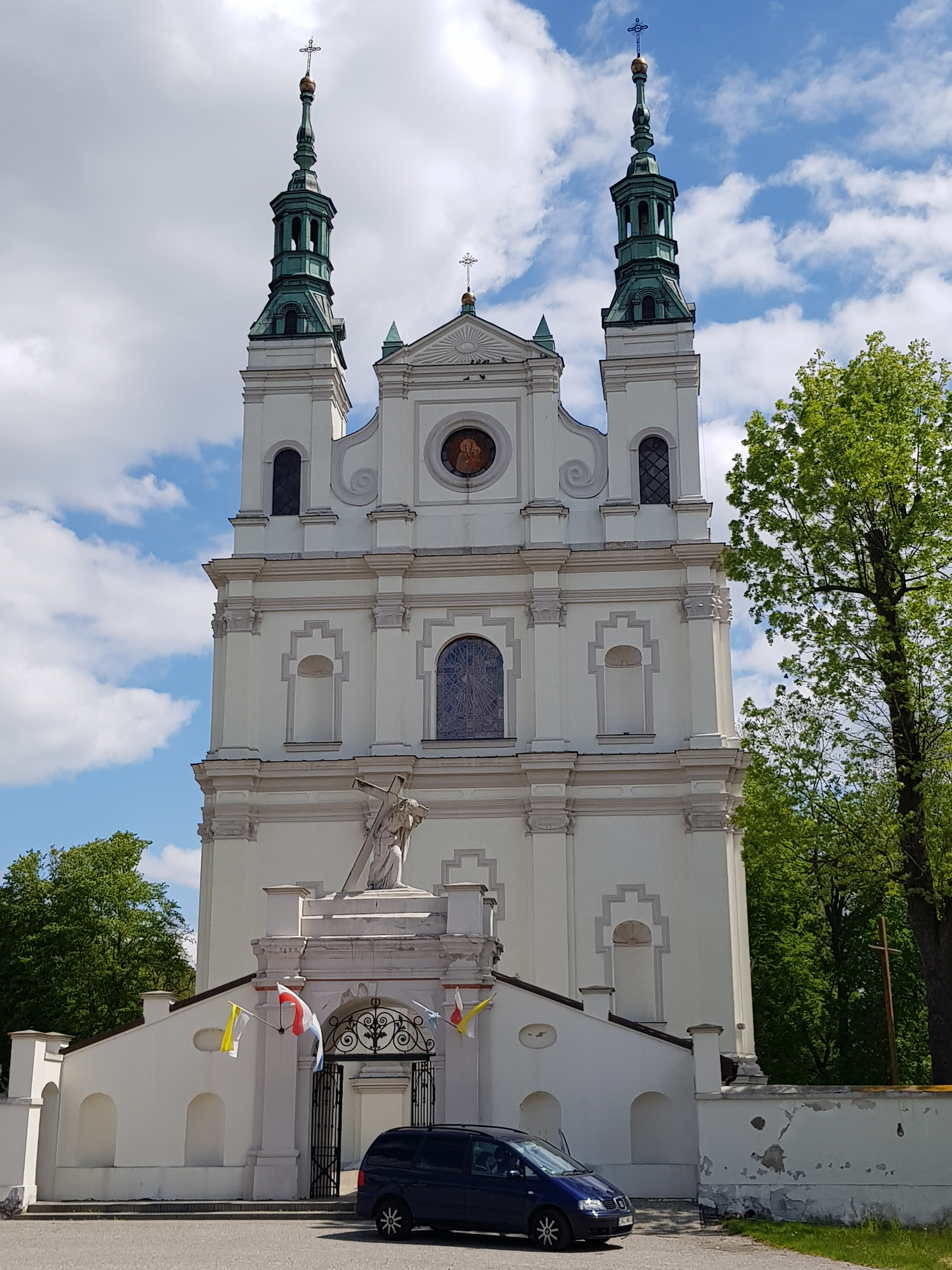
- Church of Saint Matthias

- Location within Poland
- Coordinates: 50°58′1″N 19°16′25″E
- Country: Poland
- Voivodeship: Silesian
- County: Częstochowa
- Gmina: Kruszyna
- First mentioned: 1337

Population
  - Total: 968
- Time zone: UTC+1 (CET)
  - Summer (DST): UTC+2 (CEST)
- Vehicle registration: SCZ

Kruszyna [kruˈʂɨna] is a village in Częstochowa County, Silesian Voivodeship, in southern Poland. It is the seat of the gmina (administrative district) called Gmina Kruszyna.

== History ==
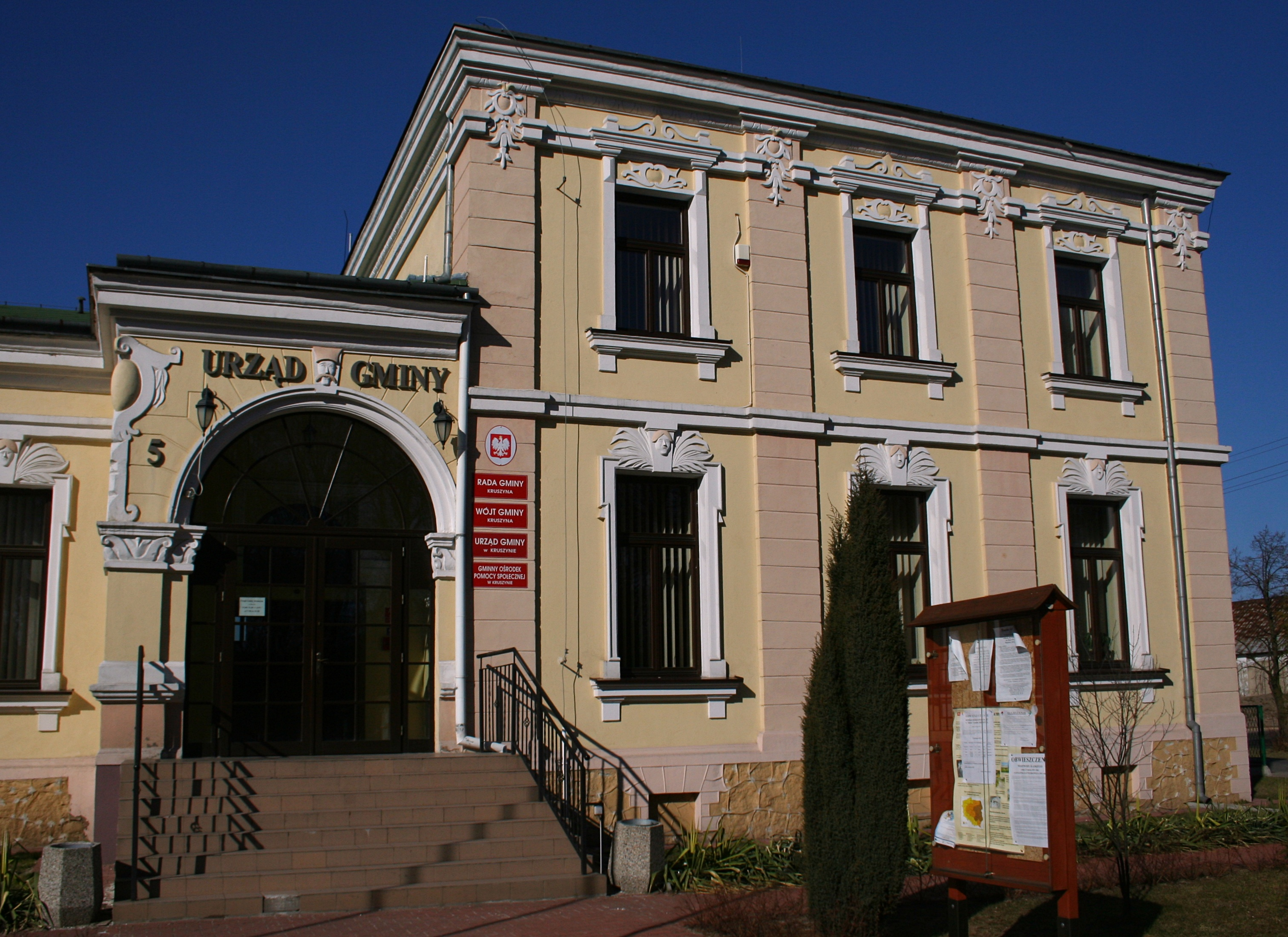
Gmina office

Kruszyna is one of the oldest villages of the region. It was first mentioned in 1337, as the seat of a Roman Catholic parish, with its own church. In the 16th and 17th centuries, the village belonged to the noble Koniecpolski family. In the early 17th century, it was property of Aleksandra Koniecpolska and her husband Kasper Doenhoff, a courtier of King Zygmunt III Waza, and Voivode of Dorpat Voivodeship. After annexation of northern Livonia by the Swedish Empire (1620s), Doenhoff left his native province and settled in Kruszyna. He was one of favourite courtiers of the king, who named him Voivode of Sieradz Voivodeship and Starosta of both Wieluń and Radomsko.

In 1630, Kasper Doenhoff commissioned Italian architect Tomasz Poncino to build a Renaissance palace, in which in 1633, the wedding of Denhoff's daughter took place. King Władysław IV Vasa visited Kruszyna several times. Furthermore, in February 1670, wedding reception of King Michał Korybut Wiśniowiecki and his wife Eleanor of Austria, Queen of Poland took place at the Kruszyna Palace. Later on, the palace passed to the Lubomirski family.

In the 19th century, the complex was remodelled. In 1827, the village had a population of 603.

On September 4, 1939, during the German invasion of Poland which started World War II, German troops carried out a massacre of dozens of Poles in the village (see Nazi crimes against the Polish nation).

After World War II, the palace for a while housed an orphanage. By 1980, it was abandoned and neglected, together with adjacent park.
