= Dąbrówka, Opole Voivodeship =

Dąbrówka Dombrowka
- Village
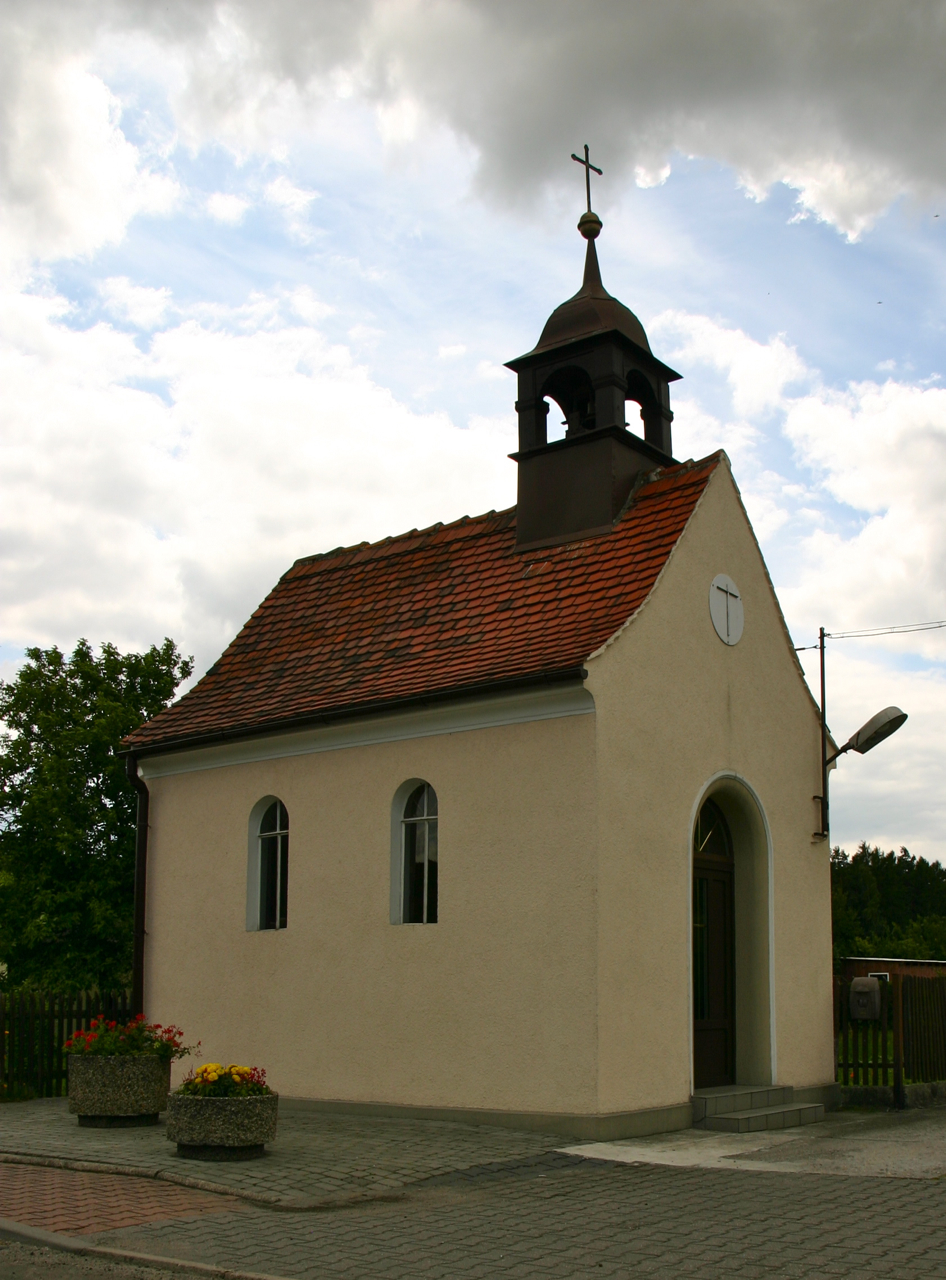

- Location within Poland
- Coordinates: 50°29′30″N 18°05′02″E
- Country: Poland
- Voivodeship: Opole
- County: Krapkowice
- Gmina: Gogolin
- Postal code: 47-330

Dąbrówka ([dɔmˈbrufka], additional name in German: Dombrowka) is a village in the administrative district of Gmina Gogolin, within Krapkowice County, Opole Voivodeship, in southern Poland.
