= Błotnica Strzelecka =

- Village
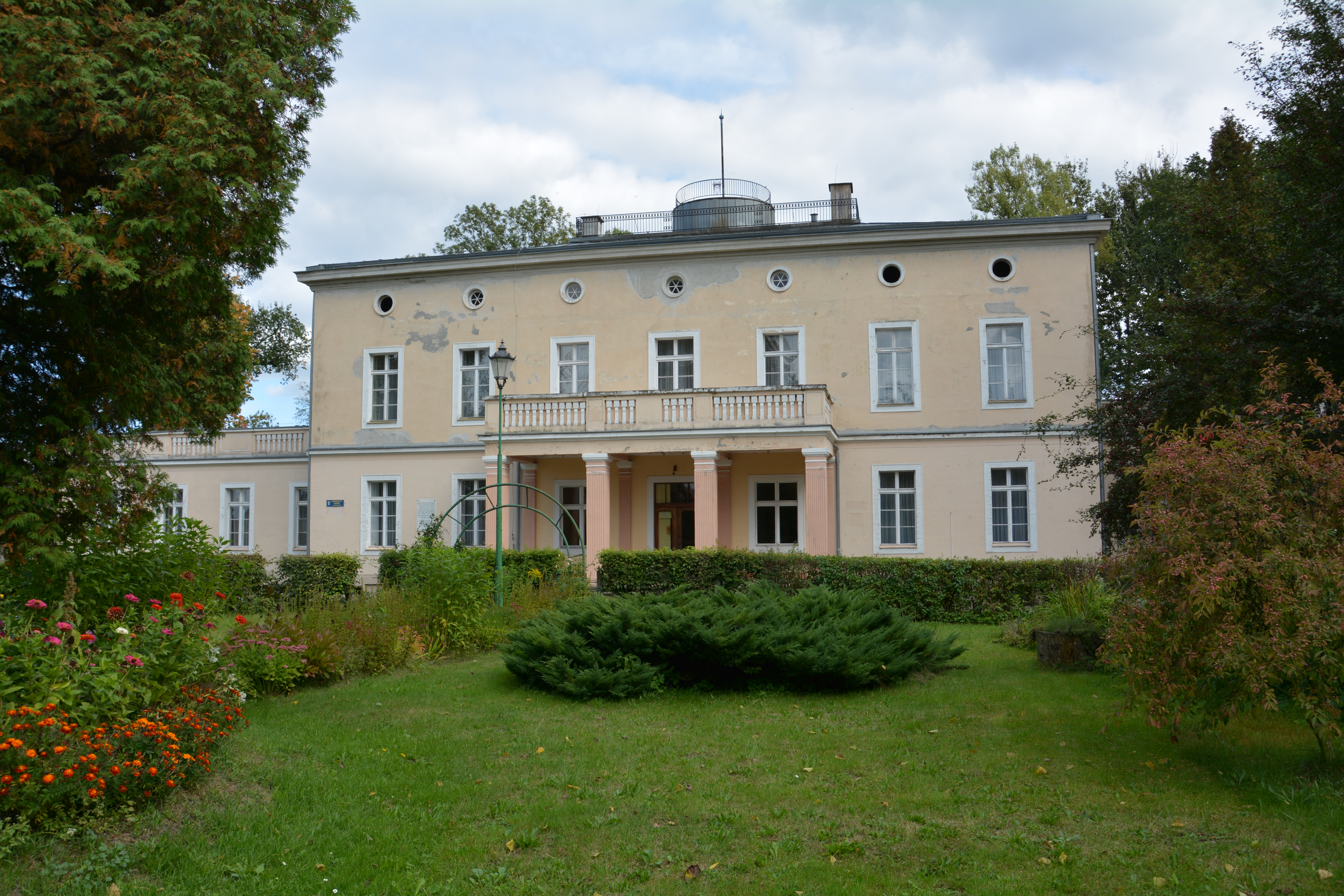
- Palace in Błotnica Strzelecka

- Location within Poland
- Coordinates: 50°29′19.7586″N 18°24′38.523″E
- Country: Poland
- Voivodeship: Opole
- County: Strzelce
- Gmina: Strzelce Opolskie
- Time zone: UTC+1 (CET)
  - Summer (DST): UTC+2 (CEST)
- Vehicle registration: OST

Błotnica Strzelecka [bwɔtˈnit͡sa stʂɛˈlɛt͡ska] (German: Blottnitz) is a village in the administrative district of Gmina Strzelce Opolskie, within Strzelce County, Opole Voivodeship, in southern Poland.

== History ==
In the 10th century the area became part of the emerging Polish state. The village was mentioned in the Liber fundationis episcopatus Vratislaviensis from around 1305, when it was part of fragmented Piast-ruled Poland. Later on, it was also part of Bohemia (Czechia), Prussia, and Germany. In 1936, during a massive Nazi campaign of renaming of placenames, it was renamed to Quellengrund to erase traces of Polish origin. During World War II, the Germans operated the E541 forced labour subcamp of the Stalag VIII-B/344 prisoner-of-war camp in the village. Following the defeat of Germany in the war, in 1945, the village became again part of Poland and its historic name was restored.

== Transport ==
There is a train station in Błotnica Strzelecka. The Polish National road 94 passes through Błotnica Strzelecka, and the A4 motorway runs nearby, south of the village.
