= Krywałd, Lubliniec County =

Krywałd
- Settlement
- Location within Poland
- Coordinates: 50°35′N 18°46′E
- Country: Poland
- Voivodeship: Silesian
- County: Lubliniec
- Gmina: Koszęcin

Krywałd [ˈkrɨvau̯t] is a settlement in the administrative district of Gmina Koszęcin, within Lubliniec County, Silesian Voivodeship, in southern Poland.
