= Piłka, Gmina Koszęcin =

Piłka
- Village
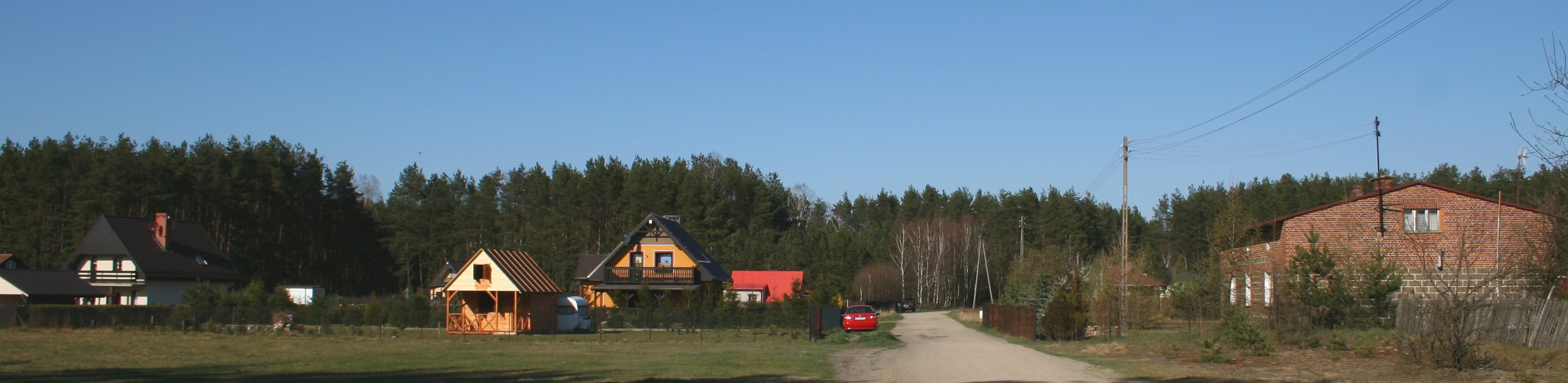

- Location within Poland
- Coordinates: 50°37′N 18°45′E
- Country: Poland
- Voivodeship: Silesian
- County: Lubliniec
- Gmina: Koszęcin
- Population: 75

Piłka [ˈpiu̯ka] is a village in the administrative district of Gmina Koszęcin, within Lubliniec County, Silesian Voivodeship, in southern Poland.
