= Kolonia Jaryszów =

- Village
- Location within Poland
- Coordinates: 50°26′20″N 18°20′34″E
- Country: Poland
- Voivodeship: Opole
- County: Strzelce
- Gmina: Ujazd

Kolonia Jaryszów [kɔˈlɔɲa jaˈrɨʂuf] (German: Kolonie Jarischau) is a village in the administrative district of Gmina Ujazd, within Strzelce County, Opole Voivodeship, in south-western Poland.
