= Balcarzowice =

Balcarzowice Balzarowitz
- Village
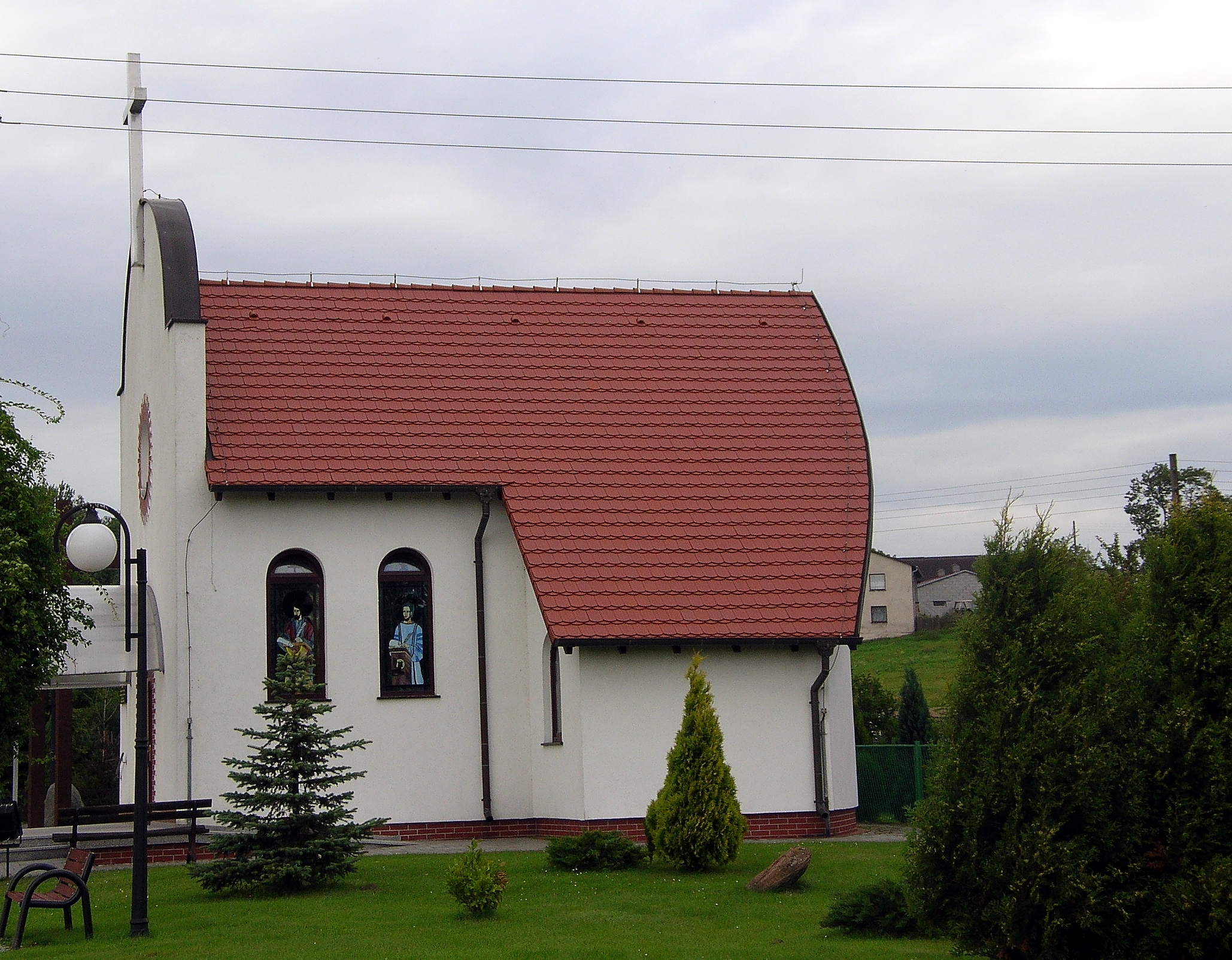
- Saint Christopher Church

- Location within Poland
- Coordinates: 50°28′N 18°22′E
- Country: Poland
- Voivodeship: Opole
- County: Strzelce
- Gmina: Ujazd
- Population (approx.): 250
- Time zone: UTC+1 (CET)
  - Summer (DST): UTC+2 (CEST)
- Vehicle registration: OST

Balcarzowice ([balt͡saʐɔˈvit͡sɛ], additional name in German: Balzarowitz) is a village in the administrative district of Gmina Ujazd, within Strzelce County, Opole Voivodeship, in southern Poland.
