= Rusinowice =

- Village
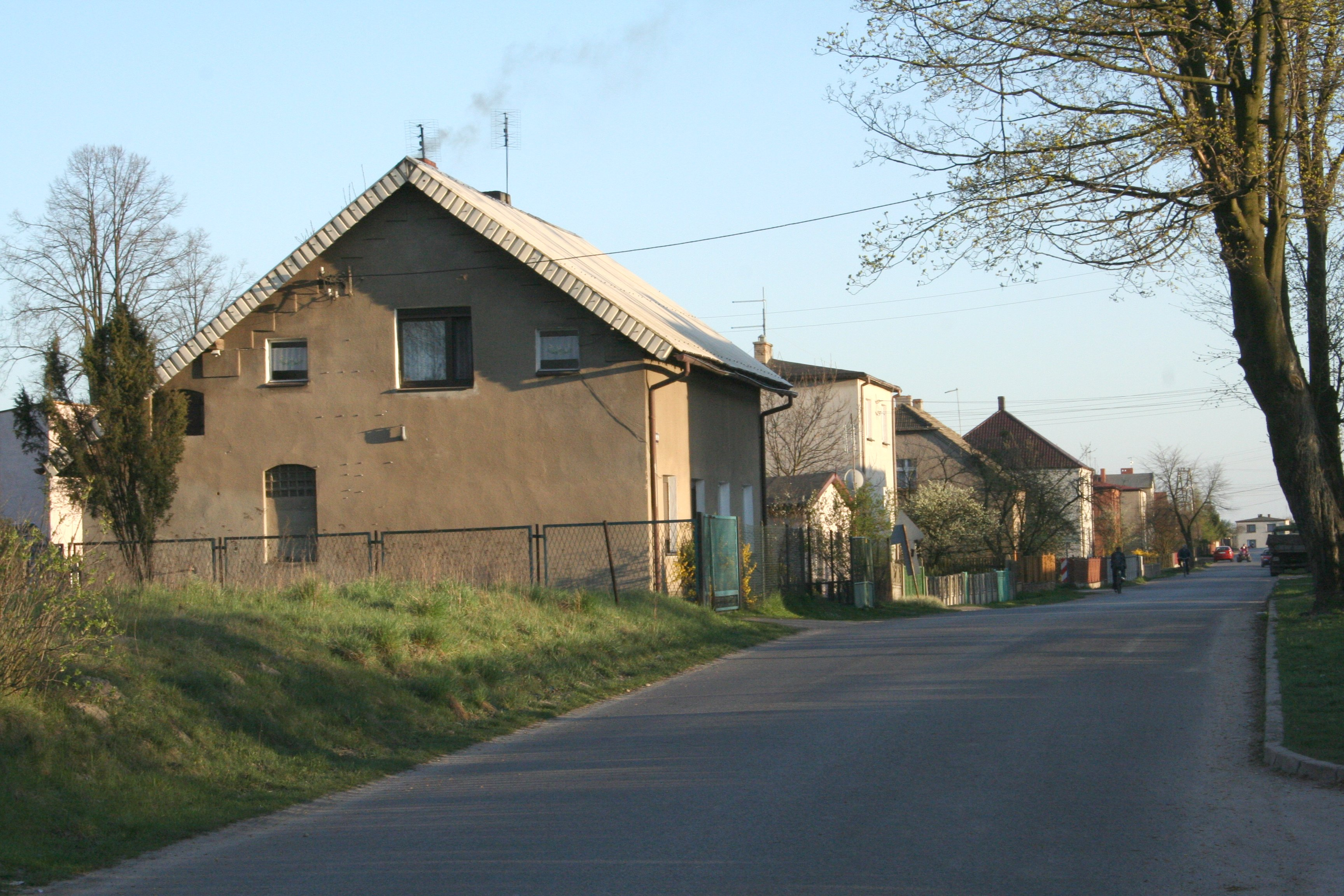

- Location within Poland
- Coordinates: 50°38′N 18°45′E
- Country: Poland
- Voivodeship: Silesian
- County: Lubliniec
- Gmina: Koszęcin
- Population: 1,336
- Postal code: 42-700

Rusinowice [ruɕinɔˈvit͡sɛ] (German Ruschinowitz) is a village in the administrative district of Gmina Koszęcin, within Lubliniec County, Silesian Voivodeship, in southern Poland. The village is located near to the Polish nature reserve Jeleniak Mikuliny.

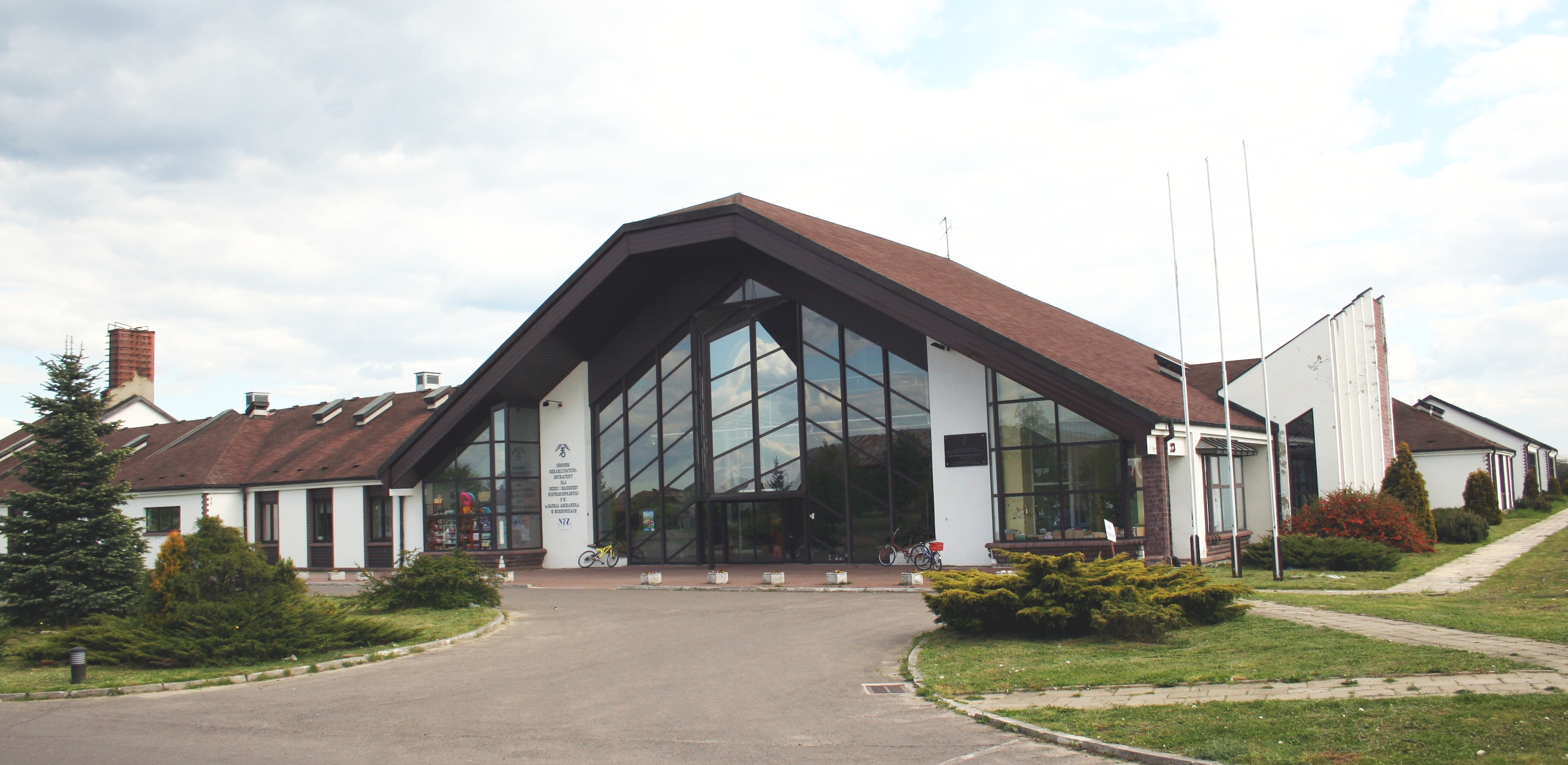
The Rehabilitation and Education Centre for disabled children and adolescents, located in Rusinowice.

Rusinowice has a centre of rehabilitation and education for disabled children and adolescents. The institution started operating in 1994. It was established through an initiative by the Polish Episcopate and the American Embassy in Poland. The centre is run by the Gliwice branch of Caritas.

== Monuments ==
The Church of the Discovery of the Holy Cross and St. Catherine is a Catholic church located in the village. Rusinowice and Piłka, a nearby village, both belong to a parish founded in 1985.

A volunteer fire department can also be found in Rusinowice. The department's one station has an observation tower and a firetruck.

== Trivia ==
- In August 2008, a whirlwind passed through the village, destroying or damaging many homes and farm buildings.
- In the Latin book Liber fundationis episcopatus Vratislaviensis (en. Book of endowments of the Bishopric of Wrocław) written in ca.1300, Rusinowice is mentioned in the Germanized form, Rusendorf.
