= Liswarta =

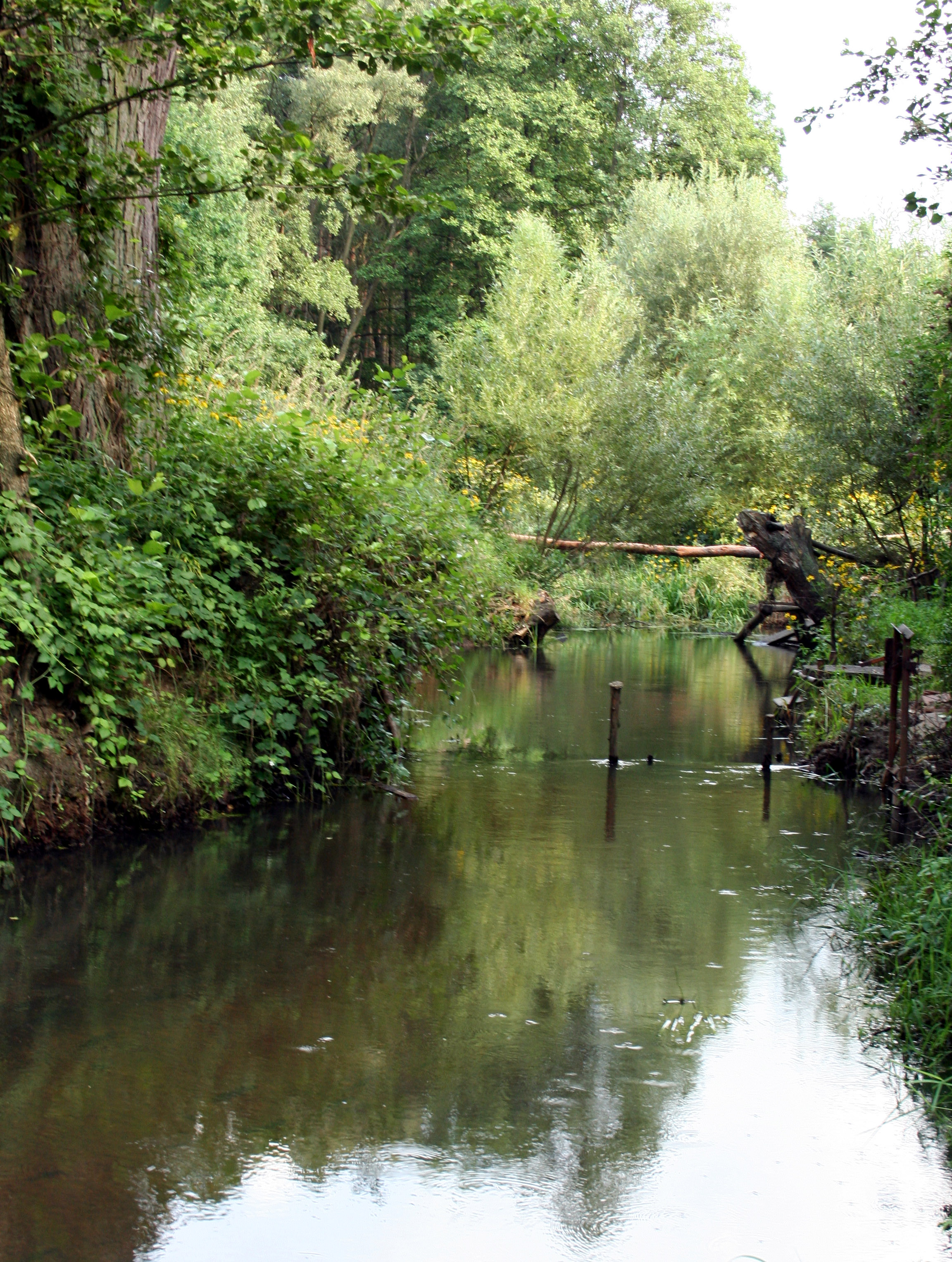
- Liswarta near Lisów

Physical characteristics
- Source
  - location: Mzyki
- Mouth
  - location: Warta
  - coordinates: 51°02′50″N 19°02′09″E
- Length: 93 km (58 mi)
- Basin size: 1,558 km^{2} (602 sq mi)

Basin features
- Progression: Warta→ Oder→ Baltic Sea

The Liswarta is a river in south-central Poland, a left tributary of the Warta river. The Liswarta has a length of 93 km and a basin area of 1,558 km^{2}. Its largest tributaries are the Biała Oksza, Bieszcza, Górnianka, Łomnica, Pańkówka, Piskara, and Potok Jeżowski.

== Towns and villages ==
- Gmina Woźniki
  - Mzyki
- Gmina Boronów
  - Grojec
  - Boronów
- Gmina Herby
  - Hadra
  - Lisów
  - Tanina
  - Łebki
- Gmina Krzepice
  - Lutrowskie
  - Krzepice
- Gmina Lipie
  - Danków
  - Szyszków
- Gmina Popów
  - Zawady
