= Herby Nowe railway station =

Railway station in Herby, Poland

Herby Nowe
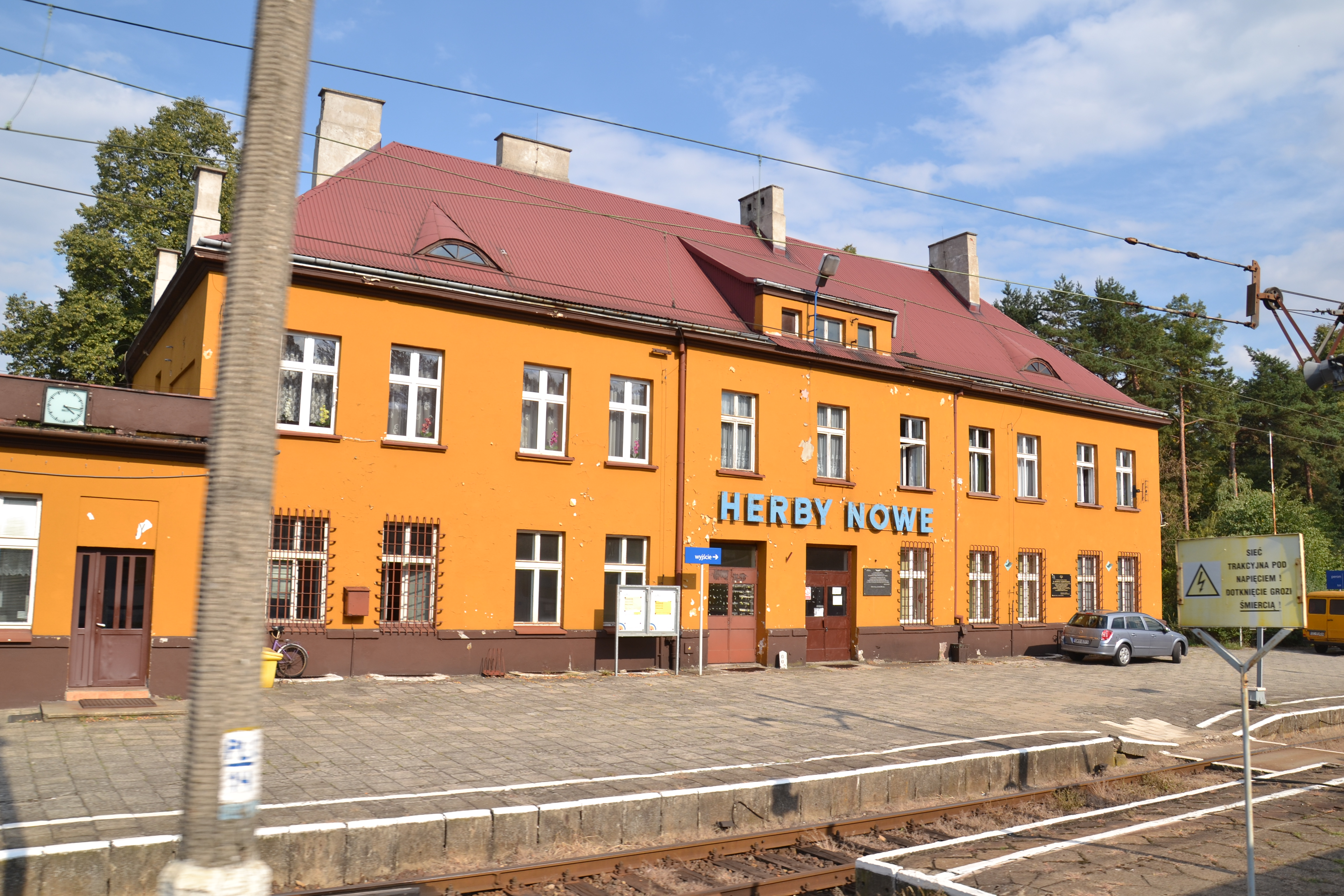
- Station building at Herby Nowe in 2015

General information
- Location: Herby; Silesian Voivodeship; Poland
- Coordinates: 50°44′54″N 18°51′16″E
- System: Railway Station
- Lines: 131: Chorzów Batory–Tczew; 181: Herby Nowe–Oleśnica; 686: Herby Nowe–Liswarta; 704: Herby Nowe–Herby Stare
- Platforms: 6
- Tracks: 6

History
- Opened: 1926
Location
- Location within Silesian Voivodeship Location within Poland Location within Europe

Herby Nowe is a railway station serving the town of Herby, located north of the Upper Silesian Industrial Area, along the Polish Coal Trunk-Line, in the Lubliniec County of the Silesian Voivodeship. By the station, which was opened in 1926, there is a whole district of condominiums and houses, built for the workers of the Polish State Railways and their families. Less than 2 kilometers southwest lies its twin station Herby Stare, located along the Częstochowa - Lubliniec line. Both stations are connected with each other, due to a big line, built in 1926.

== See also ==
- Gmina Herby
