= Herby Stare railway station =

Railway station in Herby, Poland

Herby Stare
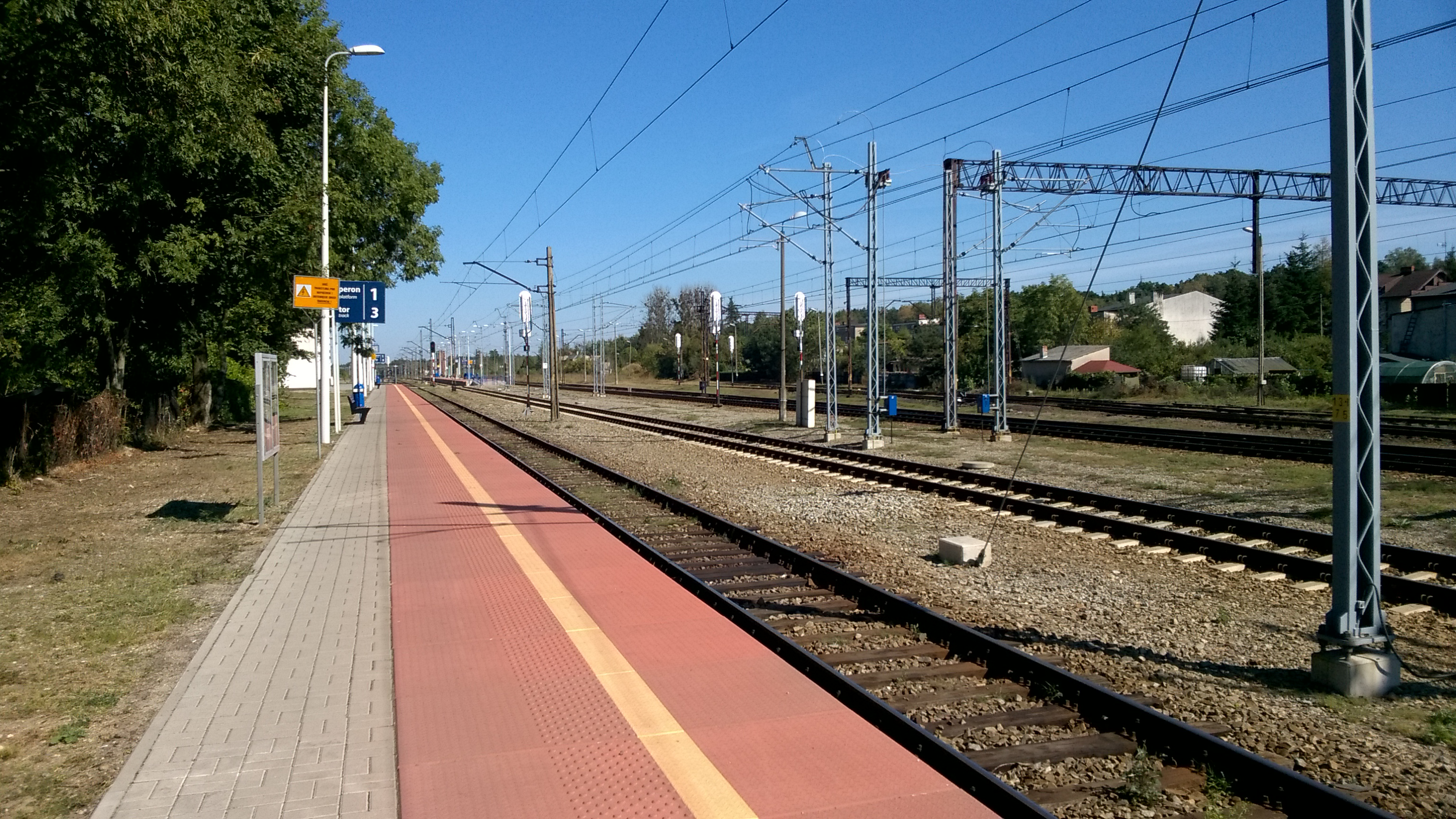
- Station building at Herby Stare in 2013

General information
- Location: Herby; Silesian Voivodeship; Poland
- Coordinates: 50°44′51″N 18°52′54″E
- System: Railway Station
- Line: 61: Kielce–Fosowskie 687: Kalina–Herby Stare 704: Herby Stare–Herby Nowe
- Platforms: 2
- Tracks: 3

Services
Preceding station	KŚ	Following station
Lisów towards Lubliniec	S13	Blachownia towards Częstochowa
Location
- Location within Silesian Voivodeship Location within Poland Location within Europe

Herby Stare is a Polish railway station, located north of the Upper Silesian Industrial Area, along the major Częstochowa - Lubliniec line, in the Lubliniec County of the Silesian Voivodeship. Less than 2 kilometres northeast lies its twin station Herby Nowe, located along the Polish Coal Trunk-Line line. Both stations are connected with each other by a line built in 1926.

== See also ==
- Gmina Herby
