= Andrzej Gawron =

Polish politician and deputy

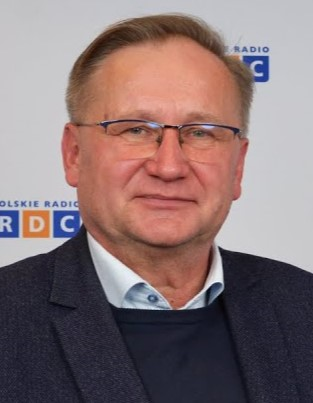

Sejm Member
- Incumbent
- Assumed office 2015

Personal details
- Born: 6 January 1965 (age 61) Kochcice
- Party: Law and Justice
- Occupation: Entrepreneur, politician

Andrzej Gawron (born January 6, 1965, in Kochcice) is a Polish politician, entrepreneur and local official.

== Biography ==
He graduated from electrical high school in Kalety. He ran his own business in the telecommunications industry.

From 1998 to 2002, he was a councilor of the Lubliniec County. In 2011, he joined Law and Justice and he took over the leadership of the local structures of this party. In the local elections in 2014 he unsuccessfully applied for a councilor seat to the Silesian Regional Assembly.

In the parliamentary elections in 2015, he was running for the Sejm from the fourth place from Law and Justice in the Częstochowa district. He obtained the mandate of the 8th term, receiving 9202 votes. In the elections in 2019, he was again a candidate to the Sejm from the Częstochowa district. He was elected, receiving 13,888 votes.
