= Olszyna, Silesian Voivodeship =

Olszyna
- Village
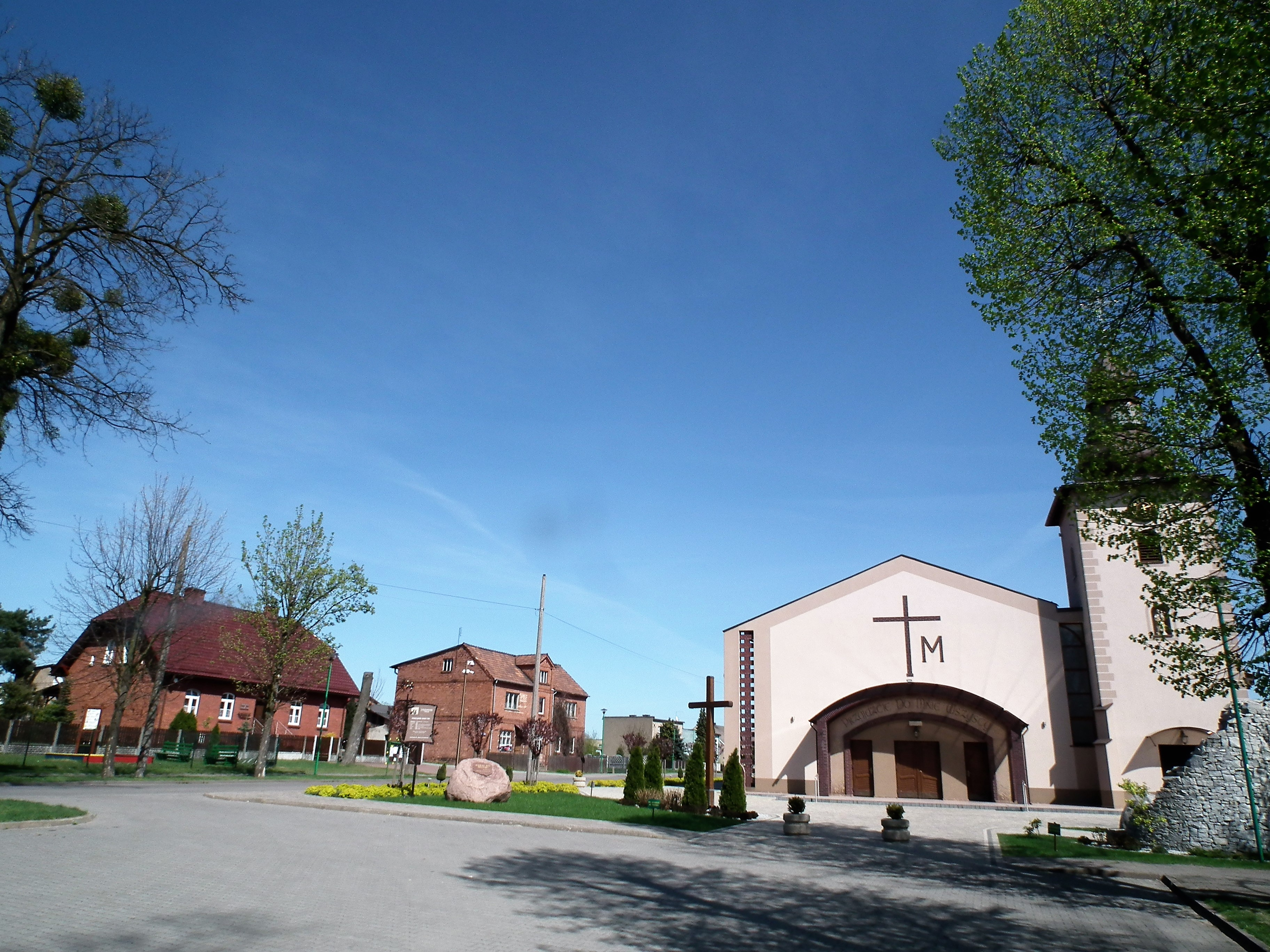

- Location within Poland
- Coordinates: 50°43′N 18°53′E
- Country: Poland
- Voivodeship: Silesian
- County: Lubliniec
- Gmina: Herby
- Population: 773
- Website: http://www.olszyna.info

Olszyna [ɔlˈʂɨna] is a village in the administrative district of Gmina Herby, within Lubliniec County, Silesian Voivodeship, in southern Poland.
