= Jeżowa =

- Village
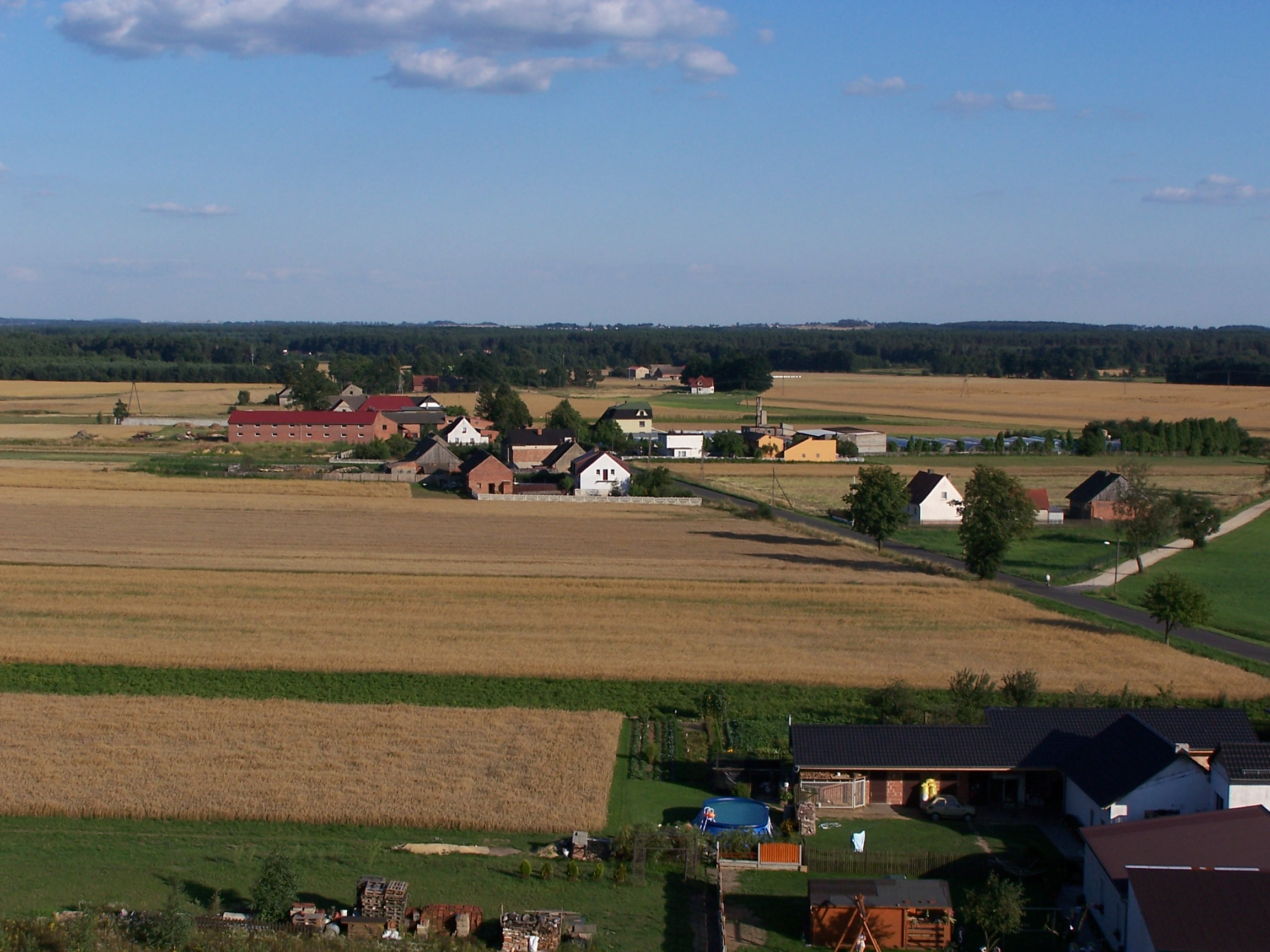

- Location within Poland
- Coordinates: 50°46′N 18°34′E
- Country: Poland
- Voivodeship: Silesian
- County: Lubliniec
- Gmina: Ciasna
- Elevation: 250 m (820 ft)
- Population: 550
- Time zone: UTC+1 (CET)
  - Summer (DST): UTC+2 (CEST)
- Vehicle registration: SLU
- Website: http://koscioljezowa.ugu.pl/

Jeżowa [jɛˈʐɔva] is a village in the administrative district of Gmina Ciasna, within Lubliniec County, Silesian Voivodeship, in southern Poland.

The name of the village is of Polish origin and comes from the word jeż, which means "hedgehog".
