= Pankówka =

Location
- Country: Poland
- Voivodeship: Silesian
- County (Powiat): Kłobuck

Physical characteristics
- Source
  - location: west of Węglowice, Gmina Wręczyca Wielka
  - coordinates: 50°48′26.8″N 18°49′59.2″E
- Mouth: Liswarta
  - location: southwest of Lutrowskie, Gmina Krzepice
  - coordinates: 50.9538°N 18.6774°E
- Length: 19 km (12 mi)
- Discharge
  - average: 0.5 m^{3}/s (18 cu ft/s) near the mouth

Basin features
- Progression: Liswarta→ Warta→ Oder→ Baltic Sea

The Pankówka is a river of Poland, a tributary of the Liswarta near Krzepice.
