= Dzielna, Silesian Voivodeship =

Dzielna
- Village
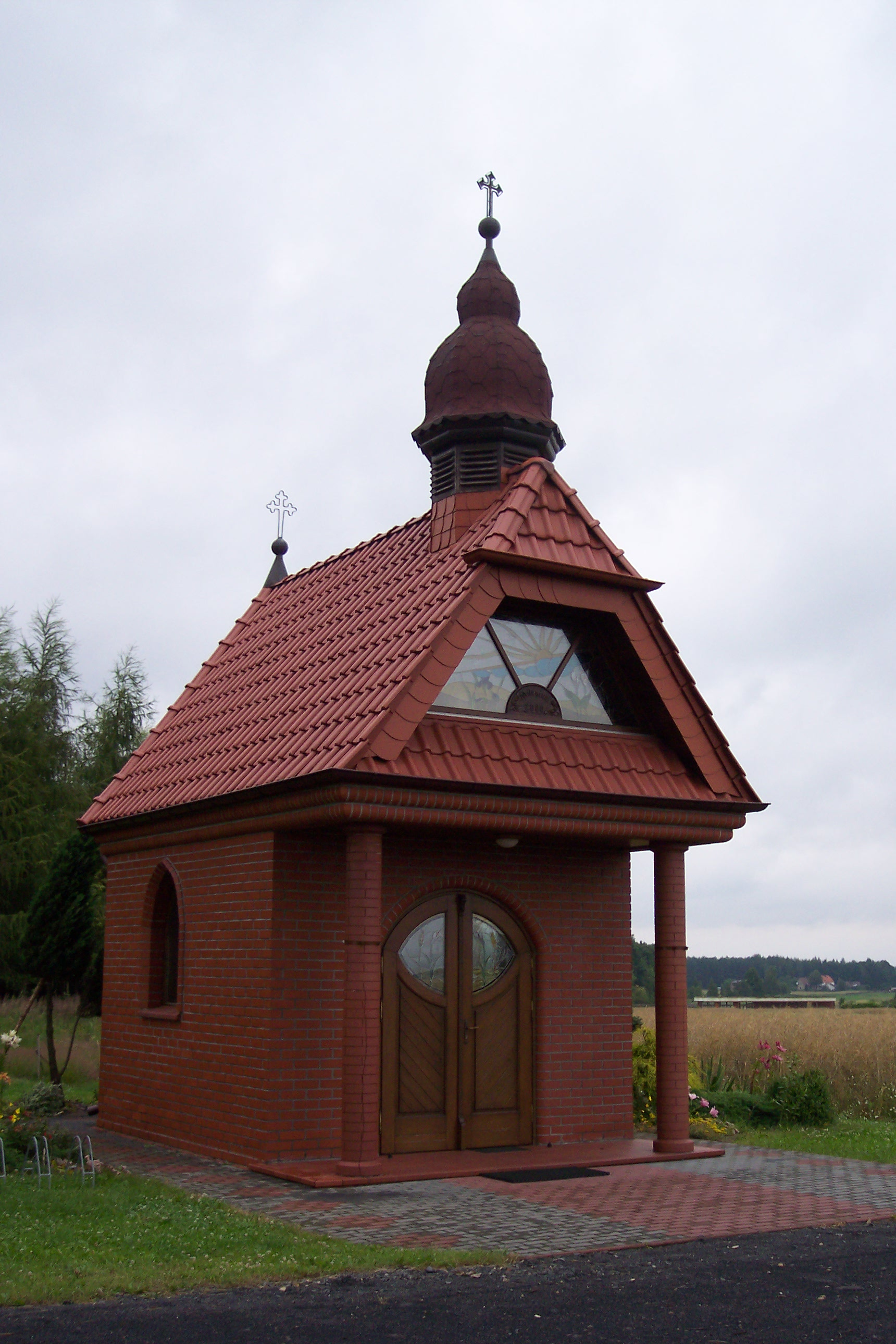
- Chapel

- Location within Poland
- Coordinates: 50°44′39″N 18°33′39″E
- Country: Poland
- Voivodeship: Silesian
- County: Lubliniec
- Gmina: Ciasna

Dzielna [ˈd͡ʑɛlna] is a village in the administrative district of Gmina Ciasna, within Lubliniec County, Silesian Voivodeship, in southern Poland.
