= Drapacz, Silesian Voivodeship =

Drapacz
- Settlement
- Location within Poland
- Coordinates: 50°43′N 18°50′E
- Country: Poland
- Voivodeship: Silesian
- County: Lubliniec
- Gmina: Herby
- Population: 9

Drapacz [ˈdrapat͡ʂ] is a settlement in the administrative district of Gmina Herby, within Lubliniec County, Silesian Voivodeship, in southern Poland.
