= Braszczok =

- Village
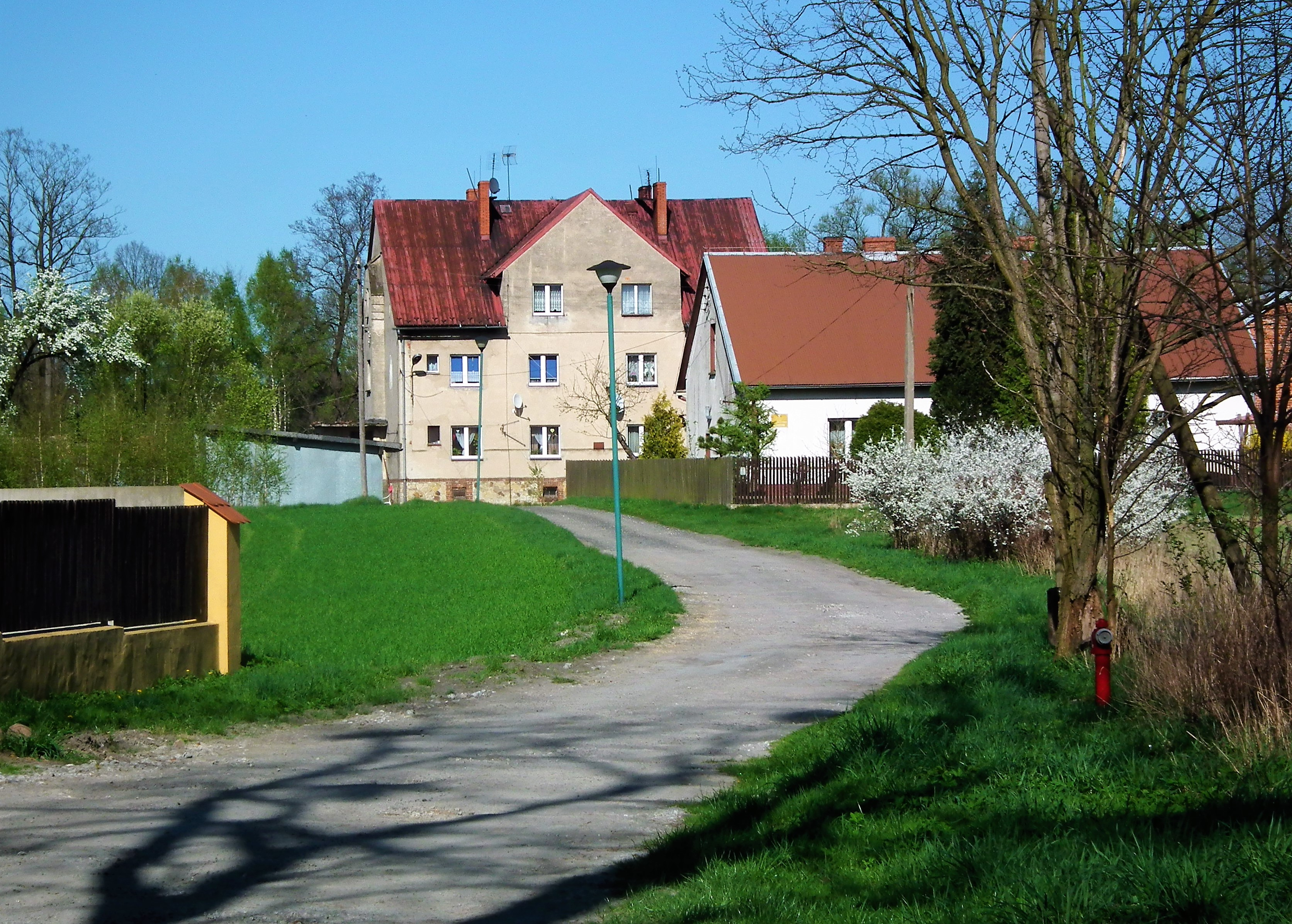

- Location within Poland
- Coordinates: 50°45′N 18°45′E
- Country: Poland
- Voivodeship: Silesian
- County: Lubliniec
- Gmina: Herby
- Population: 55

Braszczok [ˈbraʂt͡ʂɔk] is a village in the administrative district of Gmina Herby, within Lubliniec County, Silesian Voivodeship, in southern Poland.
