= Pawełki, Silesian Voivodeship =

Pawełki
- Village
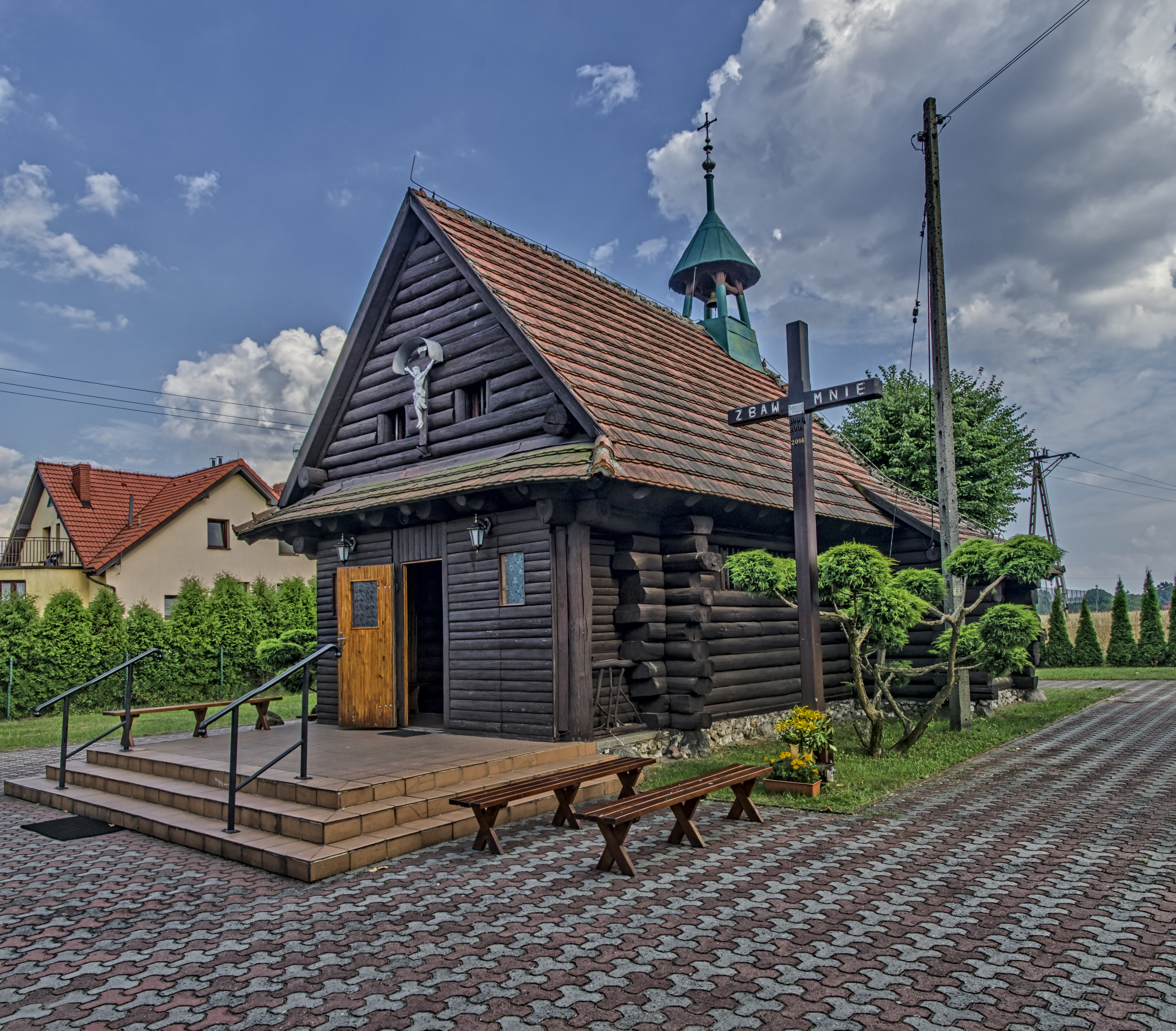
- Catholic church

- Location within Poland
- Coordinates: 50°44′N 18°40′E
- Country: Poland
- Voivodeship: Silesian
- County: Lubliniec
- Gmina: Kochanowice
- Population: 198

Pawełki [paˈvɛu̯ki] is a village in the administrative district of Gmina Kochanowice, within Lubliniec County, Silesian Voivodeship, in southern Poland.
