= Łęg, Lubliniec County =

Łęg
- Settlement
- Location within Poland
- Coordinates: 50°46′N 18°46′E
- Country: Poland
- Voivodeship: Silesian
- County: Lubliniec
- Gmina: Herby
- Population: 27

Łęg [wɛŋk] is a settlement in the administrative district of Gmina Herby, within Lubliniec County, Silesian Voivodeship, in southern Poland.
