= Ostrów, Lubliniec County =

Ostrów
- Village
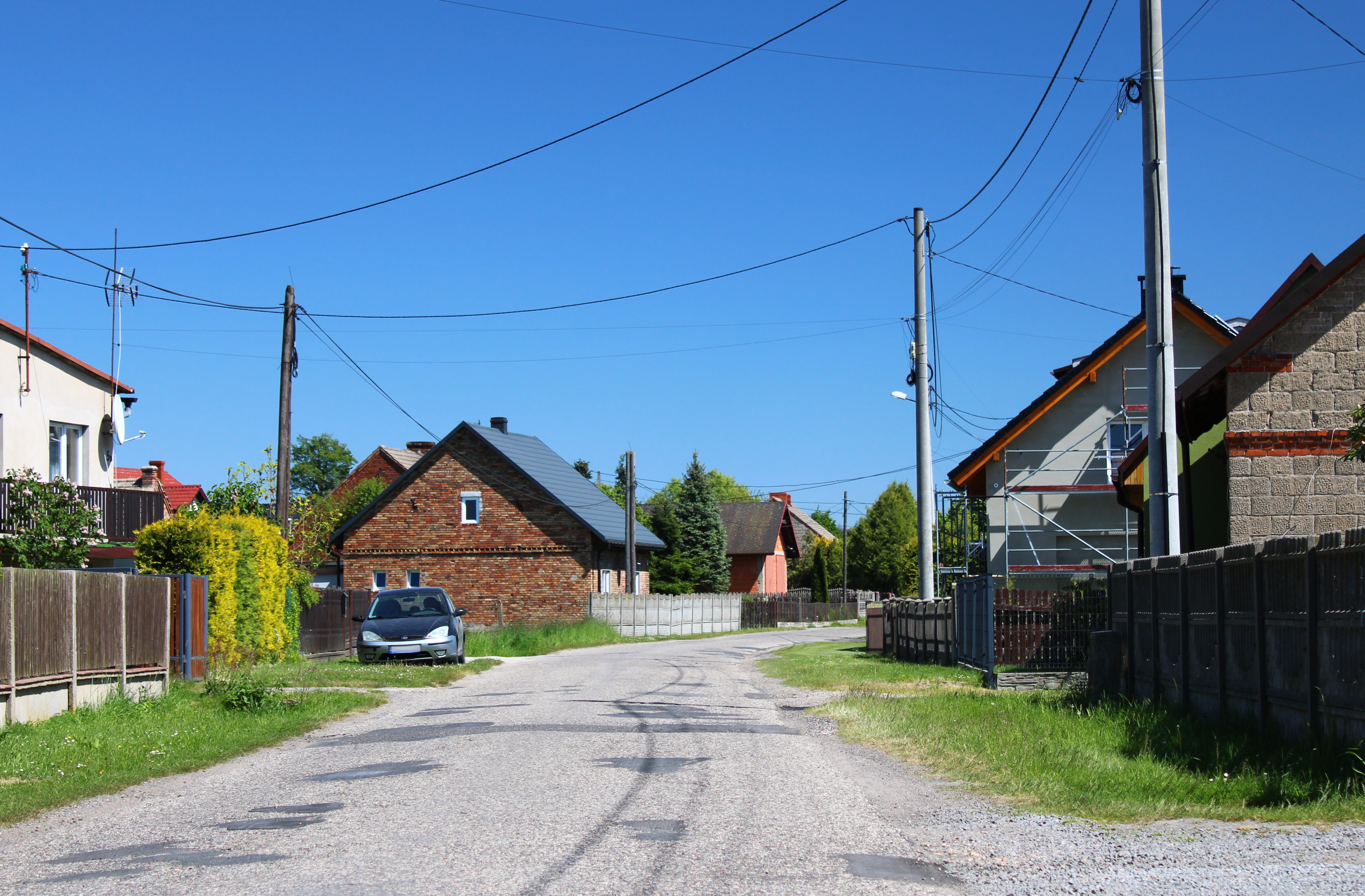

- Location within Poland
- Coordinates: 50°43′58″N 18°45′37″E
- Country: Poland
- Voivodeship: Silesian
- County: Lubliniec
- Gmina: Kochanowice
- Population: 217

Ostrów [ˈɔstruf] is a village in the administrative district of Gmina Kochanowice, within Lubliniec County, Silesian Voivodeship, in southern Poland.
