= Molna =

- Village
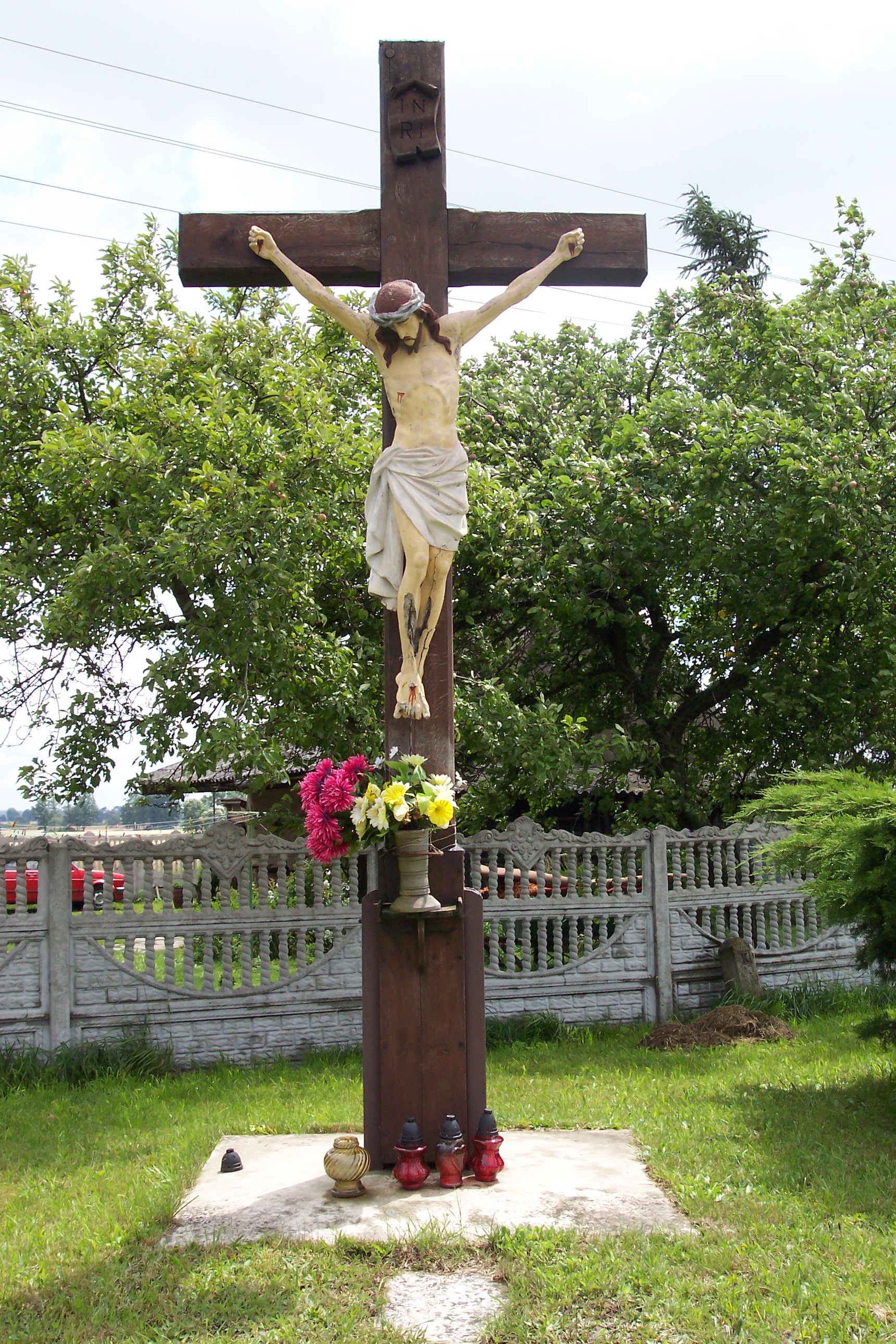
- Roadside cross

- Location within Poland
- Coordinates: 50°46′N 18°37′E
- Country: Poland
- Voivodeship: Silesian
- County: Lubliniec
- Gmina: Ciasna
- Population: 372

Molna [ˈmɔlna] is a village in the administrative district of Gmina Ciasna, within Lubliniec County, Silesian Voivodeship, in southern Poland.
