= Hadra =

Hadra can be:

- Hadra, Poland, a village
- Hadra (genus), a genus of snails
- Hadra (word), an Arabic word used in various forms of address
- Hadra (Sufism), rituals performed by Sufi orders
- Hadra vase, a type of ancient Greek pottery
- El Hadra, village in Sudan
