= Kolonia Lisów =

- Village
- Location within Poland
- Coordinates: 50°44′N 18°49′E
- Country: Poland
- Voivodeship: Silesian
- County: Lubliniec
- Gmina: Herby
- Population: 49

Kolonia Lisów ([kɔˈlɔɲa ˈlisuf]; translation: Colony of Foxes) is a village in the administrative district of Gmina Herby, within Lubliniec County, Silesian Voivodeship, in southern Poland.
