= Mochała =

- Village
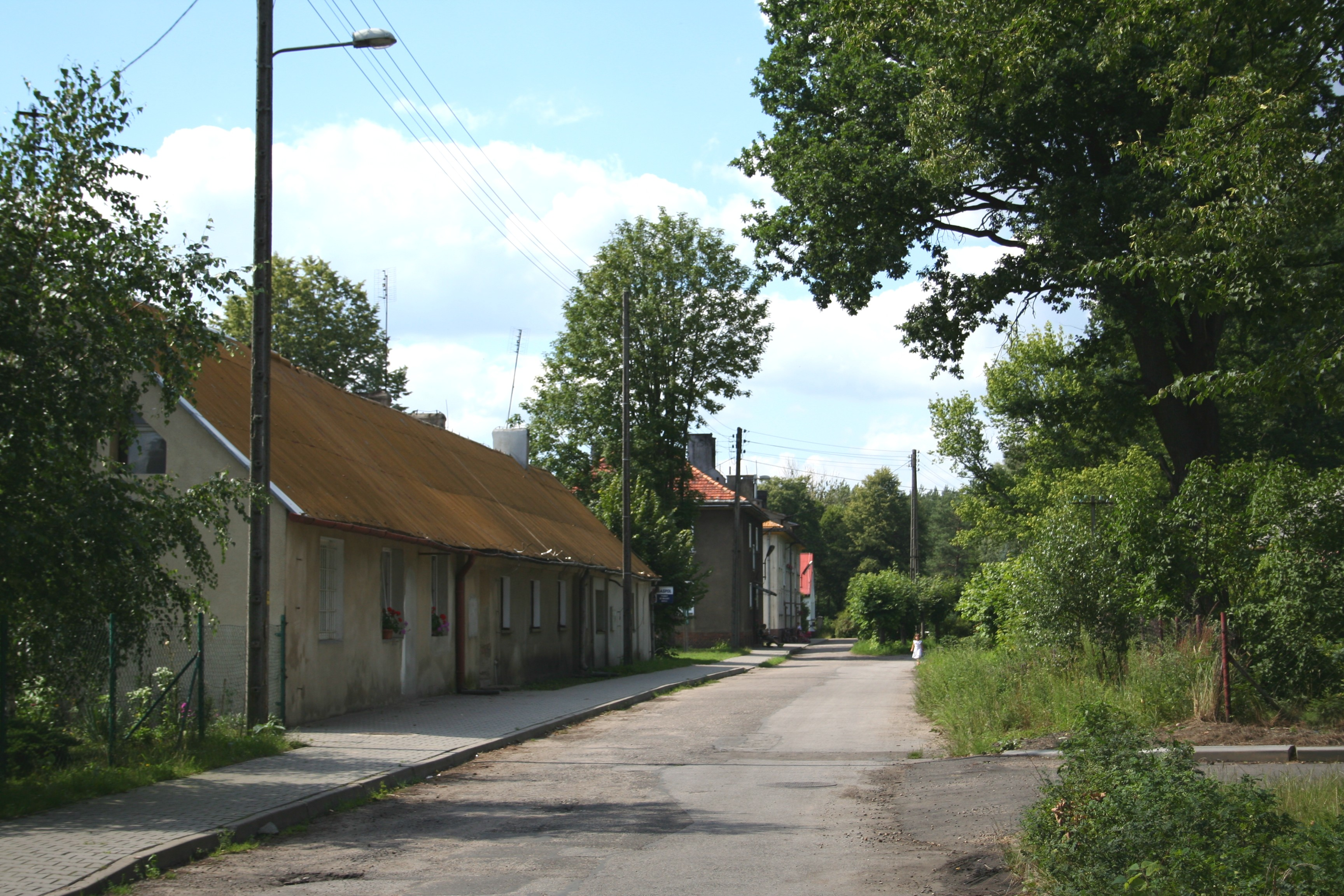

- Location within Poland
- Coordinates: 50°42′N 18°49′E
- Country: Poland
- Voivodeship: Silesian
- County: Lubliniec
- Gmina: Herby
- Population: 193

Mochała [mɔˈxawa] is a village in the administrative district of Gmina Herby, within Lubliniec County, Silesian Voivodeship, in southern Poland.
