= Cztery Kopy =

- Settlement
- Location within Poland
- Coordinates: 50°43′56″N 18°55′18″E
- Country: Poland
- Voivodeship: Silesian
- County: Lubliniec
- Gmina: Herby
- Population: 9

Cztery Kopy [ˈt͡ʂtɛrɨ ˈkɔpɨ] is a settlement in the administrative district of Gmina Herby, within Lubliniec County, Silesian Voivodeship, in southern Poland.
