= Łebki, Silesian Voivodeship =

Łebki
- Village
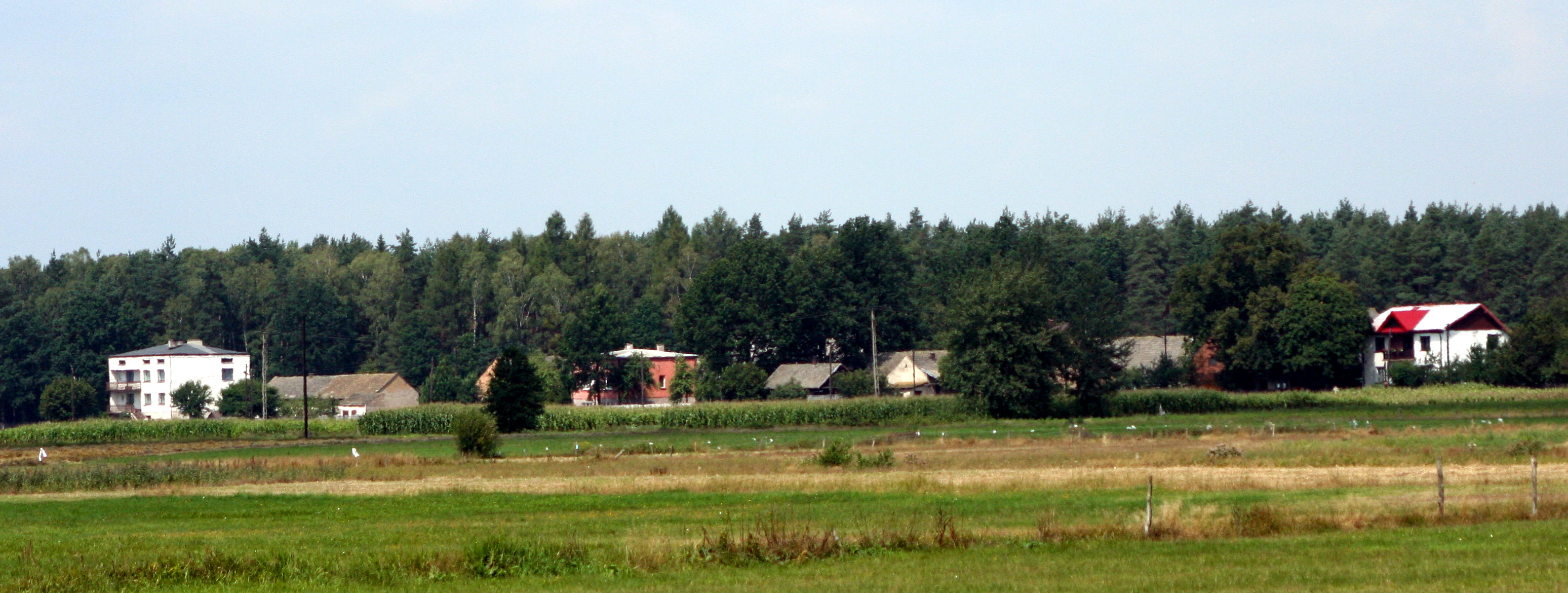

- Location within Poland
- Coordinates: 50°46′N 18°45′E
- Country: Poland
- Voivodeship: Silesian
- County: Lubliniec
- Gmina: Herby
- Population: 68

Łebki [ˈwɛpkʲi] is a village in the administrative district of Gmina Herby, within Lubliniec County, Silesian Voivodeship, in southern Poland.
