= Lubecko =

- Village
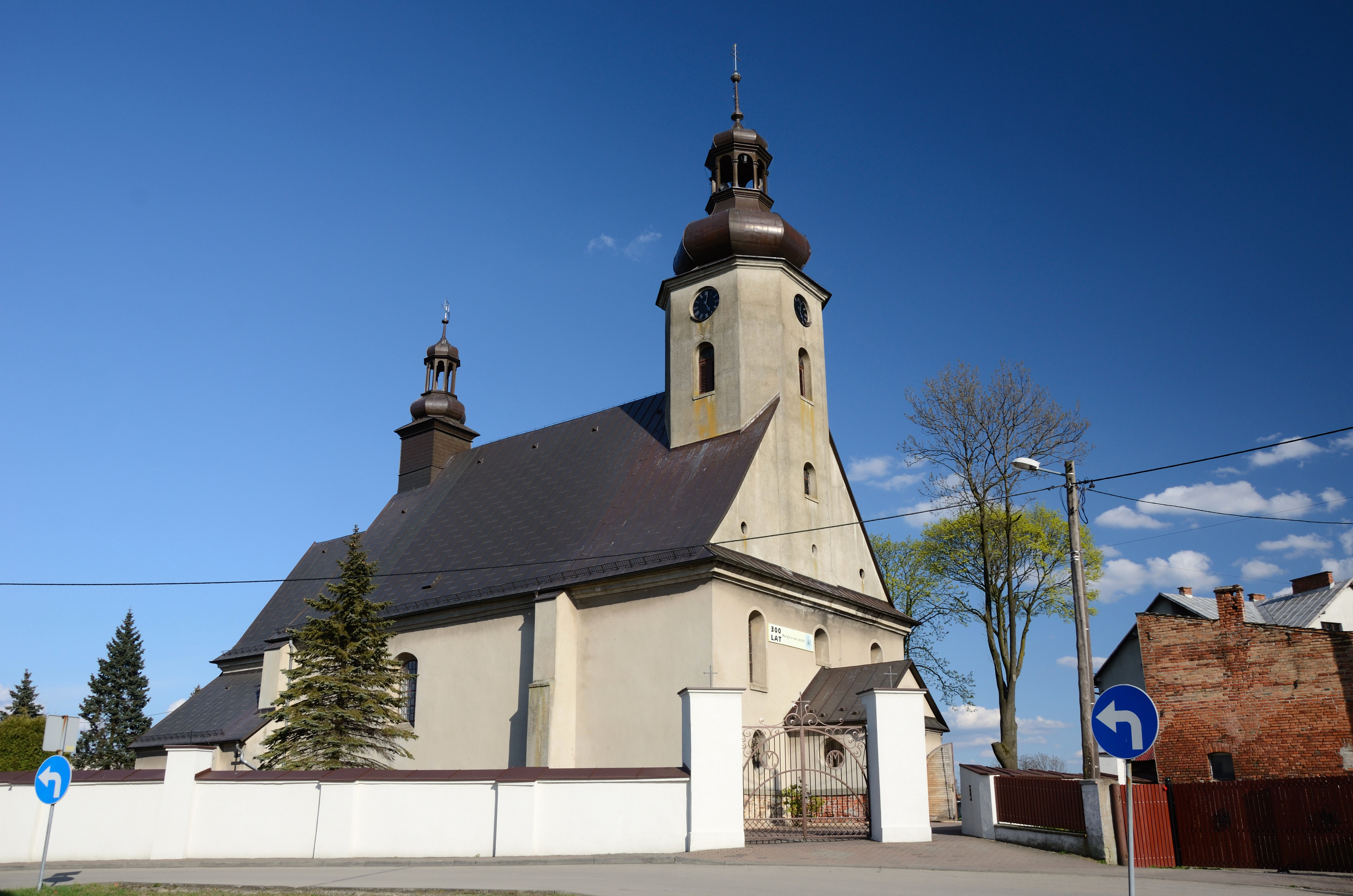
- Catholic church

- Location within Poland
- Coordinates: 50°41′N 18°38′E
- Country: Poland
- Voivodeship: Silesian
- County: Lubliniec
- Gmina: Kochanowice
- Elevation: 295 m (968 ft)
- Population: 822
- Website: https://lubecko.eu/

Lubecko [luˈbɛt͡skɔ] is a village in the administrative district of Gmina Kochanowice, within Lubliniec County, Silesian Voivodeship, in southern Poland.

First written mention about Lubecku come from 1226. A church was built here, most probably, in early 14th century. From 1921 Lubecko belonged to Poland. In 1944 Lubecko was bombed, by mistake, by US air-forces. Almost half the village destroyed and 6 persons died. In December 2009, exquisite wall paintings (frescoes) from early 14th century were uncovered in Lubecko's church.
