= Swaciok =

- Village
- Location within Poland
- Coordinates: 50°42′0″N 18°45′0″E
- Country: Poland
- Voivodeship: Silesian
- County: Lubliniec
- Gmina: Kochanowice
- Population: 38

Swaciok [ˈsfat͡ɕɔk] is a village in the administrative district of Gmina Kochanowice, within Lubliniec County, Silesian Voivodeship, in southern Poland.
