= Glinica, Silesian Voivodeship =

Glinica
- Village
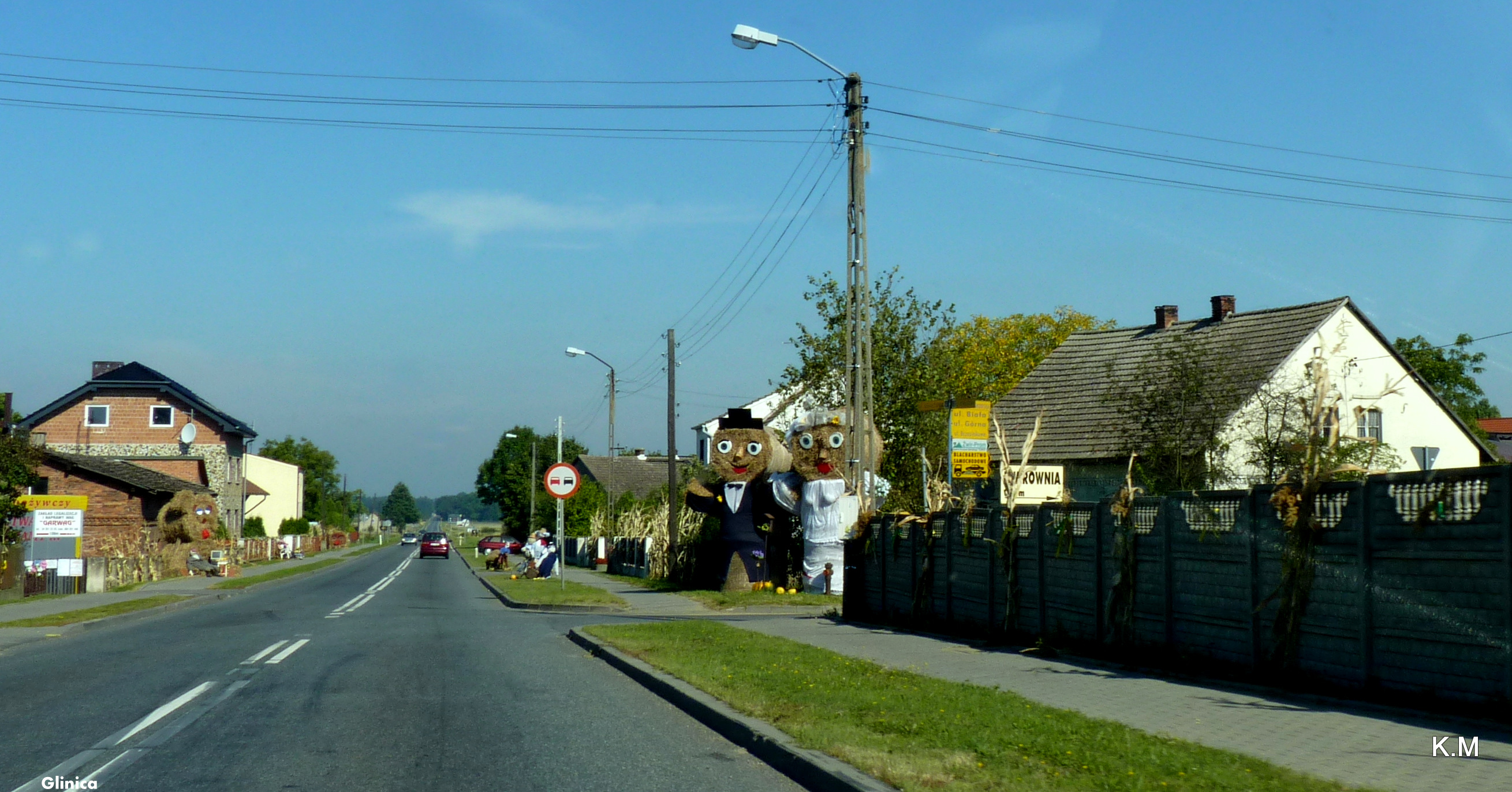

- Location within Poland
- Coordinates: 50°43′N 18°38′E
- Country: Poland
- Voivodeship: Silesian
- County: Lubliniec
- Gmina: Ciasna
- Population: 984
- Website: http://www.glinica.pl/news.php

Glinica [ɡliˈnit͡sa] is a village in the administrative district of Gmina Ciasna, within Lubliniec County, Silesian Voivodeship, in southern Poland.
