= Kierzki, Silesian Voivodeship =

Kierzki
- Village
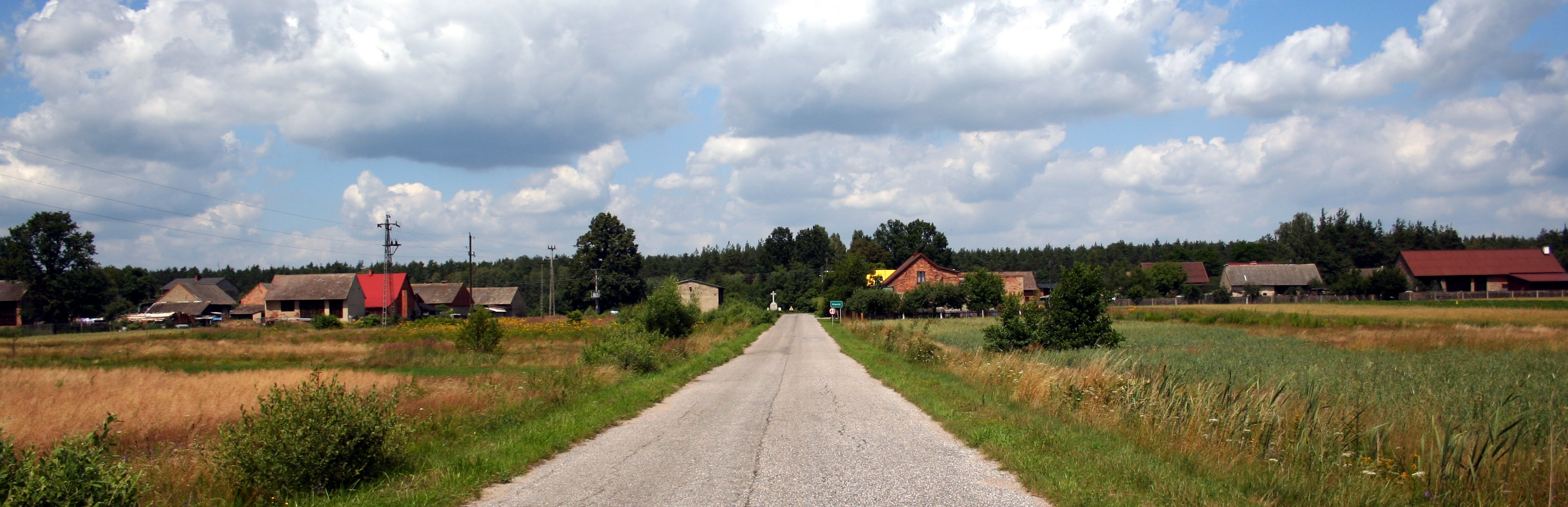

- Location within Poland
- Coordinates: 50°42′42″N 18°50′56″E
- Country: Poland
- Voivodeship: Silesian
- County: Lubliniec
- Gmina: Herby
- Population: 57

Kierzki [ˈkʲɛʂkʲi] is a village in the administrative district of Gmina Herby, within Lubliniec County, Silesian Voivodeship, in southern Poland.
