= Harbułtowice =

- Village
- Location within Poland
- Coordinates: 50°41′N 18°47′E
- Country: Poland
- Voivodeship: Silesian
- County: Lubliniec
- Gmina: Kochanowice

Harbułtowice [xarbuu̯tɔˈvit͡sɛ] is a village in the administrative district of Gmina Kochanowice, within Lubliniec County, Silesian Voivodeship, in southern Poland.
