= Niwy, Gmina Herby =

Niwy
- Settlement
- Location within Poland
- Coordinates: 50°44′N 18°46′E
- Country: Poland
- Voivodeship: Silesian
- County: Lubliniec
- Gmina: Herby
- Population: 21

Niwy [ˈɲivɨ] is a settlement in the administrative district of Gmina Herby, within Lubliniec County, Silesian Voivodeship, in southern Poland.
