= Panoszów =

- Village
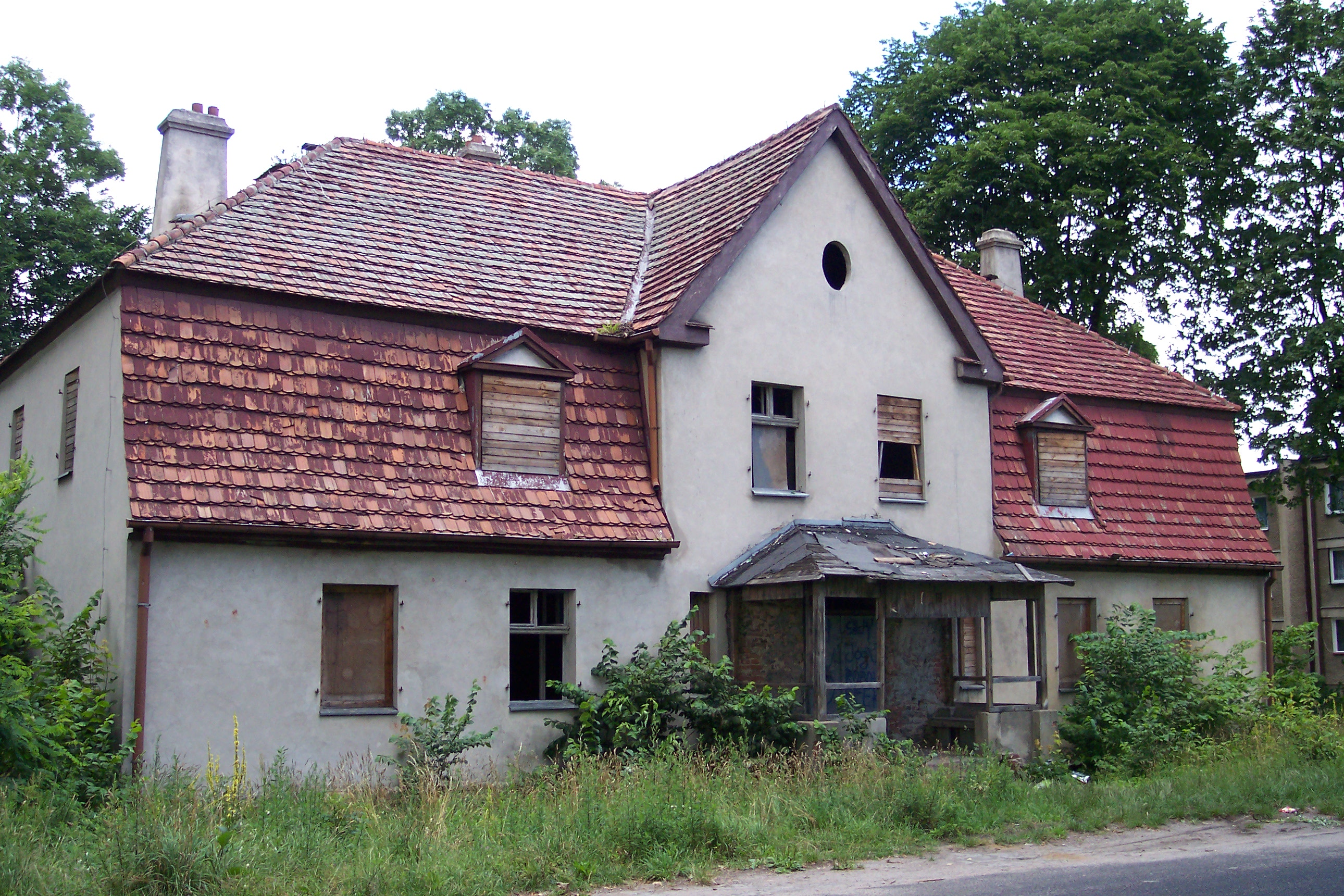
- Manor house

- Location within Poland
- Coordinates: 50°48′45″N 18°37′50″E
- Country: Poland
- Voivodeship: Silesian
- County: Lubliniec
- Gmina: Ciasna
- Population: 652

Panoszów [paˈnɔʂuf] is a village in the administrative district of Gmina Ciasna, within Lubliniec County, Silesian Voivodeship, in southern Poland.
