= Zborowskie, Silesian Voivodeship =

Zborowskie
- Village
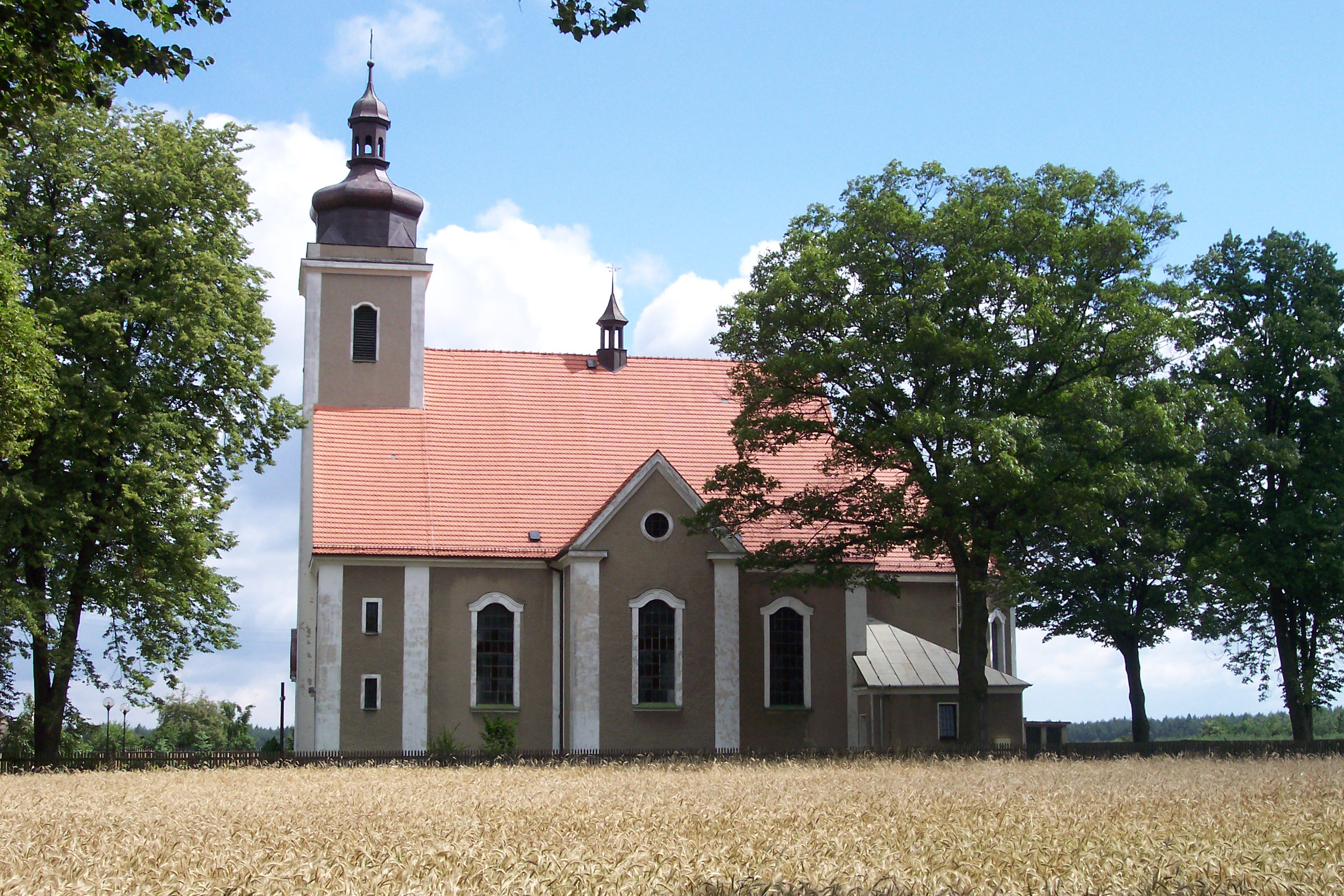
- Catholic church

- Location within Poland
- Coordinates: 50°47′N 18°40′E
- Country: Poland
- Voivodeship: Silesian
- County: Lubliniec
- Gmina: Ciasna
- Population: 1,081

Zborowskie [zbɔˈrɔfskʲɛ] is a village in the administrative district of Gmina Ciasna, within Lubliniec County, Silesian Voivodeship, in southern Poland.
