= Chwostek =

- Village
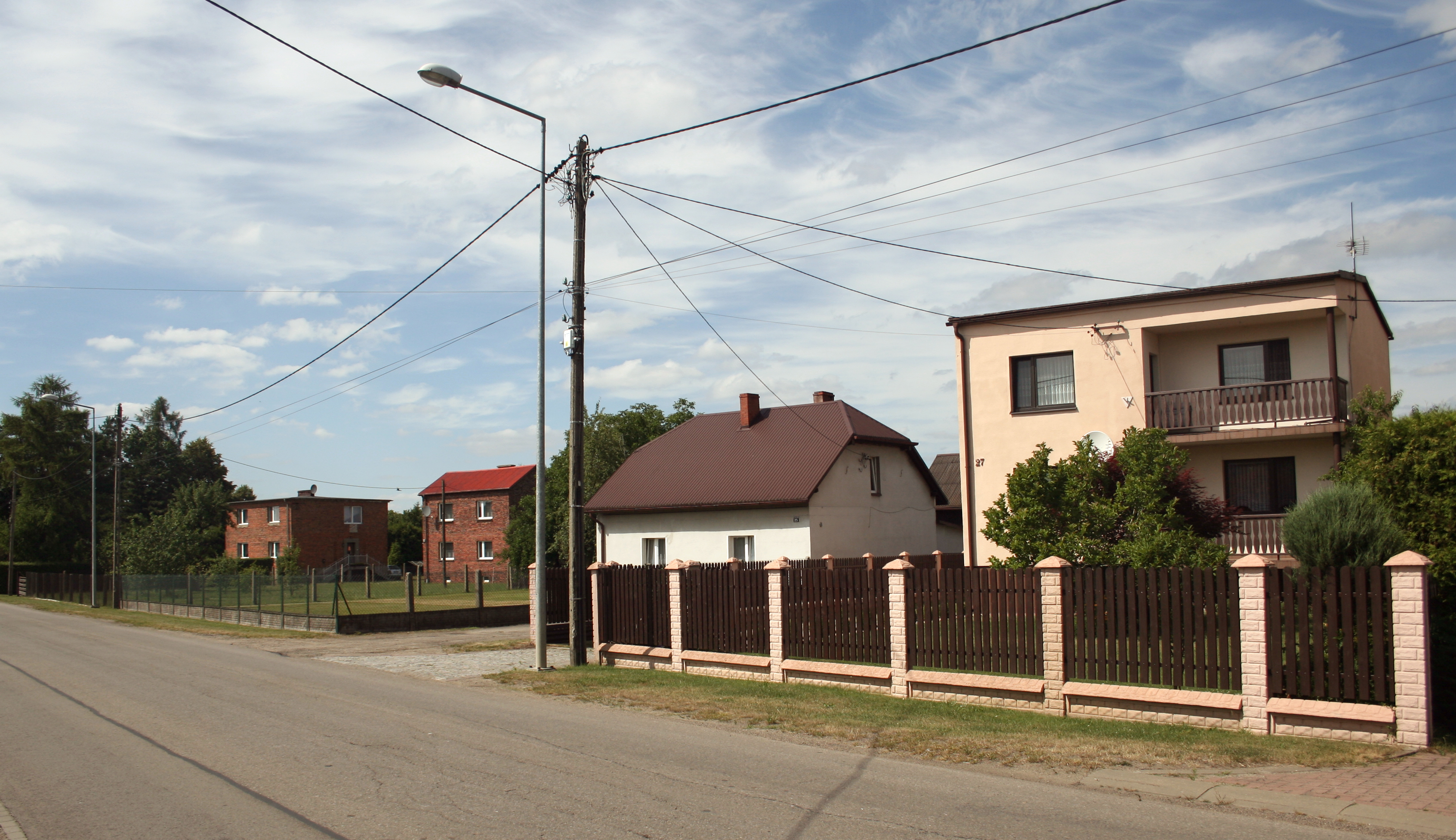

- Location within Poland
- Coordinates: 50°43′N 18°48′E
- Country: Poland
- Voivodeship: Silesian
- County: Lubliniec
- Gmina: Herby
- Population: 415

Chwostek [ˈxfɔstɛk] is a village in the administrative district of Gmina Herby, in Lubliniec County, Silesian Voivodeship, in southern Poland.
