= Droniowice =

- Village
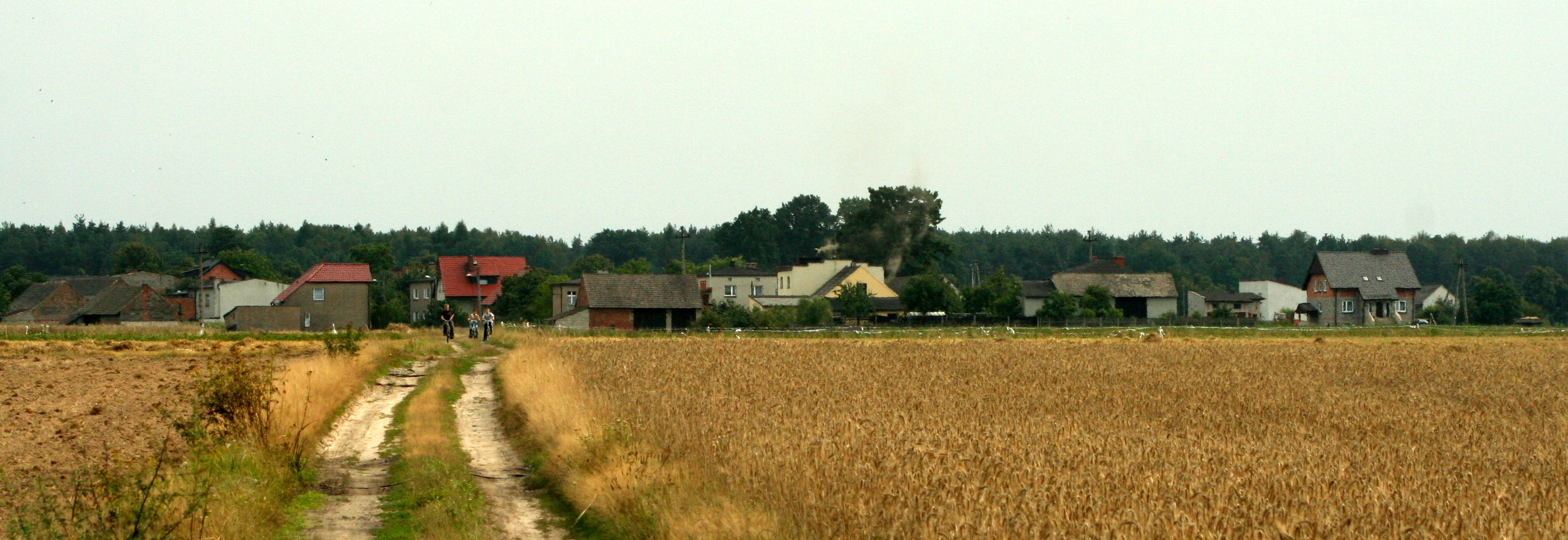

- Location within Poland
- Coordinates: 50°41′N 18°48′E
- Country: Poland
- Voivodeship: Silesian
- County: Lubliniec
- Gmina: Kochanowice
- Population: 384

Droniowice [drɔɲɔˈvit͡sɛ] is a village in the administrative district of Gmina Kochanowice, within Lubliniec County, Silesian Voivodeship, in southern Poland.
