= Sieraków Śląski =

- Village
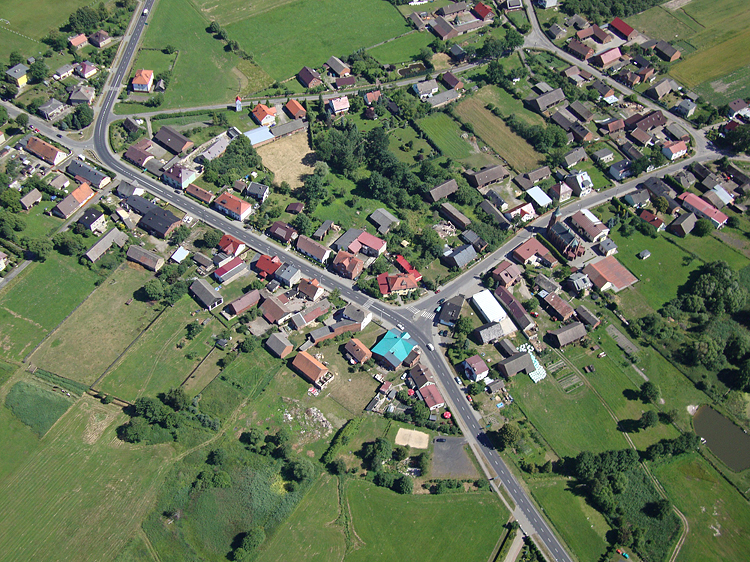

- Location within Poland
- Coordinates: 50°47′N 18°34′E
- Country: Poland
- Voivodeship: Silesian
- County: Lubliniec
- Gmina: Ciasna
- Population: 1,704 (2,008)
- Website: http://sierakowslaski.com.pl/

Sieraków Śląski (Polish pronunciation: [ɕɛˈrakuf ˈɕlɔ̃skʲi]) is a village in the administrative district of Gmina Ciasna, within Lubliniec County, Silesian Voivodeship, in southern Poland.
