= Otrzęsie =

- Settlement
- Location within Poland
- Coordinates: 50°43′N 18°48′E
- Country: Poland
- Voivodeship: Silesian
- County: Lubliniec
- Gmina: Herby
- Population: 2

Otrzęsie [ɔtˈʂɛ̃ɕɛ] is a settlement in the administrative district of Gmina Herby, within Lubliniec County, Silesian Voivodeship, in southern Poland.
