= Jawornica, Silesian Voivodeship =

Jawornica
- Village
- Location within Poland
- Coordinates: 50°41′N 18°42′E
- Country: Poland
- Voivodeship: Silesian
- County: Lubliniec
- Gmina: Kochanowice

Population
  - Total: 535
- Time zone: UTC+1 (CET)
  - Summer (DST): UTC+2 (CEST)
- Vehicle registration: SLU

Jawornica [javɔrˈnit͡sa] is a village located in the administrative district of Gmina Kochanowice, within Lubliniec County, Silesian Voivodeship, in southern Poland.

== Etymology ==
The name of the village is of Polish origin, and comes from word jawor ("sycamore maple").
