= Lubockie =

- Village
- Location within Poland
- Coordinates: 50°43′N 18°44′E
- Country: Poland
- Voivodeship: Silesian
- County: Lubliniec
- Gmina: Kochanowice
- Population: 377

Lubockie [luˈbɔt͡skʲɛ] is a village in the administrative district of Gmina Kochanowice, within Lubliniec County, Silesian Voivodeship, in southern Poland.
