= Szklarnia, Lubliniec County =

Szklarnia
- Village
- Location within Poland
- Coordinates: 50°42′N 18°42′E
- Country: Poland
- Voivodeship: Silesian
- County: Lubliniec
- Gmina: Kochanowice
- Population: 78

Szklarnia [ˈʂklarɲa] is a village in the administrative district of Gmina Kochanowice, within Lubliniec County, Silesian Voivodeship, in southern Poland.
