= Piłka, Gmina Herby =

Piłka
- Settlement
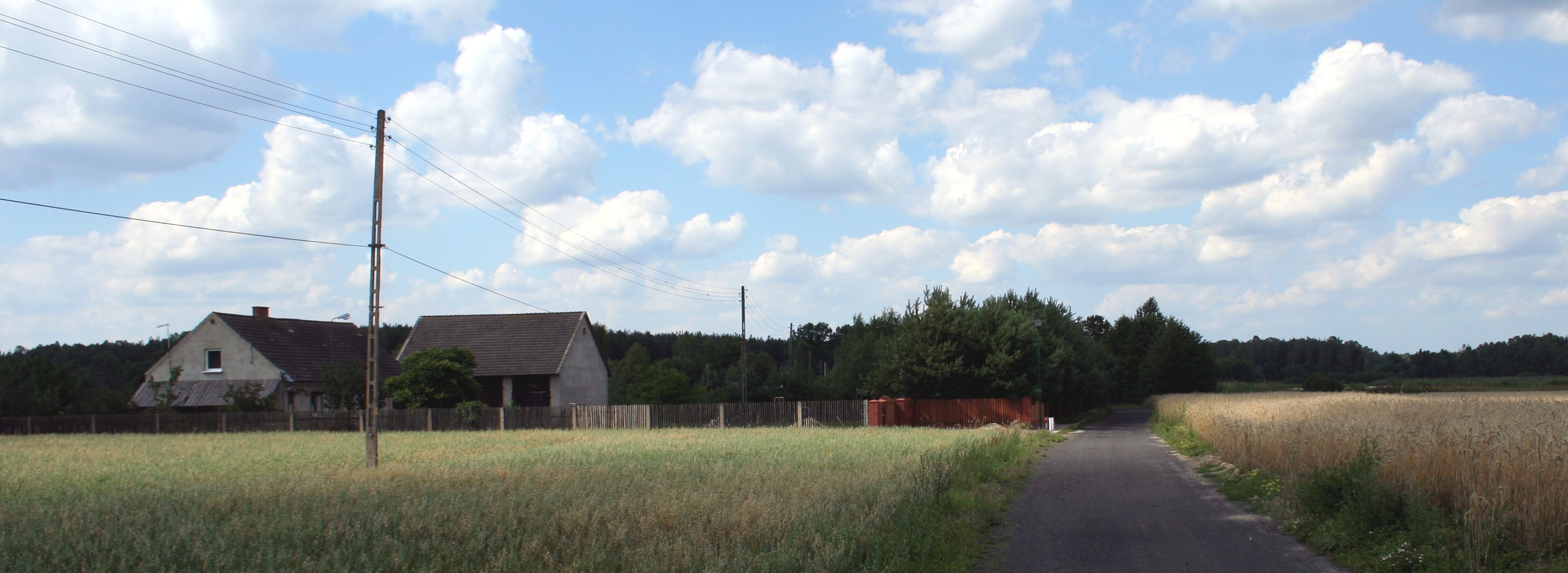
- Fields in Piłka

- Location within Poland
- Coordinates: 50°42′56″N 18°49′09″E
- Country: Poland
- Voivodeship: Silesian
- County: Lubliniec
- Gmina: Herby
- Population: 23

Piłka [ˈpiu̯ka] is a settlement in the administrative district of Gmina Herby, within Lubliniec County, Silesian Voivodeship, in southern Poland.
