= Wędzina =

- Village
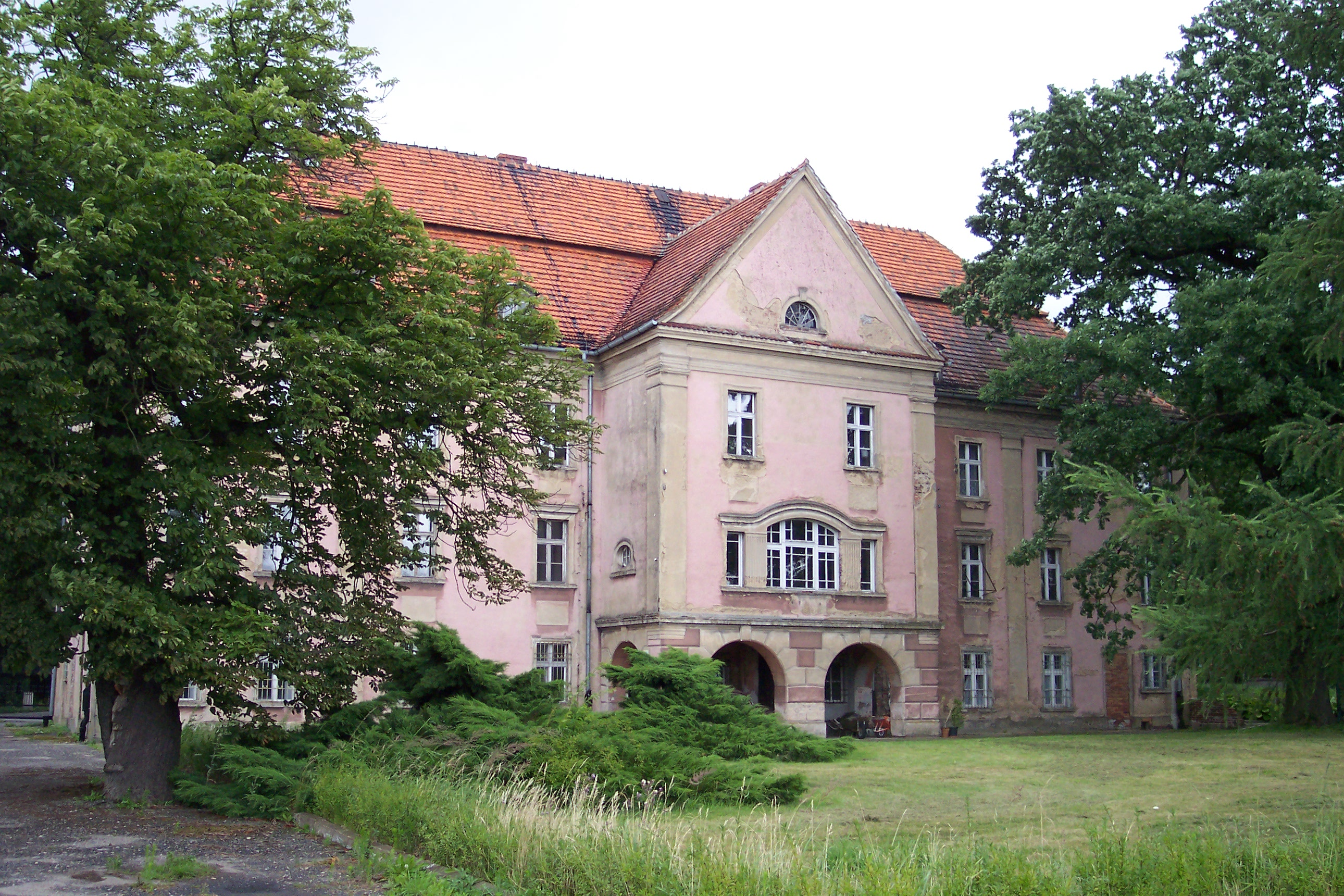
- Palace

- Location within Poland
- Coordinates: 50°50′N 18°35′E
- Country: Poland
- Voivodeship: Silesian
- County: Lubliniec
- Gmina: Ciasna
- Population: 675

Wędzina [vɛnˈd͡ʑina] is a village in the administrative district of Gmina Ciasna, within Lubliniec County, Silesian Voivodeship, in southern Poland.
