= Pietrzaki =

- Village
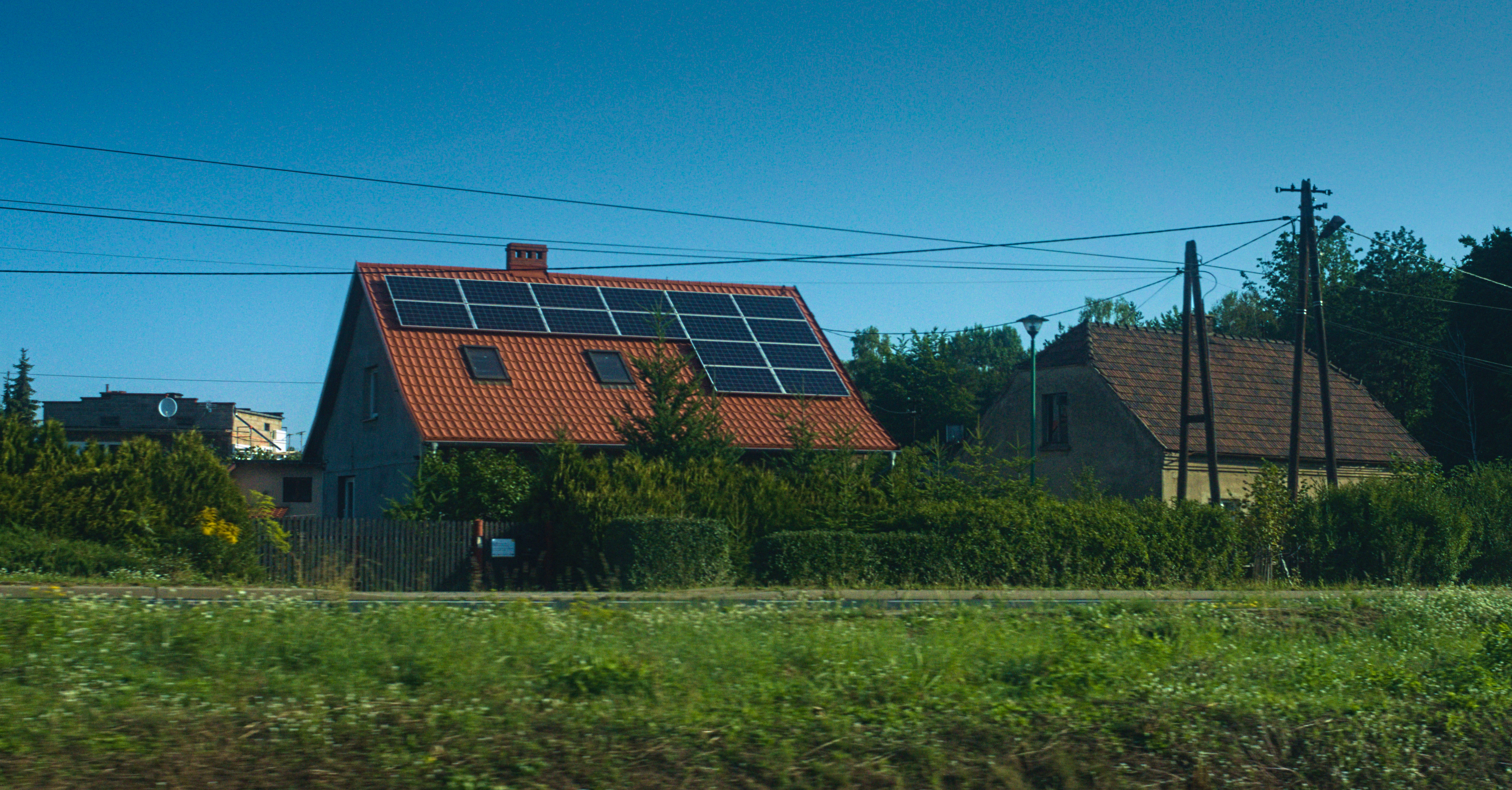
- Houses in Pietrzaki, Częstochowska Street (2019)

- Location within Poland
- Coordinates: 50°45′N 18°55′E
- Country: Poland
- Voivodeship: Silesian
- County: Lubliniec
- Gmina: Herby
- Population: 100 (2,011)

Pietrzaki [pjɛtˈʂakʲi] is a village in the administrative district of Gmina Herby, within Lubliniec County, Silesian Voivodeship, in southern Poland.
