= Głąby =

- Settlement
- Location within Poland
- Coordinates: 50°45′18″N 18°49′30″E
- Country: Poland
- Voivodeship: Silesian
- County: Lubliniec
- Gmina: Herby
- Population: 26

Głąby [ˈɡwɔmbɨ] is a settlement in the administrative district of Gmina Herby, within Lubliniec County, Silesian Voivodeship, in southern Poland.
