= Kochanowice =

- Village
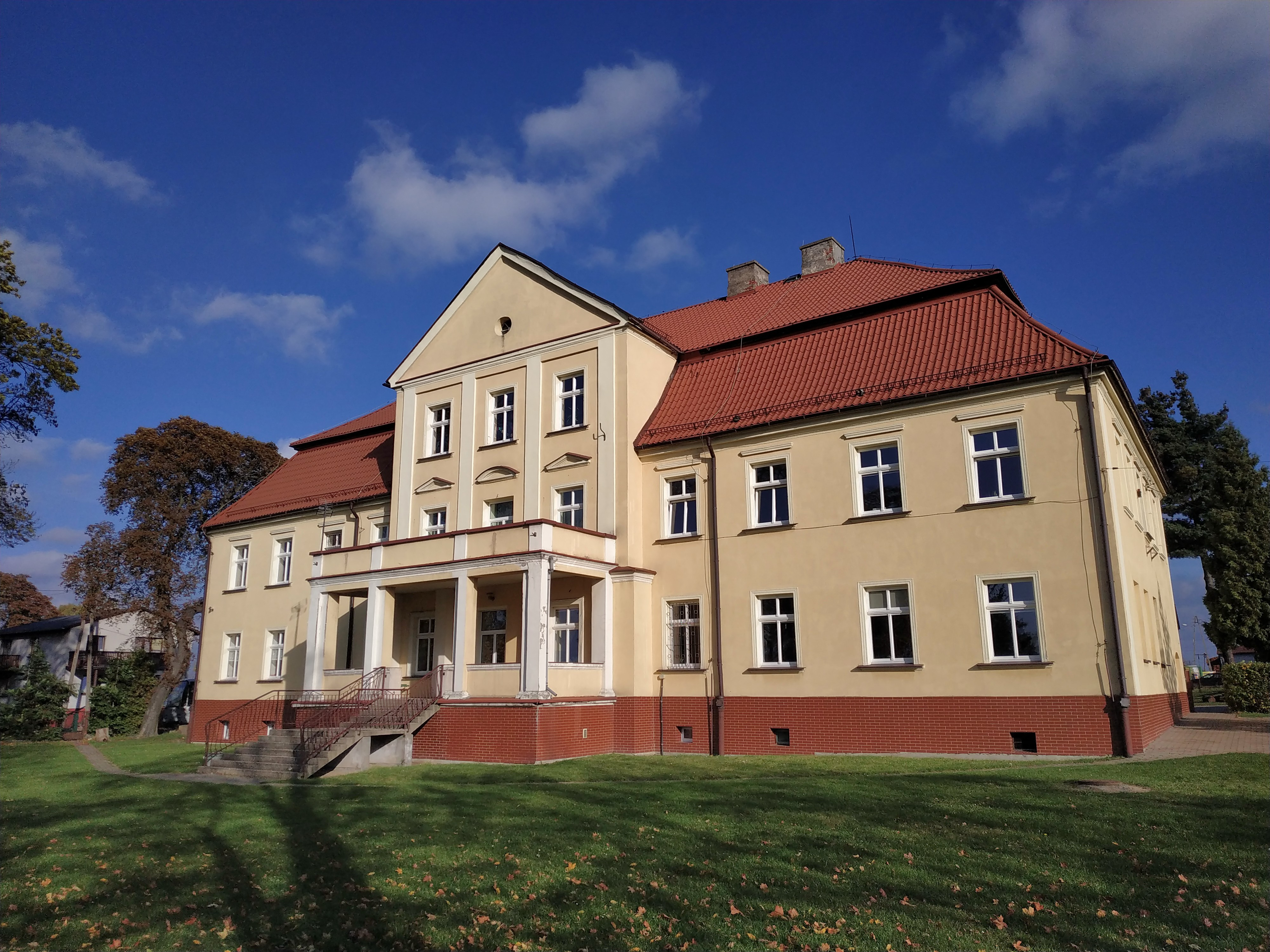
- Palace, 2020

- Coat of arms

- Location within Poland
- Coordinates: 50°42′N 18°45′E
- Country: Poland
- Voivodeship: Silesian
- County: Lubliniec
- Gmina: Kochanowice
- Population: 1,944
- Website: http://www.kochanowice.pl

Kochanowice [kɔxanɔˈvit͡sɛ] is a village in Lubliniec County, Silesian Voivodeship, in southern Poland. It is the seat of the gmina (administrative district) called Gmina Kochanowice.
