= Hadra, Poland =

Hadra
- Village
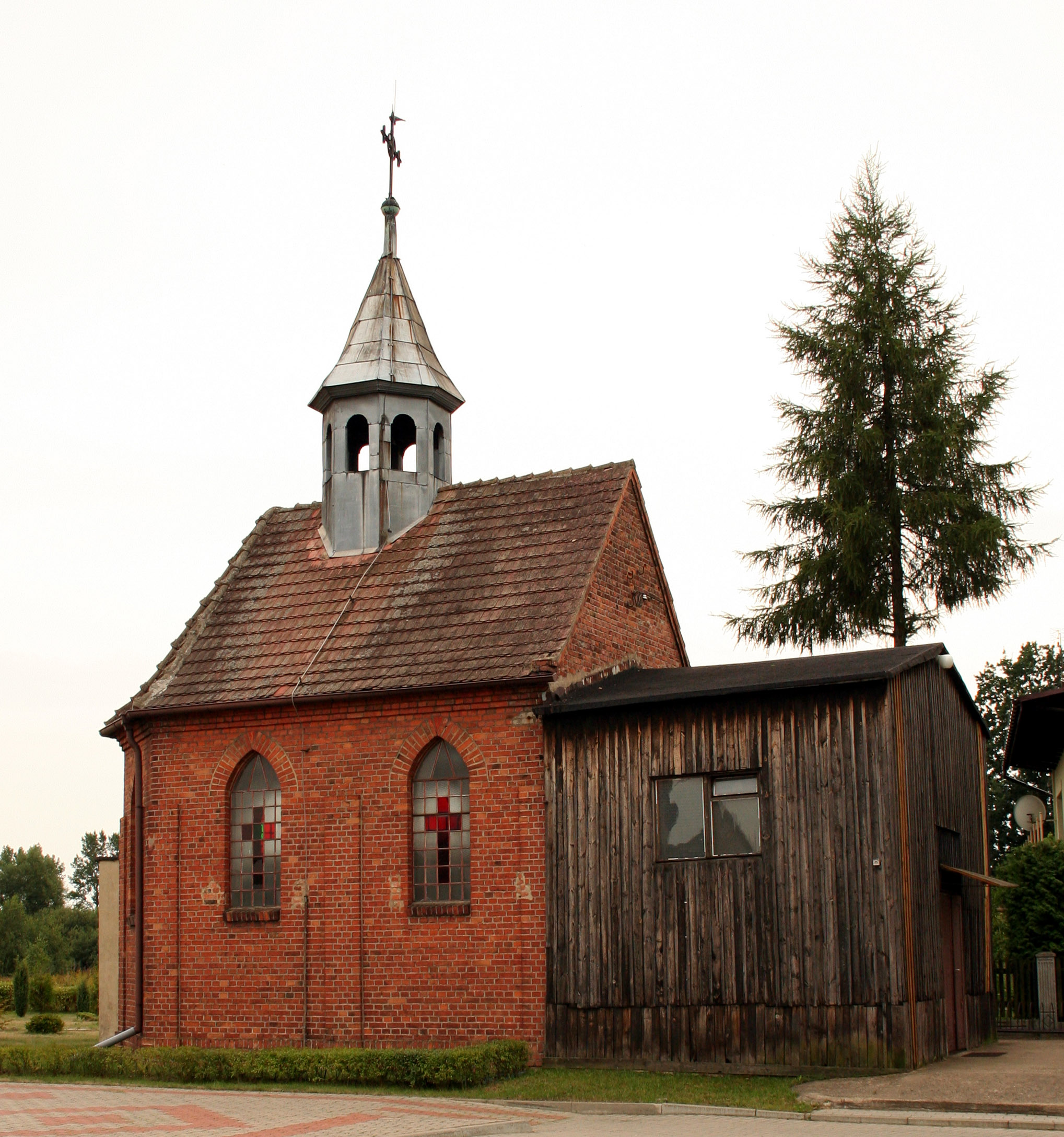
- Chapel

- Location within Poland
- Coordinates: 50°41′N 18°50′E
- Country: Poland
- Voivodeship: Silesian
- County: Lubliniec
- Gmina: Herby
- Population: 409

Hadra [ˈxadra] is a village in the administrative district of Gmina Herby, within Lubliniec County, Silesian Voivodeship, in southern Poland.
