= Mzyki, Lubliniec County =

Mzyki
- Village
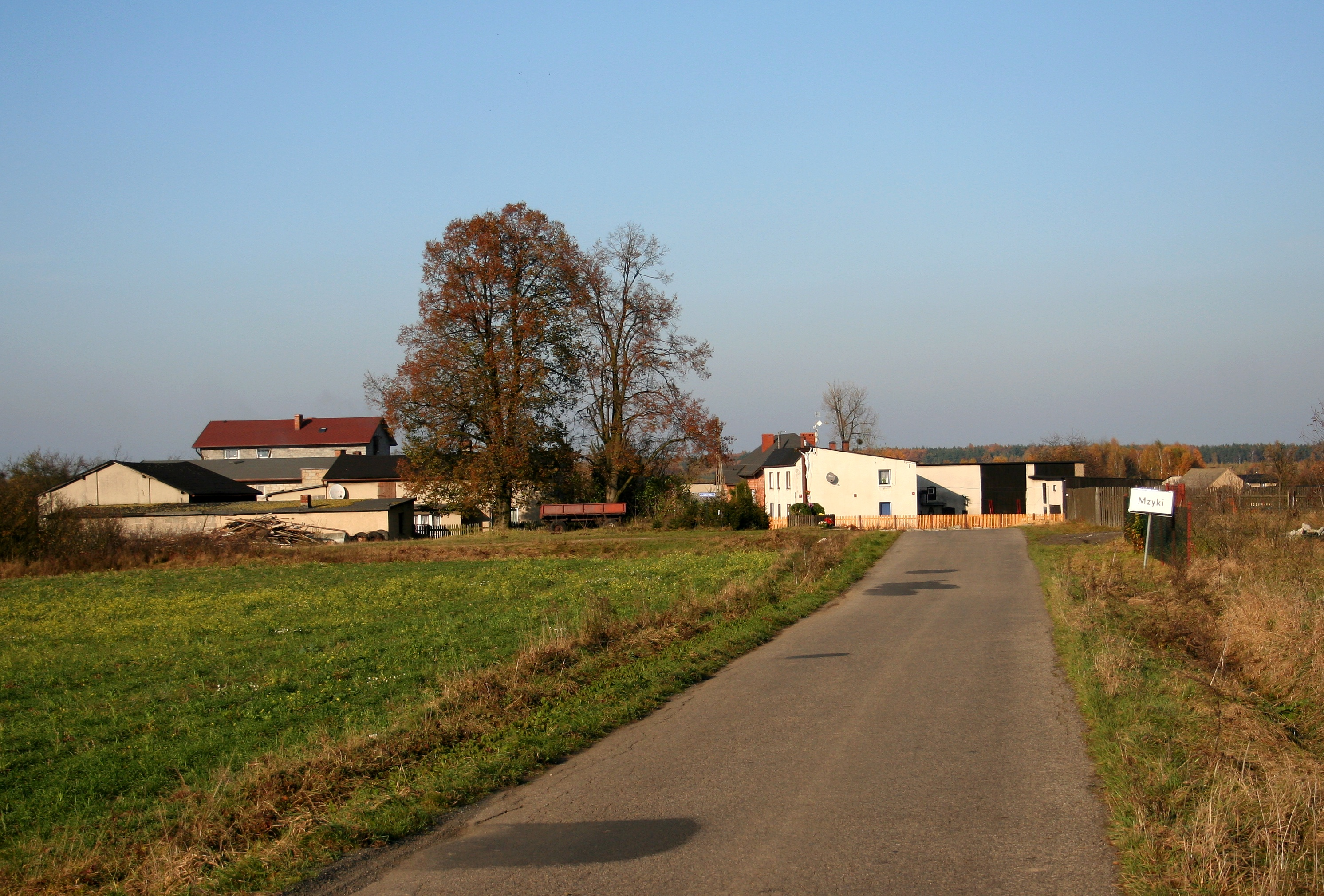

- Location within Poland
- Coordinates: 50°38′39″N 18°57′32″E
- Country: Poland
- Voivodeship: Silesian
- County: Lubliniec
- Gmina: Woźniki
- Population: 114

Mzyki [ˈmzɨki] is a village in the administrative district of Gmina Woźniki, within Lubliniec County, Silesian Voivodeship, in southern Poland.
