= Gmina Ciasna =

Gmina Ciasna Ciasna Commune
- Gmina
- Coat of arms
- Interactive map of Gmina Ciasna
- Coordinates (Ciasna): 50°46′N 18°37′E
- Country: Poland
- Voivodeship: Silesian
- County: Lubliniec
- Seat: Ciasna

Area
  - Total: 134.17 km^{2} (51.80 sq mi)

Population (2019-06-30)
  - Total: 7,467
  - Density: 55.65/km^{2} (144.1/sq mi)
- Website: https://ciasna.pl/

Gmina Ciasna is a rural gmina (administrative district) in Lubliniec County, Silesian Voivodeship, in southern Poland. Its seat is the village of Ciasna, which lies approximately 11 kilometres (7 mi) north-west of Lubliniec and 64 km (40 mi) north-west of the regional capital Katowice.

The gmina covers an area of 134.17 square kilometres (51.8 sq mi), and as of 2019 its total population is 7,467.

The gmina contains part of the protected area called Upper Liswarta Forests Landscape Park.

== Villages ==
Gmina Ciasna contains the villages and settlements of Ciasna, Dzielna, Glinica, Jeżowa, Molna, Panoszów, Sieraków Śląski, Wędzina and Zborowskie.

== Neighbouring gminas ==
Gmina Ciasna is bordered by the gminas of Dobrodzień, Herby, Kochanowice, Olesno, Pawonków and Przystajń.
