= Gmina Kochanowice =

Gmina Kochanowice Kochanowice Commune
- Gmina
- Coat of arms
- Interactive map of Gmina Kochanowice
- Coordinates (Kochanowice): 50°42′N 18°45′E
- Country: Poland
- Voivodeship: Silesian
- County: Lubliniec
- Seat: Kochanowice

Area
  - Total: 80.02 km^{2} (30.90 sq mi)

Population (2019-06-30)
  - Total: 6,925
  - Density: 86.54/km^{2} (224.1/sq mi)
- Website: http://kochanowice.pl/

Gmina Kochanowice is a rural gmina (administrative district) in Lubliniec County, Silesian Voivodeship, in southern Poland. Its seat is the village of Kochanowice, which lies approximately 6 kilometres (4 mi) east of Lubliniec and 53 km (33 mi) north of the regional capital Katowice.

The gmina covers an area of 79.71 square kilometres (30.8 sq mi), and as of 2019 its total population was 6,925.

The gmina contains part of the protected area called Upper Liswarta Forests Landscape Park.

== Villages ==
Gmina Kochanowice contains the villages and settlements of Droniowice, Harbułtowice, Jawornica, Kochanowice, Kochcice, Lubecko, Lubockie, Ostrów, Pawełki, Swaciok and Szklarnia.

== Neighbouring gminas ==
Gmina Kochanowice is bordered by the town of Lubliniec and by the gminas of Ciasna, Herby, Koszęcin and Pawonków.

== Twin towns – sister cities ==
Gmina Kochanowice is twinned with:

- Schöllkrippen, Germany
