= Kochcice =

- Village
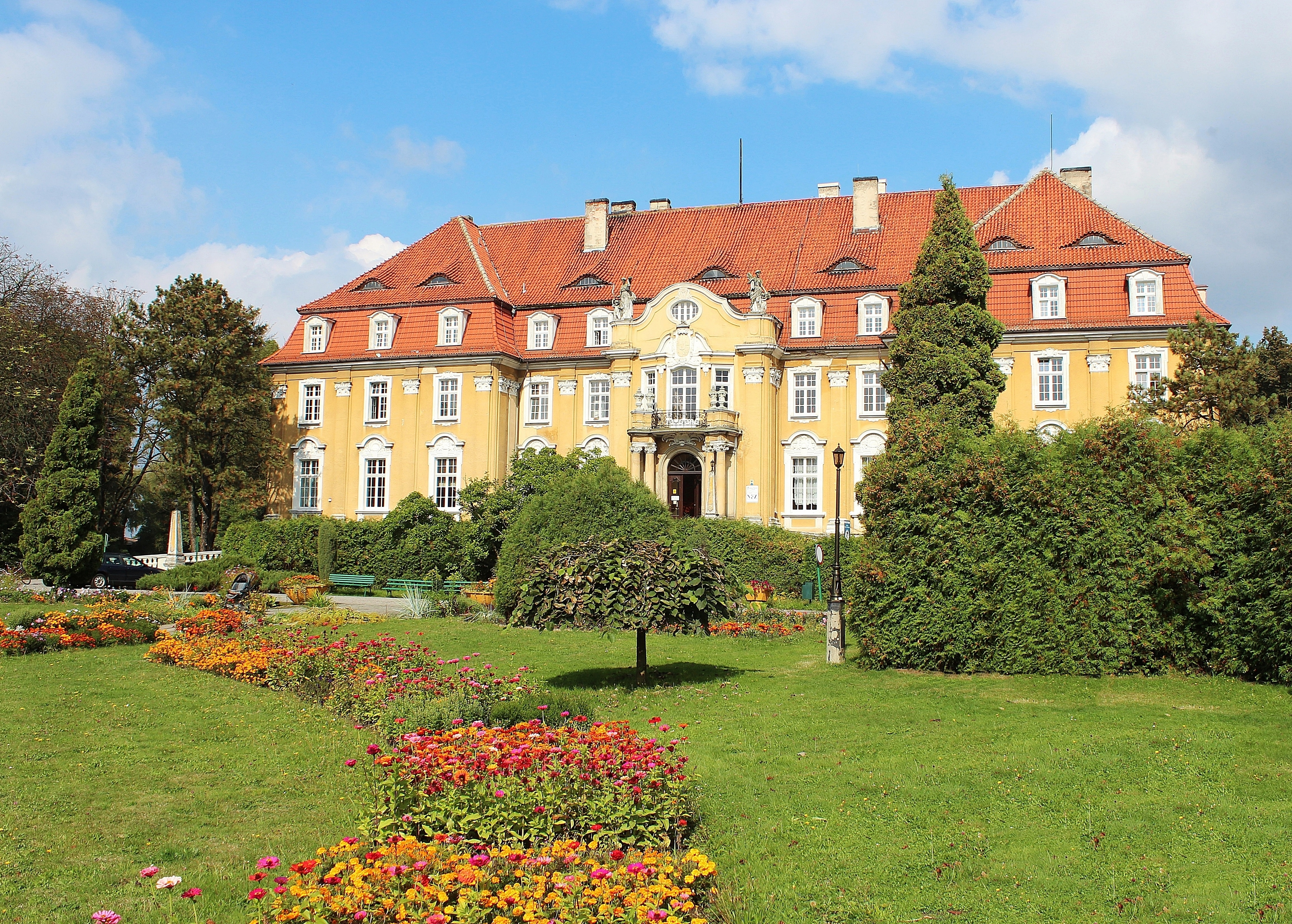
- Palace

- Location within Poland
- Coordinates: 50°42′N 18°41′E
- Country: Poland
- Voivodeship: Silesian
- County: Lubliniec
- Gmina: Kochanowice

Population
  - Total: 1,895
- Time zone: UTC+1 (CET)
  - Summer (DST): UTC+2 (CEST)
- Vehicle registration: SLU

Kochcice [kɔxˈt͡ɕit͡sɛ] is a village in the administrative district of Gmina Kochanowice, within Lubliniec County, Silesian Voivodeship, in southern Poland.

== History ==
The local police chief and two other Polish policemen from Kochcice were murdered by the Russians in the Katyn massacre in 1940.
