= Ciasna =

- Village
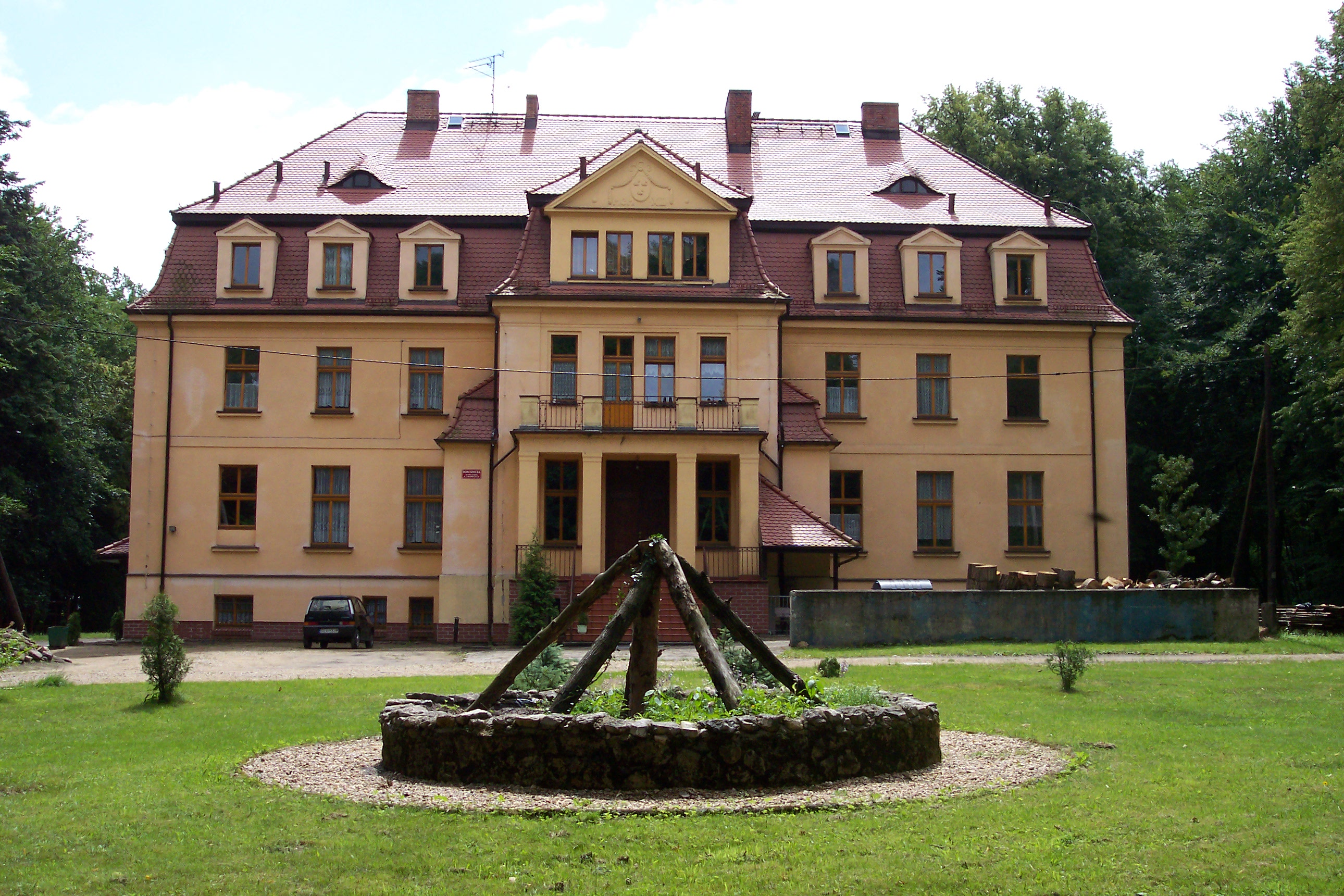
- Palace

- Location within Poland
- Coordinates: 50°45′N 18°36′E
- Country: Poland
- Voivodeship: Silesian
- County: Lubliniec
- Gmina: Ciasna
- Population: 1,722

Ciasna [ˈt͡ɕasna] is a village in Lubliniec County, Silesian Voivodeship, in southern Poland. It is the seat of the gmina (administrative district) called Gmina Ciasna.
