= Tanina, Silesian Voivodeship =

Tanina
- Village
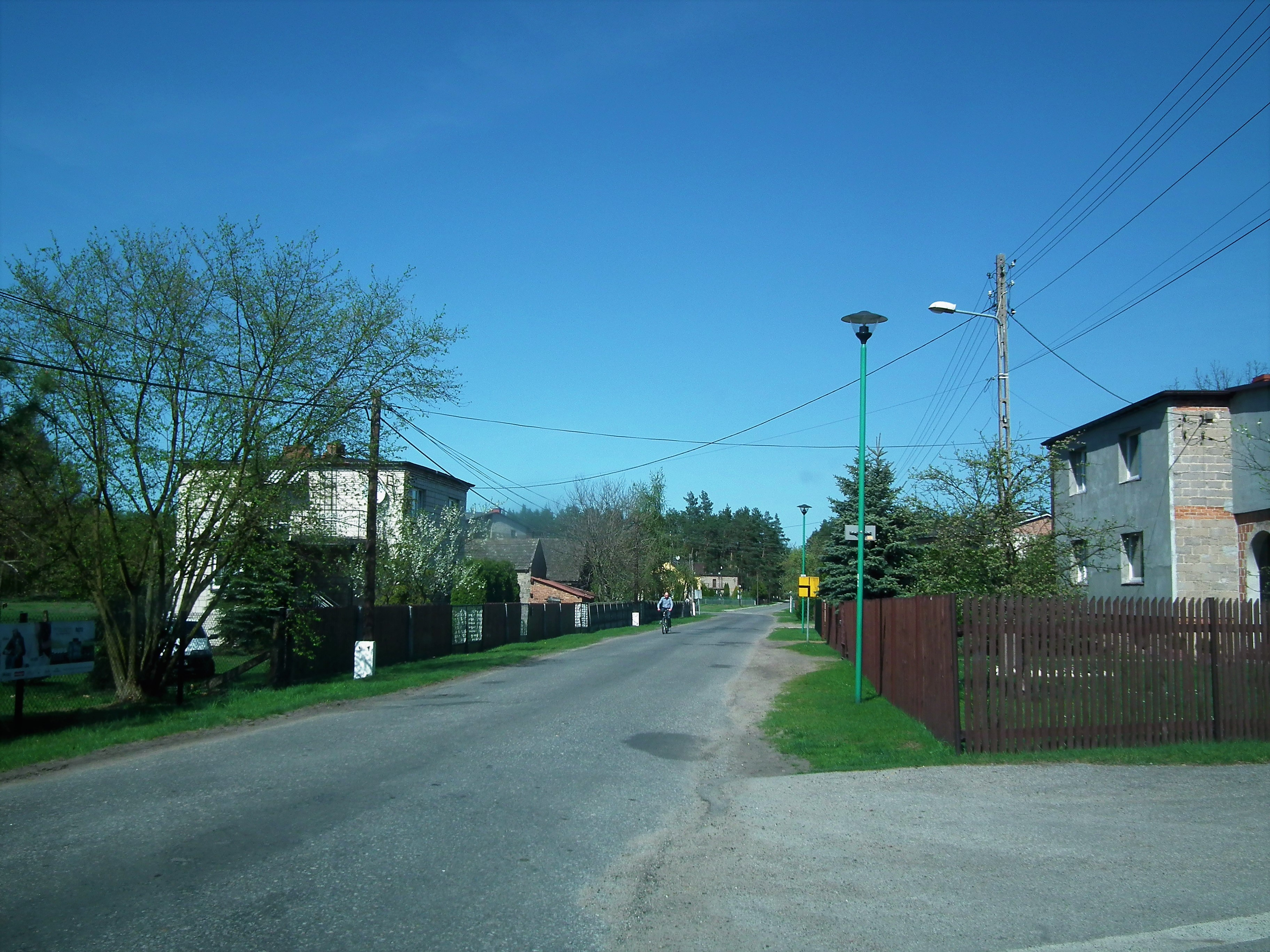

- Location within Poland
- Coordinates: 50°44′N 18°47′E
- Country: Poland
- Voivodeship: Silesian
- County: Lubliniec
- Gmina: Herby
- Population: 124

Tanina [taˈɲina] is a village in the administrative district of Gmina Herby, within Lubliniec County, Silesian Voivodeship, in southern Poland.
