= Lutrowskie =

- Village
- Location within Poland
- Coordinates: 50°57′N 18°40′E
- Country: Poland
- Voivodeship: Silesian
- County: Kłobuck
- Gmina: Krzepice
- Population: 265

Lutrowskie [luˈtrɔfskʲɛ] is a village in the administrative district of Gmina Krzepice, within Kłobuck County, Silesian Voivodeship, in southern Poland.
