= Herby =

- Village
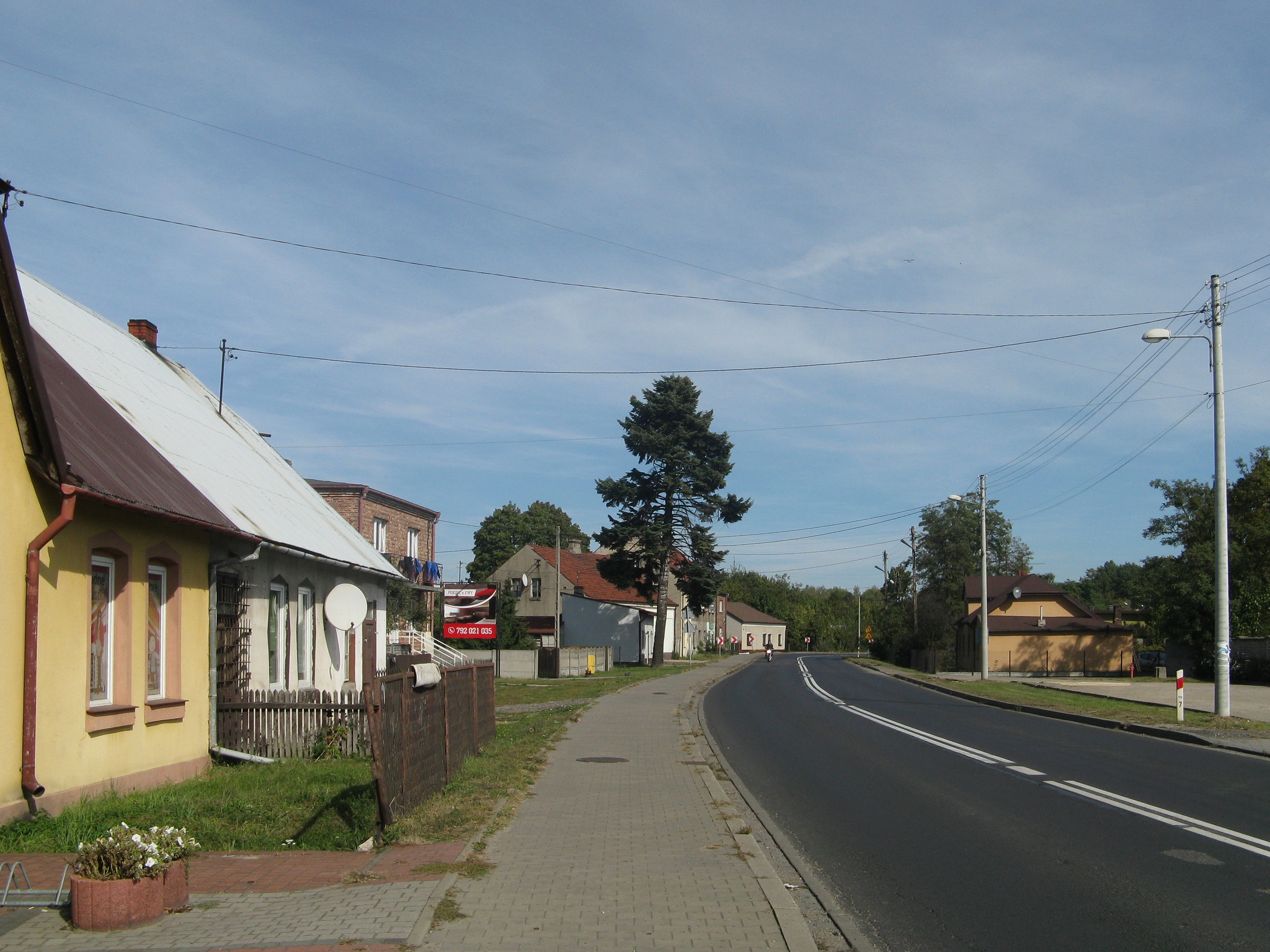

- Location within Poland
- Coordinates: 50°45′10″N 18°53′15″E
- Country: Poland
- Voivodeship: Silesian
- County: Lubliniec
- Gmina: Herby
- Population: 2,350 (As of February 2,015)

Herby [ˈxɛrbɨ] is a village in Lubliniec County, Silesian Voivodeship, in southern Poland. It is the seat of the gmina (administrative district) called Gmina Herby.

It was devastated by an F3 tornado on 15 August 2008. Herby has a population of 2134, according to the Population Census 2021.
