= Gmina Herby =

Gmina Herby Herby Commune
- Gmina
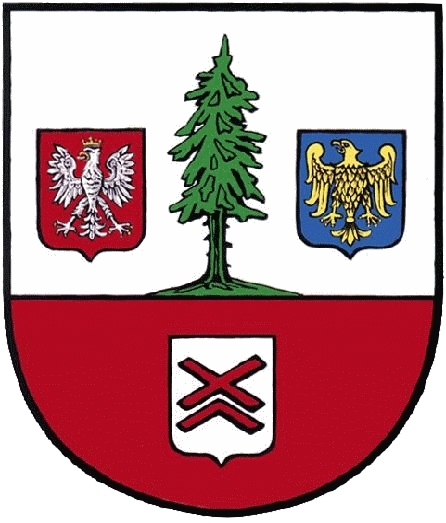
- Coat of arms
- Interactive map of Gmina Herby
- Coordinates (Herby): 50°45′10″N 18°53′15″E
- Country: Poland
- Voivodeship: Silesian
- County: Lubliniec
- Seat: Herby

Area
  - Total: 50.47 km^{2} (19.49 sq mi)

Population (2019-06-30)
  - Total: 6,808
  - Density: 134.9/km^{2} (349.4/sq mi)
- Website: http://www.herby.pl

Gmina Herby is a rural gmina (municipality) in Lubliniec County, Silesian Voivodeship, in southern Poland. Its seat is the village of Herby, which lies approximately 17 kilometres (11 mi) north-east of Lubliniec and 57 km (35 mi) north of the regional capital Katowice. Until 1993 it also included the area which now makes up Gmina Boronów.

The gmina covers an area of 50.47 square kilometres (19.5 sq mi), and as of 2019 its total population was 6,808.

The gmina contains part of the protected area called Upper Liswarta Forests Landscape Park.

== History ==
For several centuries, Herby lay on the border between Lesser Poland and Silesia. Therefore, since the 13th century, one part of it belonged to the Holy Roman Empire and overlapped with the Kingdom of Prussia. The other part remained in Poland during the era of the Jagiellons and the Polish–Lithuanian Commonwealth. In the late 18th and 19th centuries, this part belonged to the Russian Empire.

== Villages ==
Gmina Herby contains the villages and settlements of Brasowe, Braszczok, Chwostek, Cztery Kopy, Drapacz, Głąby, Hadra, Herby, Kalina, Kierzki, Kolonia Lisów, Łebki, Łęg, Lisów, Mochała, Niwy, Oleksiki, Olszyna, Otrzęsie, Pietrzaki, Piłka, Pustkowie, Tanina and Turza.

== Neighbouring gminas ==
Gmina Herby is bordered by the gminas of Blachownia, Boronów, Ciasna, Kochanowice, Konopiska, Koszęcin, Przystajń and Wręczyca Wielka.

== Traffic ==
Herby is situated at the crossing of the Polish Coal Trunk-Line and the relation Częstochowa – Opole.
