= Lubliniec County =

Lubliniec County Powiat lubliniecki
- County
- Coat of arms

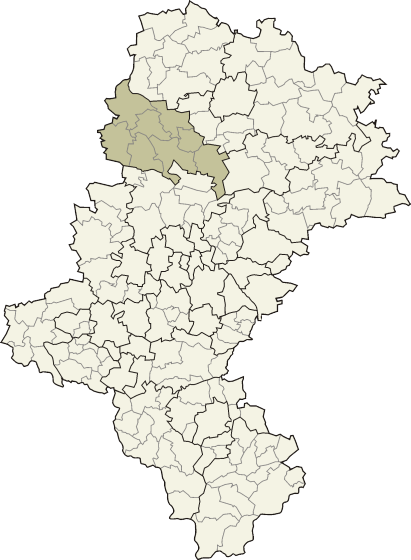
- Location within the voivodeship

- Division into gminas
- Coordinates (Lubliniec): 50°41′N 18°41′E
- Country: Poland
- Voivodeship: Silesian
- Seat: Lubliniec
- Gminas: Total 8 (incl. 1 urban): Lubliniec; Gmina Boronów; Gmina Ciasna; Gmina Herby; Gmina Kochanowice; Gmina Koszęcin; Gmina Pawonków; Gmina Woźniki

Area
  - Total: 822.13 km^{2} (317.43 sq mi)

Population (2019-06-30)
  - Total: 76,470
  - Density: 93.01/km^{2} (240.9/sq mi)
  - Urban: 28,089
  - Rural: 48,381
- Car plates: SLU
- Website: www.lubliniec.starostwo.gov.pl

Lubliniec County (Polish: powiat lubliniecki) is a unit of territorial administration and local government (powiat) in Silesian Voivodeship, southern Poland. It came into being on January 1, 1999, as a result of the Polish local government reforms passed in 1998. Its administrative seat and largest town is Lubliniec, which lies 54 kilometres (34 mi) north-west of the regional capital Katowice. The only other town in the county is Woźniki, lying 45 km (28 mi) north-east of Lubliniec.

The county covers an area of 822.13 square kilometres (317.4 sq mi). As of 2019 its total population is 76,470, out of which the population of Lubliniec is 23,784, that of Woźniki is 4,305, and the rural population is 48,381.

== Neighbouring counties ==
Lubliniec County is bordered by Kłobuck County to the north-east, Częstochowa County and Myszków County to the east, Tarnowskie Góry County to the south, Strzelce County to the south-west, and Olesno County to the north-west.

== Administrative divisions ==
The county is subdivided into eight gminas (one urban, one urban-rural and six rural). These are listed in the following table, in descending order of population.

Gmina	Type	Area (km^{2})	Population (2019)	Seat
Lubliniec	urban	89.8	23,784	
Gmina Koszęcin	rural	129.0	11,842	Koszęcin
Gmina Woźniki	urban-rural	127.0	9,598	Woźniki
Gmina Ciasna	rural	134.2	7,467	Ciasna
Gmina Kochanowice	rural	79.7	6,925	Kochanowice
Gmina Herby	rural	50.5	6,808	Herby
Gmina Pawonków	rural	118.7	6,630	Pawonków
Gmina Boronów	rural	56.0	3,416	Boronów

== Twin regions ==
- Lörrach (district), Germany
