= Okrąglik =

Okrąglik may refer to the following places:

- Okrąglik, Masovian Voivodeship (east-central Poland)
- Okrąglik, Silesian Voivodeship (south Poland)
- Okrąglik, Lubliniec County in Silesian Voivodeship (south Poland)
