= Heinrich Schwarz (politician) =

German-Prussian politician

Heinrich Schwarz was a Prussian politician. Member of Landtag from 1849 to 1852. Official in Lubsza region from 1839 till his death. Highly respected by both Catholic Polish and Protestant German citizens of the region.
