= Lubliniec =

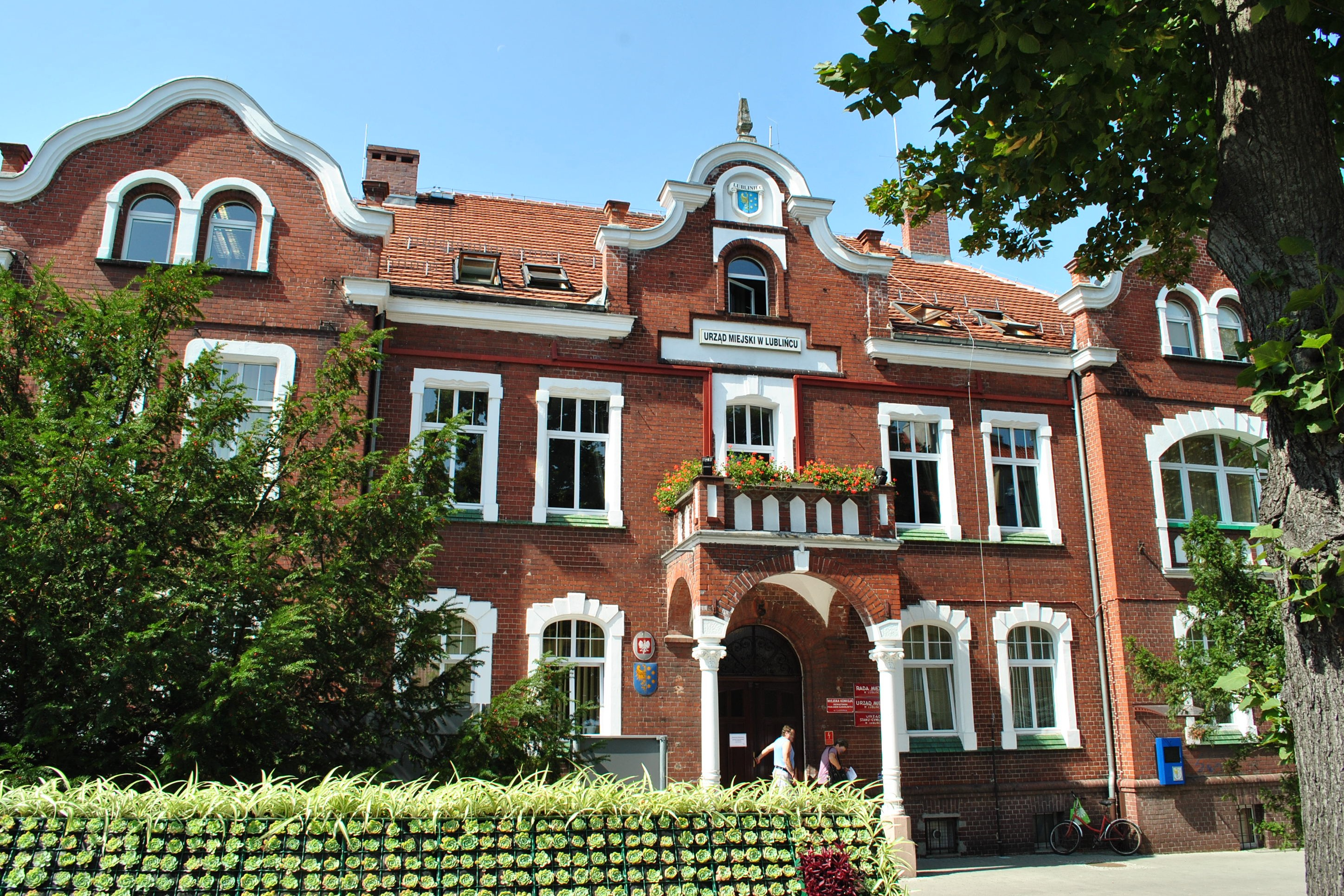
- Municipal Office

- Flag Coat of arms
- Motto(s): Lubliniec miasto zielonych klimatów Lubliniec town of green vibes
- Location within Poland Location within Silesian Voivodeship
- Coordinates: 50°41′N 18°41′E
- Country: Poland
- Voivodeship: Silesian
- County: Lubliniec
- Gmina: Lubliniec (urban gmina)
- Established: 1270
- Town rights: 1272

Government
  - Mayor: Edward Maniura

Area
  - Total: 89.4 km^{2} (34.5 sq mi)
- Elevation: 260 m (850 ft)

Population (2024-12-31)
  - Total: 23,245
  - Density: 260/km^{2} (673/sq mi)
- Time zone: UTC+1 (CET)
  - Summer (DST): UTC+2 (CEST)
- Postal code: 42-700 to 42-715
- Area code: +48 34
- Car plates: SLU
- Website: http://www.lubliniec.pl

Lubliniec (Polish pronunciation: [lubˈliɲɛt͡s], Silesian: Lublini'c, German: Lublinitz) is a town in southern Poland with 23,245 inhabitants (2024). It is the capital of Lubliniec County, part of Silesian Voivodeship. Historically part of Upper Silesia.

== Geography ==
Lubliniec is situated in the north of the historic Upper Silesia region at the rim of the Upper Silesian Industrial Region, about 60 km (37 mi) northwest of Katowice. It is an important rail hub, with two major lines crossing there – east-west (from Częstochowa to Opole) and south–north (from Katowice to Poznań) – and a site of light and chemical industry. The surrounding area is characterized by extended forests (Lasy Lublinieckie), including the Upper Liswarta Forests Landscape Park north of the town.

== History ==
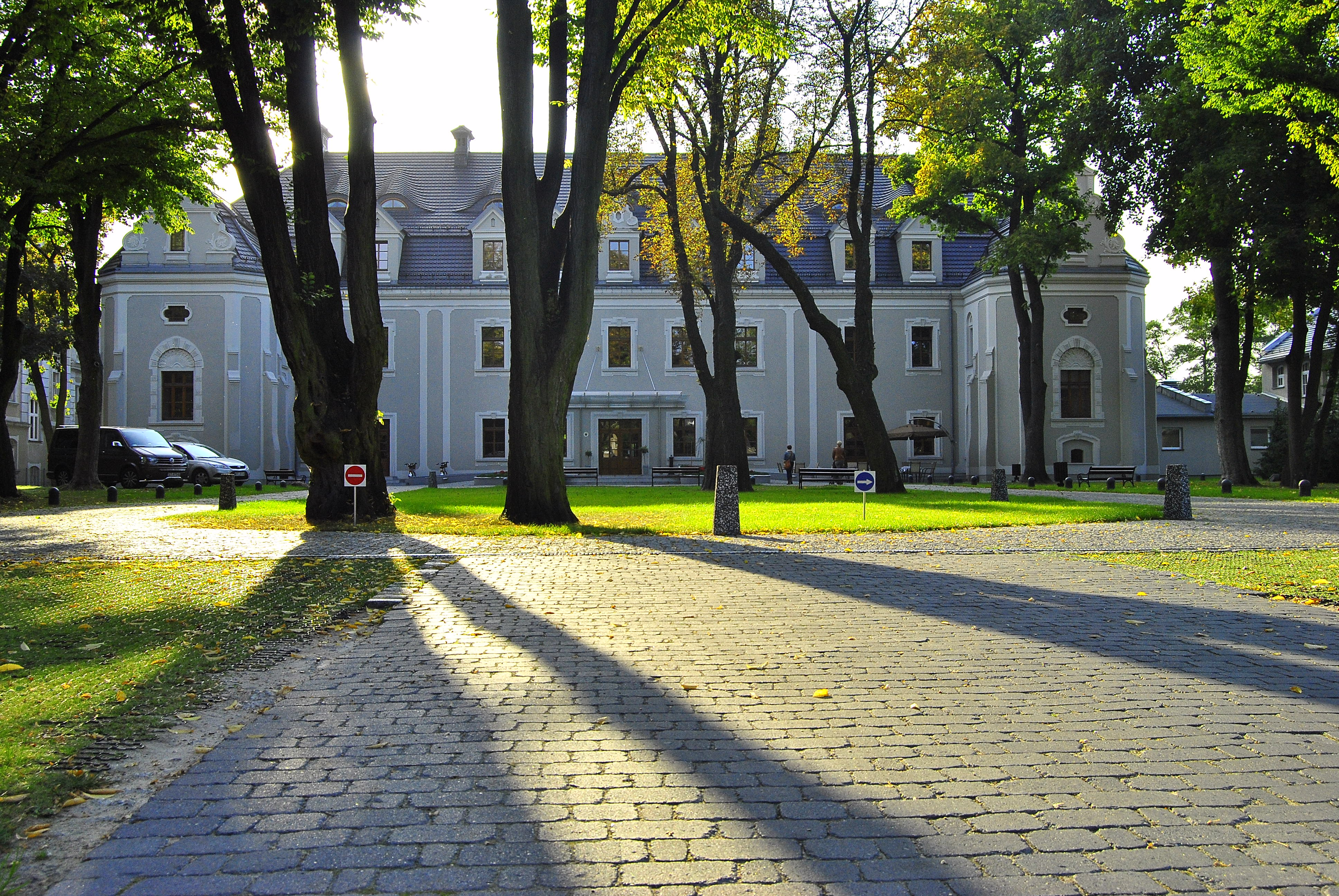
Baroque castle, originally built in the Middle Ages as the residence of the Piast dynasty

Lubliniec was established about 1270 by the Piast duke Władysław of Opole on the road leading from his residence Opole to Kraków. It was part of the Duchy of Opole within fragmented Piast-ruled Poland. According to old folk tradition the name comes from the Polish sentence lubi mi się tu kościół i miasto budować, which refers to the erection of the church and the town by Duke Władysław. In medieval Polish documents the town appeared under the names Lubie, Lublin and Lubin, and then morphed to Lubliniec for distinction, as mentioned by 15th-century Polish chronicler Jan Długosz. Under the name Lubliniec it was mentioned in a 1612 Polish poem Officina ferraria, abo huta y warstat z kuźniami szlachetnego dzieła żelaznego by Baroque poet Walenty Roździeński. By the turn of the 13th to the 14th century it had obtained the status of a town according to Magdeburg Law by Władysław's son and successor Duke Bolko I. He had been one of the first Silesian dukes to become a Bohemian vassal in 1289, however it remained under the rule of the local branch of the Polish Piast dynasty until 1532. The Piast dukes erected a castle in Lubliniec. Duke Jan II the Good granted the citizens many privileges, including brewing and market rights as well as the permit to form guilds.

Upon Jan's death in 1532, Lubliniec with the Duchy of Opole fell as a reverted fief to the Lands of the Bohemian Crown, which since 1526 were ruled by the Austrian House of Habsburg. In 1638 the town was visited by King of Poland Władysław IV Vasa. In 1645 along with the Duchy of Opole and Racibórz it returned to Poland under the House of Vasa, and in 1655 the Black Madonna of Częstochowa was briefly hidden at the local castle by the Poles during the Swedish invasion of Poland. In 1666 the town fell to the Habsburg monarchy again, until it was annexed with most of Silesia by the Prussian king Frederick the Great in 1742.

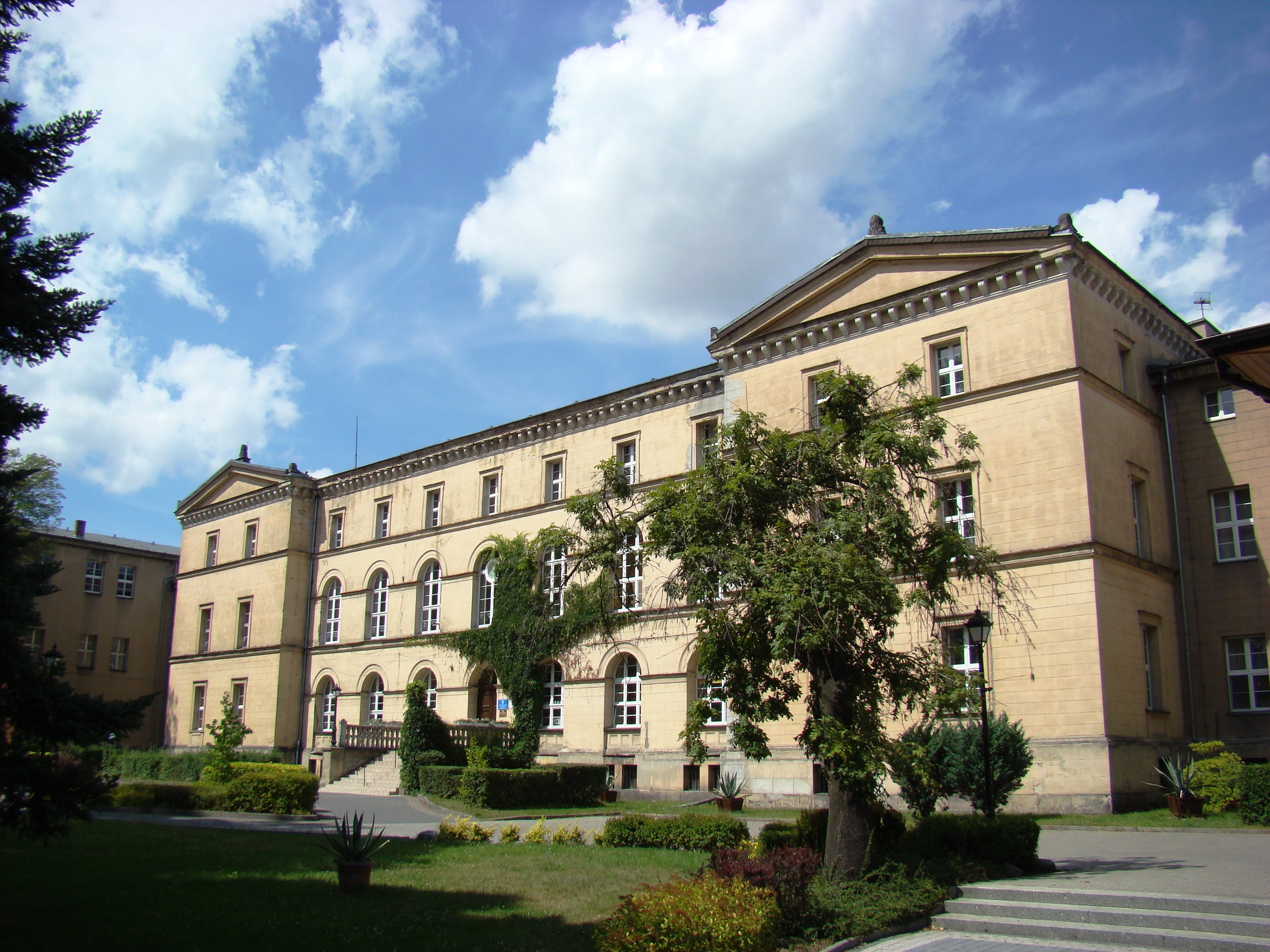
Franciszek Grotowski's orphanage, today a primary school

The town was an important center of Polish Bar Confederates, and in the 1770s it was visited several times by Kazimierz Pułaski, one of the Confederates' military commanders and soon-to-be hero of the American Revolutionary War. In the late 18th century the town was held by the Polish noble Grotowski family. In 1812 Franciszek Grotowski founded an institute, which purpose was to take care of orphans and provide them with education, and a new orphanage was built in 1848. To this day the facade of the former orphanage is decorated with a relief of the Łodzia coat of arms of the Grotowski family. The town was a center of Polish resistance against Germanisation policies. 19th-century Polish publicist, activist and poet Józef Lompa printed many of his works in the town. In the 19th century the county's population remained overwhelmingly Polish and Catholic by confession. In 1871 the town became part of Germany. The first railway reached it by 1884. The former castle of Lubliniec was converted into a hospital for the poor in 1893, then altered to a psychiatric hospital in 1895/96.

According to the 1910 German census, in the city of Lublinitz 59% of the population reported German as their sole mother tongue while 25% reported Polish, with the remainder reporting as bilingual; in the entire district of Lublinitz including outlying villages, the figures were 15% German-speaking and 79% Polish-speaking. After World War I, Poland regained independence in 1918, and the region was divided according to the Upper Silesia plebiscite in 1921, whereby 88% of the Lublinitz citizens voted for continuance in the German Weimar Republic, while 47% of the citizens of the entire county voted to join the reborn Polish state. Nevertheless, after Wojciech Korfanty had initiated the Third Silesian Uprising from the nearby village of Czarny Las, it was incorporated into the Silesian Voivodeship of the Second Polish Republic and became a border town. In the interbellum the Polish 74th Infantry Regiment was stationed in Lubliniec.

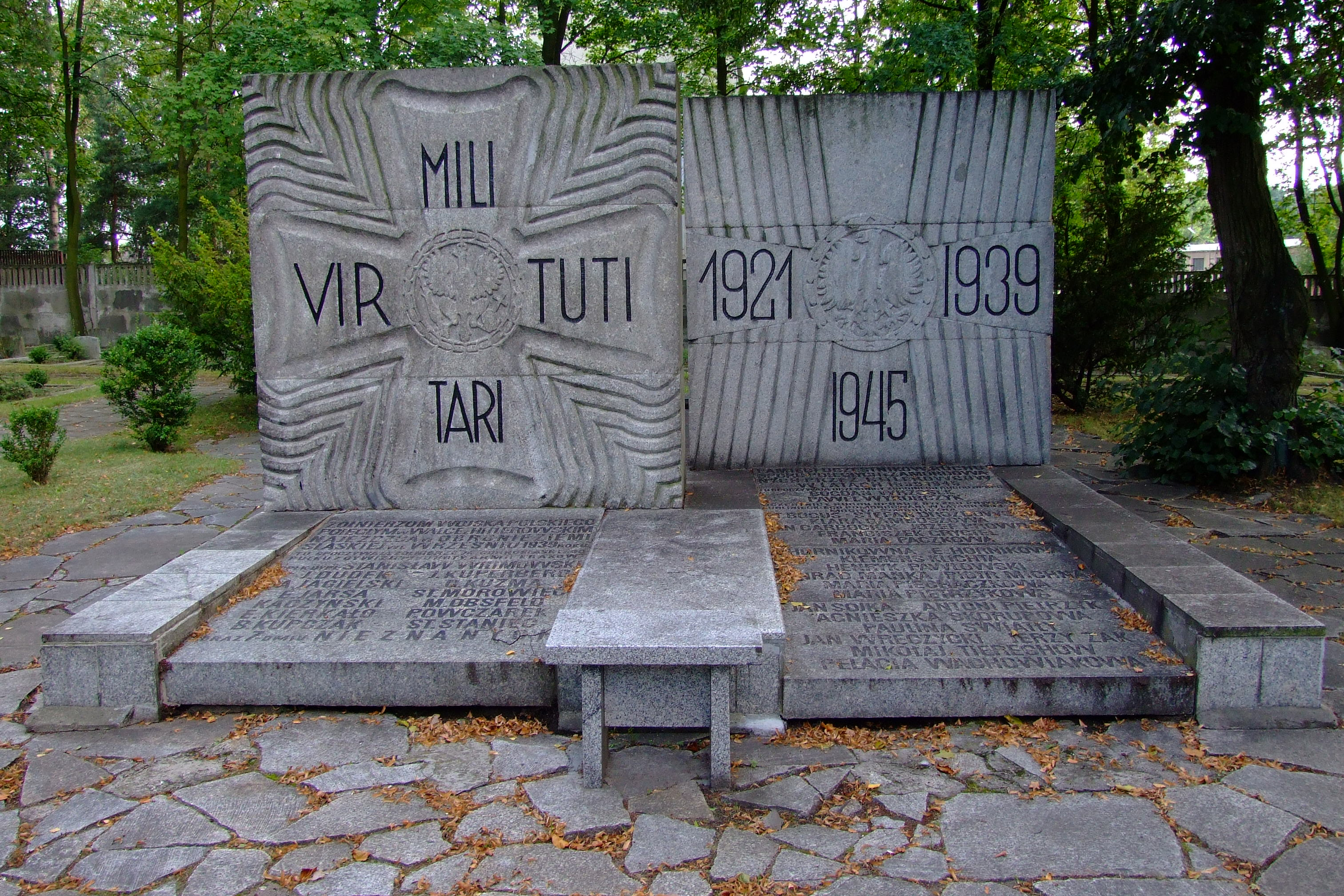
Monument to Polish insurgents of 1921 and Polish soldiers from World War II

Again occupied in the 1939 invasion of Poland by Nazi Germany during World War II (and renamed Loben, 1941–45). During the German occupation, the Polish population was subjected to mass arrests, imprisonment, deportations to Nazi concentration camps and executions. On September 8, 1939, the Einsatzgruppe II entered the town to commit various crimes against Poles. 180 civilian defenders were murdered immediately by the invading Germans in September 1939, in accordance with Adolf Hitler's orders to execute Polish "partisans" immediately. Soon after capturing the city, the Germans took over the local psychiatric hospital, and several hundred children were murdered there during the occupation as part of the Aktion T4. There were also cases in which the killed children's brains were used for medical research by the Germans in Wrocław, as mentioned by German doctor Elisabeth Hecker, who was in charge of the hospital since 1941. The Germans also established and operated a Nazi prison in the town, and the E609 forced labour subcamp of the Stalag VIII-B/344 prisoner-of-war camp in the present-day district of Kokotek. Teachers from Lubliniec were among Polish teachers imprisoned and murdered in concentration camps. The area was conquered by the Red Army in January 1945 in the course of the Vistula–Oder Offensive, and then restored to Poland.

From 1975 to 1998, Lubliniec was administratively located in the Częstochowa Voivodeship.

== Sport ==
The local football team is Sparta Lubliniec. It competes in the lower leagues.

== Notable people ==
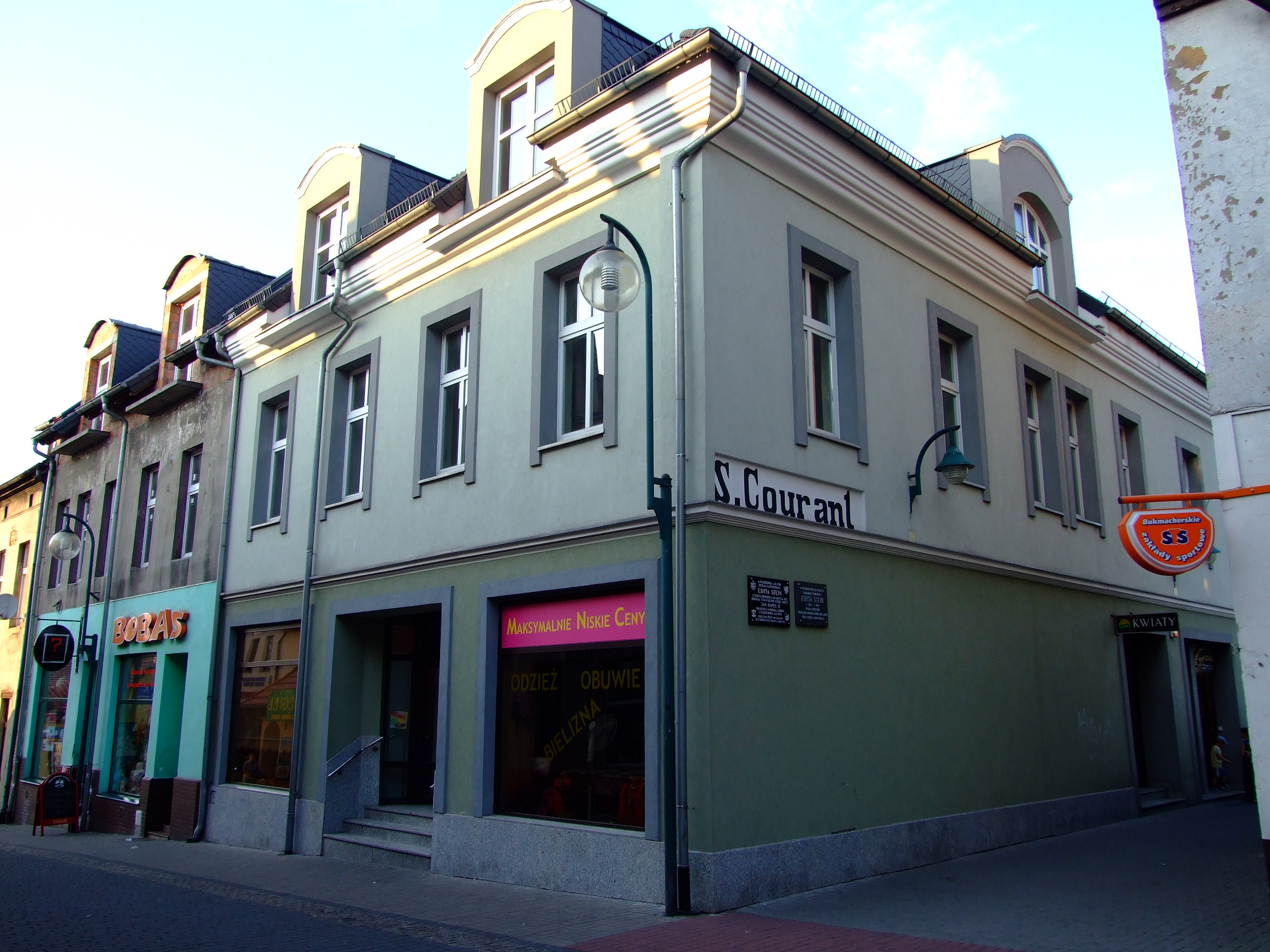
Heritage house of the Courants, grandparents of St Edith (Św. Edyta)

- Hans Heinrich Lammers (27 May 1879 – 4 January 1962) was a German jurist and prominent Nazi politician. From 1933 until 1945 he served as Chief of the Reich Chancellery under Adolf Hitler.
- Richard Courant (1888–1972), mathematician; his cousin Edith Stein often visited the house of her maternal grandparents Courant near the rynek, today the site of a small museum.
- Eva Gabriele Reichmann (1897–1998), historian
- Zygmunt Anczok (born 1946), footballer
- Michael Kutzop (born 1955), footballer
- Alexander Famulla (born 1960), footballer
- Major General Roman Polko (born 1962), served in the Polish 1st Special Commando Regiment at Lubliniec
- Max Kolonko (born 1965), journalist
- Andrzej Grzesik (born 1967), politician
- Anna Świątczak (born 1977), pop singer

== Twin towns – sister cities ==
Lubliniec is twinned with:

- Bánovce nad Bebravou, Slovakia
- Kiskunmajsa, Hungary
- Kravaře, Czech Republic
- Łowicz, Poland
- Reda, Poland
- Teruel, Spain
