= Sośnica =

Sośnica may refer to the following places:

- Sośnica, Lower Silesian Voivodeship (south-west Poland)
- Sośnica, Subcarpathian Voivodeship (south-east Poland)
- Sośnica, Greater Poland Voivodeship (west-central Poland)
- Sośnica, Silesian Voivodeship (south Poland)
- Sośnica, Warmian-Masurian Voivodeship (north Poland)
- Sośnica, West Pomeranian Voivodeship (north-west Poland)
- Sośnica, Gliwice, district of Gliwice (south Poland)
- Sośnica, Polish name for Sassnitz (north-east Germany)
- Sośnica, Polish name for Sosnytsia (north Ukraine)
