= Gmina Woźniki =

Gmina Woźniki Woźniki Commune
- Gmina
- Coat of arms
- Interactive map of Gmina Woźniki
- Coordinates (Woźniki): 50°35′N 19°3′E
- Country: Poland
- Voivodeship: Silesian
- County: Lubliniec
- Seat: Woźniki

Area
  - Total: 127 km^{2} (49 sq mi)

Population (2019-06-30)
  - Total: 9,598
  - Density: 75.6/km^{2} (196/sq mi)
  - Urban: 4,305
  - Rural: 5,293
- Website: http://www.wozniki.pl

Gmina Woźniki is an urban-rural gmina (administrative district) in Lubliniec County, Silesian Voivodeship, in southern Poland. Its seat is the town of Woźniki, which lies approximately 45 kilometres (28 mi) east of Lubliniec and 60 km (37 mi) north of the regional capital Katowice.

The gmina covers an area of 127 square kilometres (49.0 sq mi), and as of 2019 its total population is 9,598.

The gmina contains part of the protected area called Upper Liswarta Forests Landscape Park.

== Villages ==
Apart from the town of Woźniki, Gmina Woźniki contains the villages and settlements of Babienica, Czarny Las, Dyrdy, Kamienica, Kamieńskie Młyny, Kolonia Woźnicka, Ligota Woźnicka, Lubsza, Mzyki, Niwy, Okrąglik, Piasek, Psary and Sośnica.

== Neighbouring gminas ==
Gmina Woźniki is bordered by the towns of Kalety, Miasteczko Śląskie and Tarnowskie Góry, and by the gminas of Kamienica Polska, Konopiska, Koszęcin, Koziegłowy and Starcza.

== Twin towns – sister cities ==
Gmina Woźniki is twinned with:

- Kravaře, Czech Republic
- Lisková, Slovakia
