= Kolonia Woźnicka =

- Settlement
- Location within Poland
- Coordinates: 50°31′N 19°1′E
- Country: Poland
- Voivodeship: Silesian
- County: Lubliniec
- Gmina: Woźniki

Kolonia Woźnicka [kɔˈlɔɲa vɔʑˈnit͡ska] is a settlement in the administrative district of Gmina Woźniki, within Lubliniec County, Silesian Voivodeship, in southern Poland.
