= Niwy, Gmina Woźniki =

Niwy
- Village
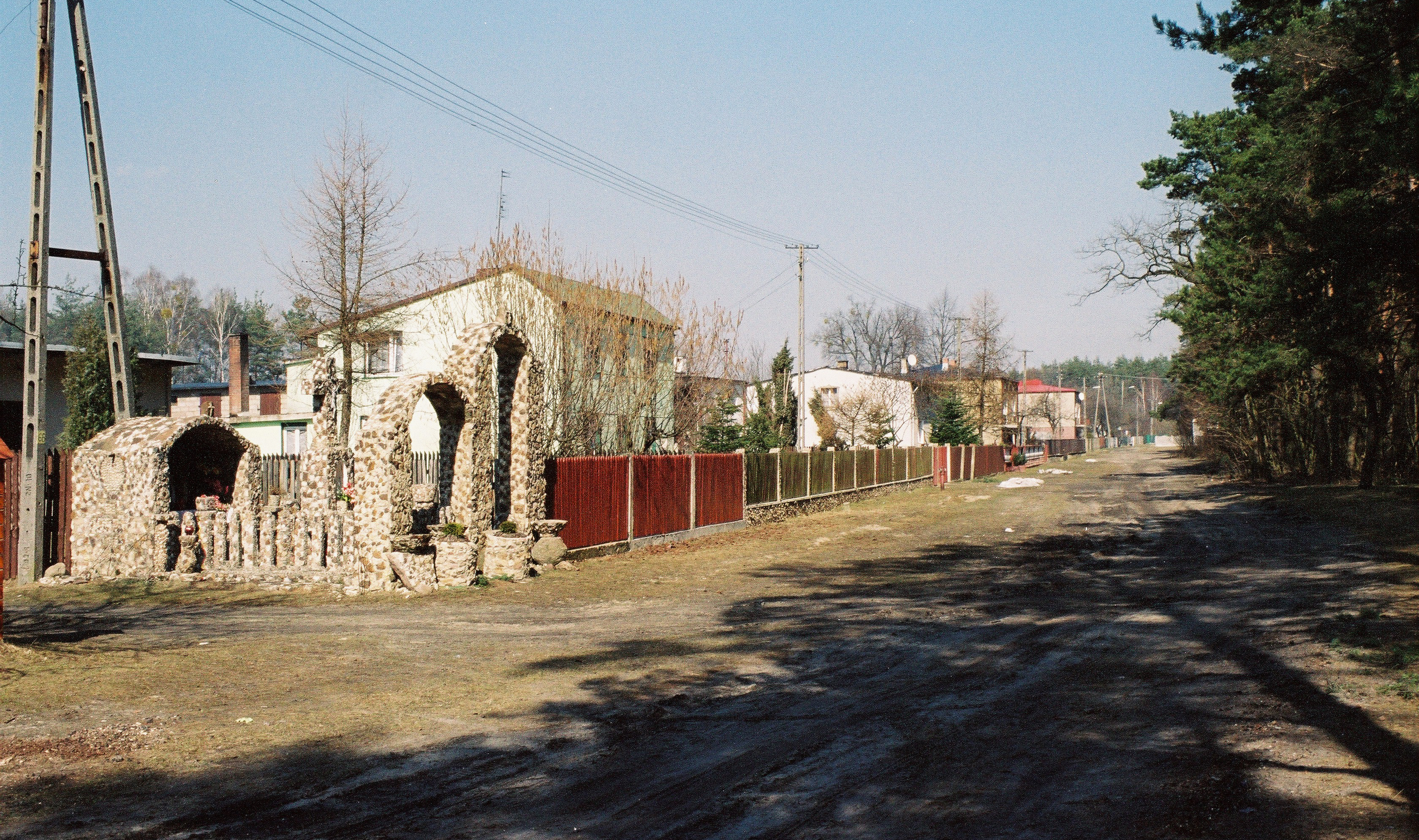

- Location within Poland
- Coordinates: 50°39′41″N 18°58′54″E
- Country: Poland
- Voivodeship: Silesian
- County: Lubliniec
- Gmina: Woźniki
- Population: 25

Niwy [ˈnivɨ] is a village in the administrative district of Gmina Woźniki, within Lubliniec County, Silesian Voivodeship, in southern Poland.

The village has a population of 25.
