= Alexander Famulla =

Polish footballer

Personal information
- Full name: Alexander Marian Famulla
- Birth name: Aleksander Marian Famuła
- Date of birth: 20 September 1960 (age 66)
- Place of birth: Lubliniec, Poland
- Height: 1.90 m (6 ft 3 in)
- Position: Goalkeeper

Youth career
- 1975–1979: Sparta Lubliniec

Senior career*
Years	Team	Apps	(Gls)
1979–1981	Sparta Lubliniec		
1981–1983	Górnik Zabrze	60	(0)
1983–1986	SG Heidelberg-Kirchheim		
1986–1992	Karlsruher SC	150	(0)
1992	FC 08 Homburg	9	(0)
1993–1994	SG Heidelberg-Kirchheim		
1999–2000	VfB Leimen		

International career
1982	Poland U21	1	(0)
- * Club domestic league appearances and goals

Alexander Marian Famulla (born Aleksander Marian Famuła; 20 September 1960) is a Polish former professional footballer who played as goalkeeper.

== Honours ==
SG Heidelberg-Kirchheim

- Verbandsliga Nordbaden: 1983–84
