= Dyrdy =

- Village
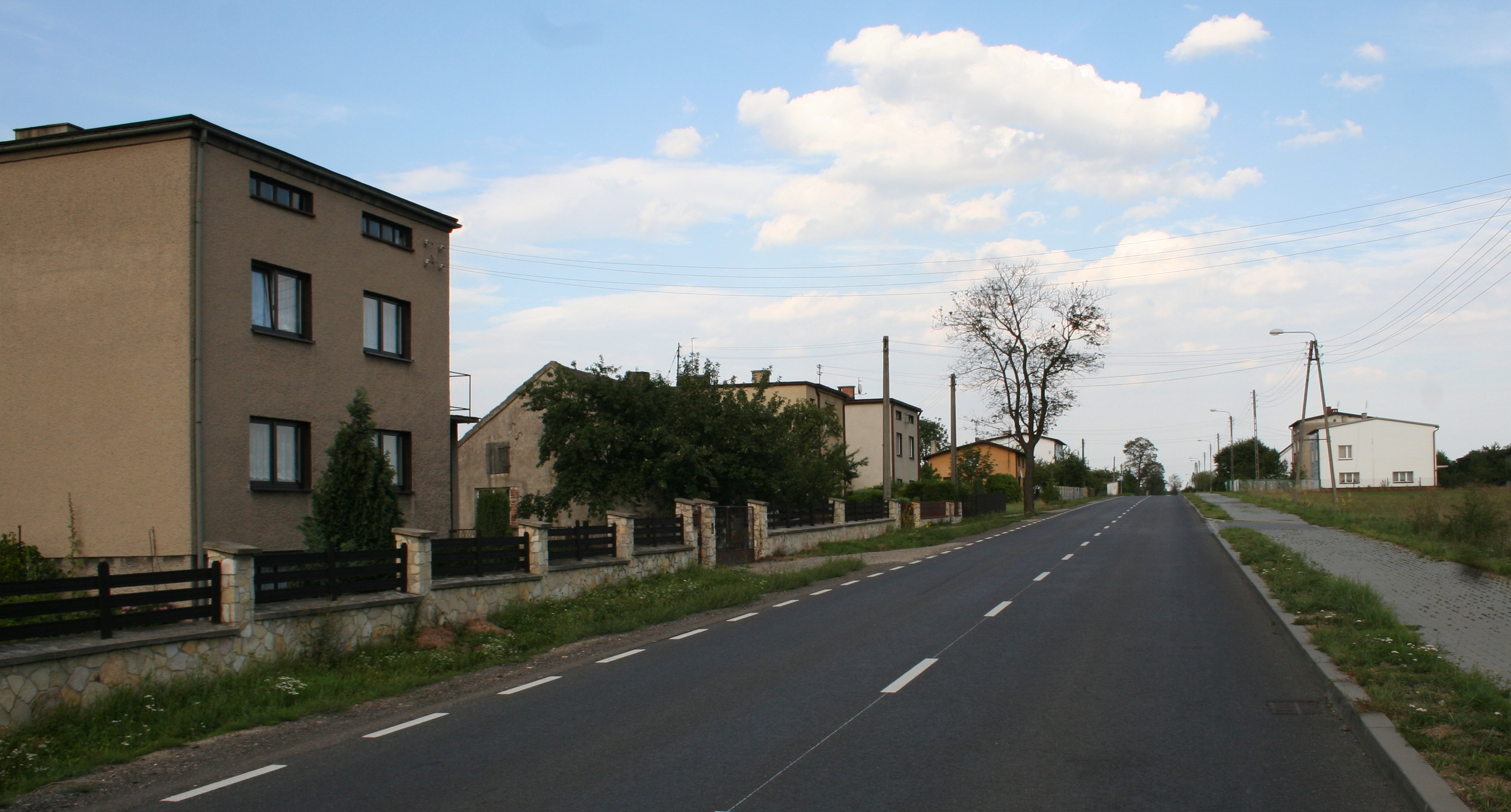
- Houses in Dyrdy

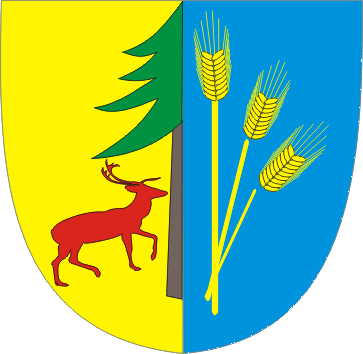
- Coat of arms

- Location within Poland
- Coordinates: 50°34′37″N 18°59′34″E
- Country: Poland
- Voivodeship: Silesian
- County: Lubliniec
- Gmina: Woźniki

Dyrdy [ˈdɨrdɨ] is a village in the administrative district of Gmina Woźniki, within Lubliniec County, Silesian Voivodeship, in southern Poland.
