= Psary, Lubliniec County =

Psary
- Village
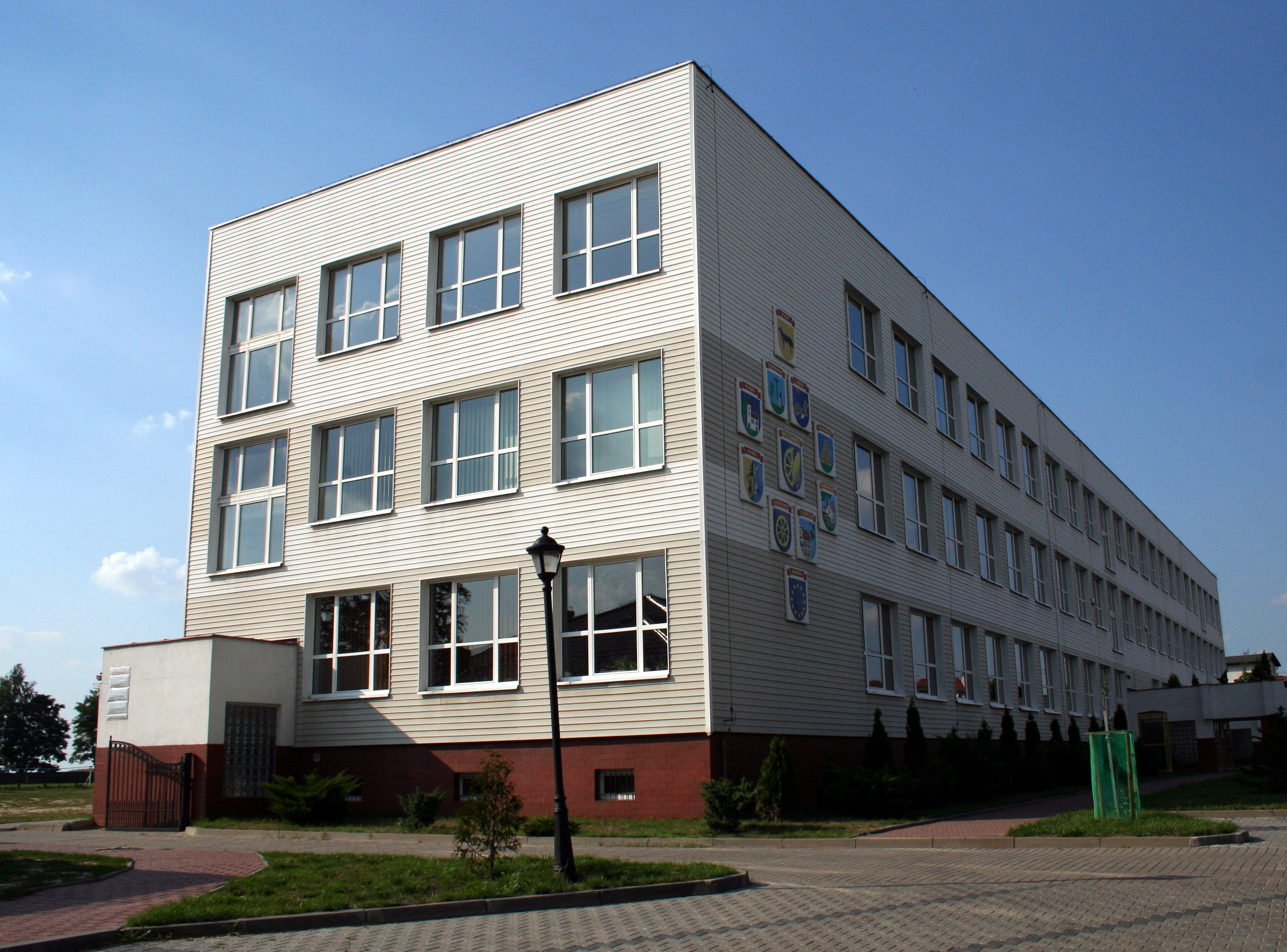
- High school in Psary

- Location within Poland
- Coordinates: 50°36′51″N 18°58′2″E
- Country: Poland
- Voivodeship: Silesian
- County: Lubliniec
- Gmina: Woźniki
- Population: 1,304
- Time zone: UTC+1 (CET)
  - Summer (DST): UTC+2 (CEST)
- Vehicle registration: SLU
- Primary airport: Katowice Airport

Psary [ˈpsarɨ] is a village in the administrative district of Gmina Woźniki, within Lubliniec County, Silesian Voivodeship, in southern Poland.

The name of the village is of Polish origin and comes from the word pies, which means "dog".

== Sports ==
The local football club is Orzeł Psary-Babienica. It competes in the lower leagues.
