= Kamieńskie Młyny =

- Village
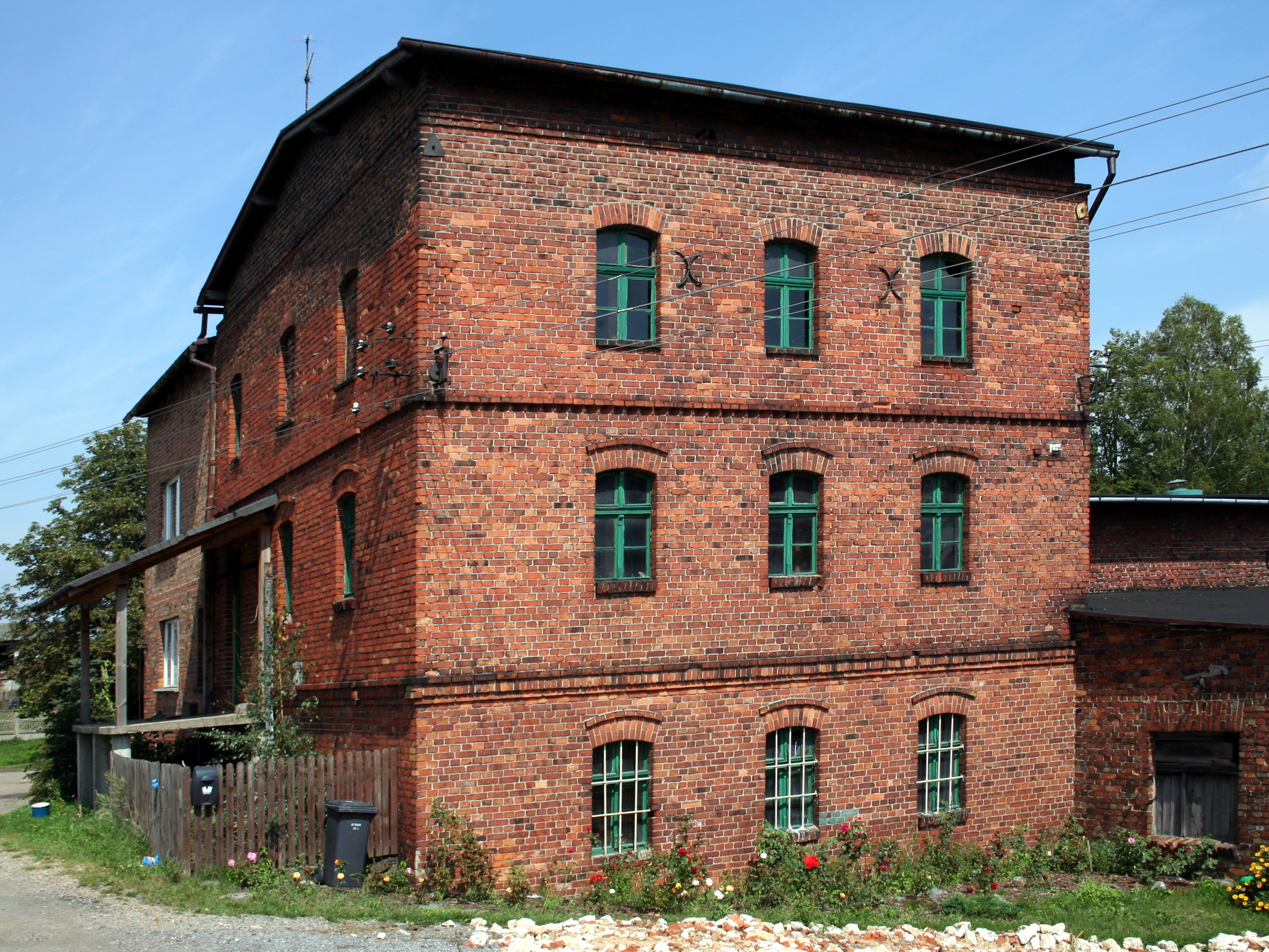
- Mill in Kamieńskie Młyny

- Location within Poland
- Coordinates: 50°38′22″N 19°1′57″E
- Country: Poland
- Voivodeship: Silesian
- County: Lubliniec
- Gmina: Woźniki

Population
  - Total: 415

Kamieńskie Młyny [kaˈmjɛɲskʲɛ ˈmwɨnɨ] is a village in the administrative district of Gmina Woźniki, within Lubliniec County, Silesian Voivodeship, in southern Poland.
