= Piasek, Lubliniec County =

Piasek
- Village
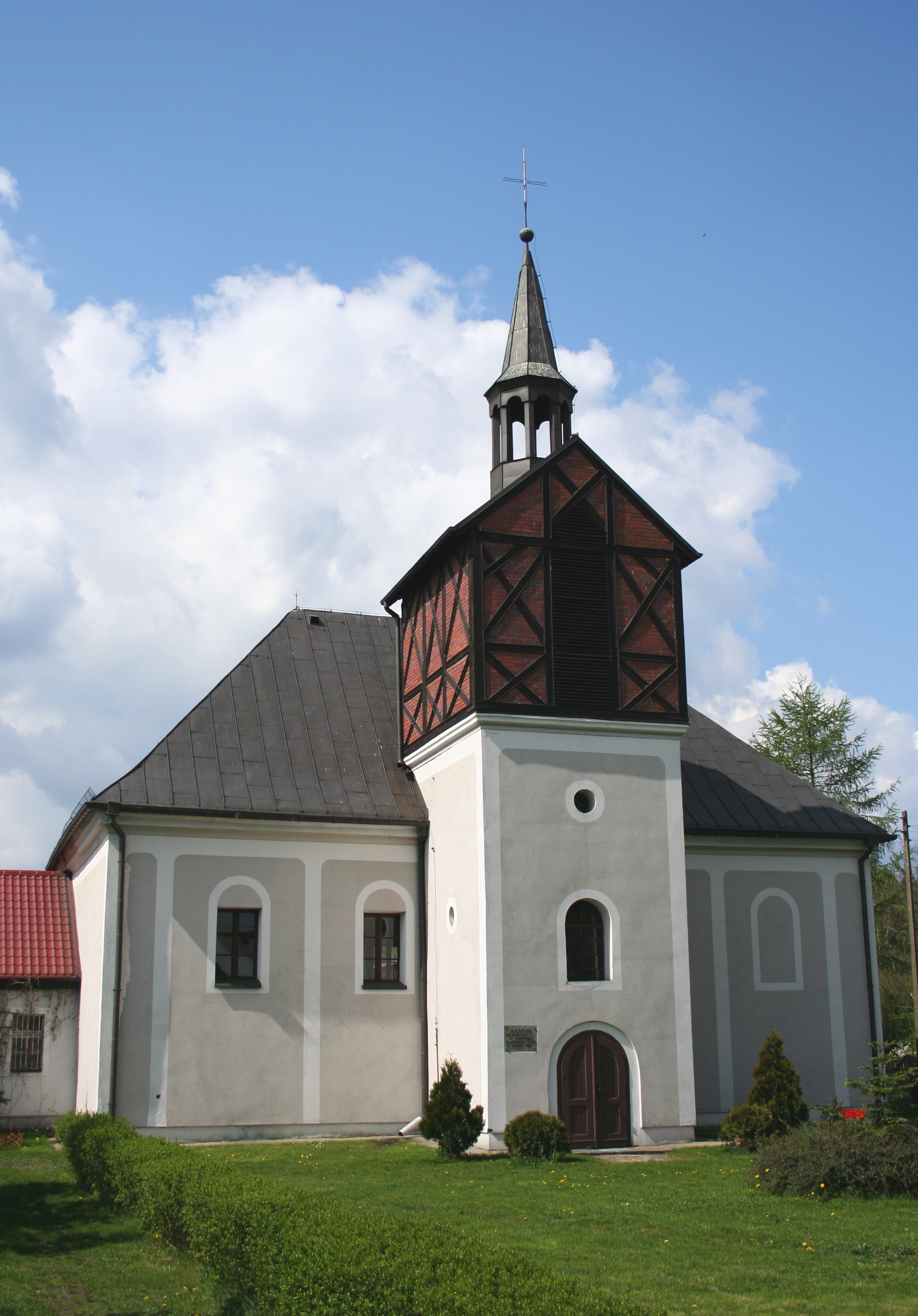
- Protestant church

- Location within Poland
- Coordinates: 50°35′41″N 18°58′04″E
- Country: Poland
- Voivodeship: Silesian
- County: Lubliniec
- Gmina: Woźniki
- Population: 313

Piasek [ˈpjasɛk] is a village in the administrative district of Gmina Woźniki, within Lubliniec County, Silesian Voivodeship, in southern Poland.
