= Ligota Woźnicka =

- Village
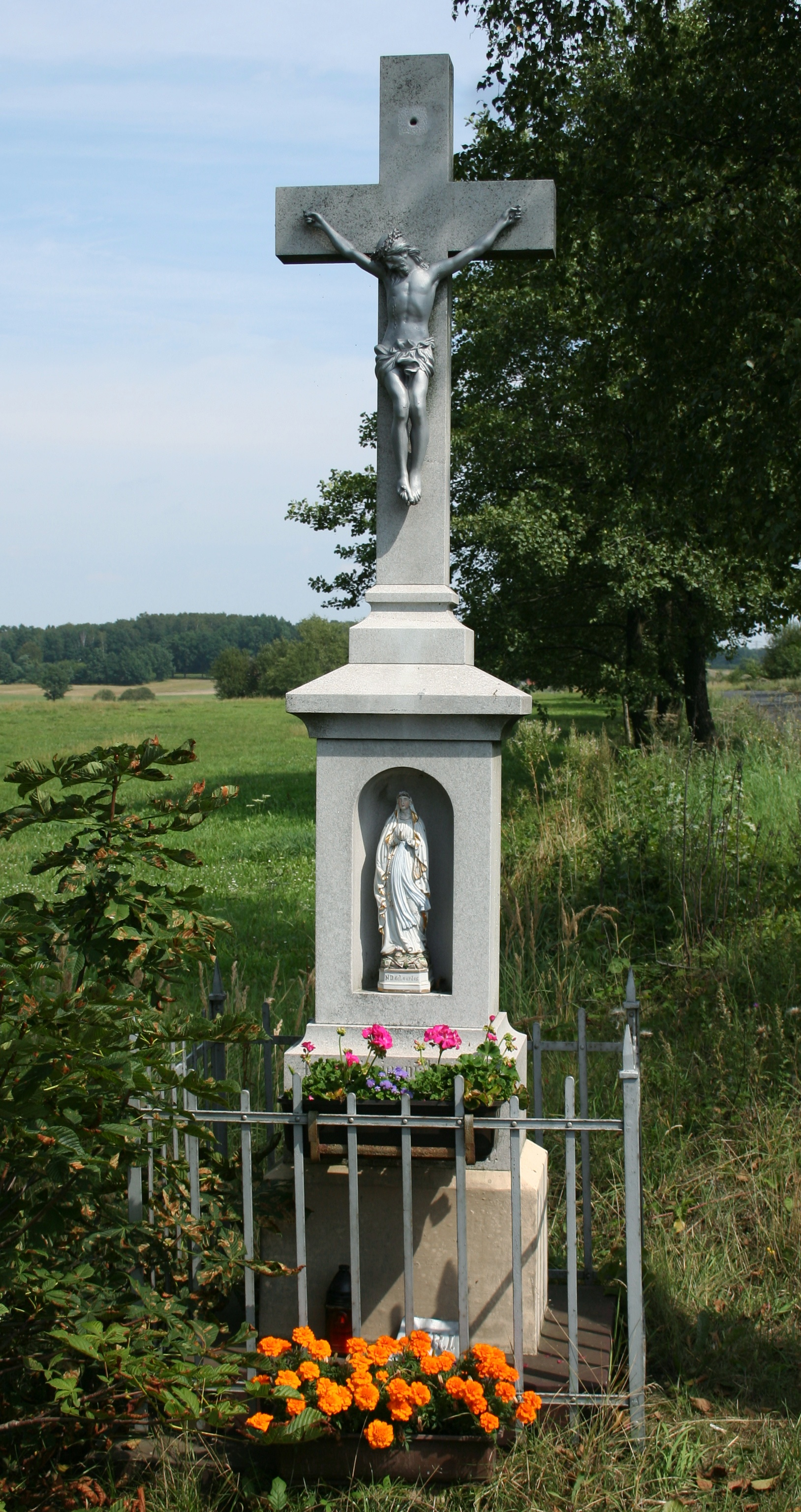
- a chapel in Skrzeszew, Ligota Woźnicka

- Location within Poland
- Coordinates: 50°37′00″N 19°03′02″E
- Country: Poland
- Voivodeship: Silesian
- County: Lubliniec
- Gmina: Woźniki
- Elevation: 55 m (180 ft)
- Population (approx.): 660
- Website: http://www.spligota.republika.pl/hist_miej.htm

Ligota Woźnicka [liˈɡɔta vɔʑˈnit͡ska] is a village in the administrative district of Gmina Woźniki, within Lubliniec County, Silesian Voivodeship, in southern Poland.
