= Edward Maniura =

Polish politician

member of Sejm 2005-2007
- In office 25 September 2005 – 2006

Personal details
- Born: 24 February 1960 (age 66) Lubsza, Poland
- Party: Civic Platform

Edward Makary Maniura (born 24 February 1960 in Lubsza) is a Polish politician. He was elected to the Sejm on 25 September 2005, getting 11,279 votes in 28 Częstochowa district as a candidate from the Civic Platform list.

He was also a member of Sejm 1997-2001 and Sejm 2001-2005.

== See also ==
- Members of Polish Sejm 2005-2007
