= Babienica =

- Village
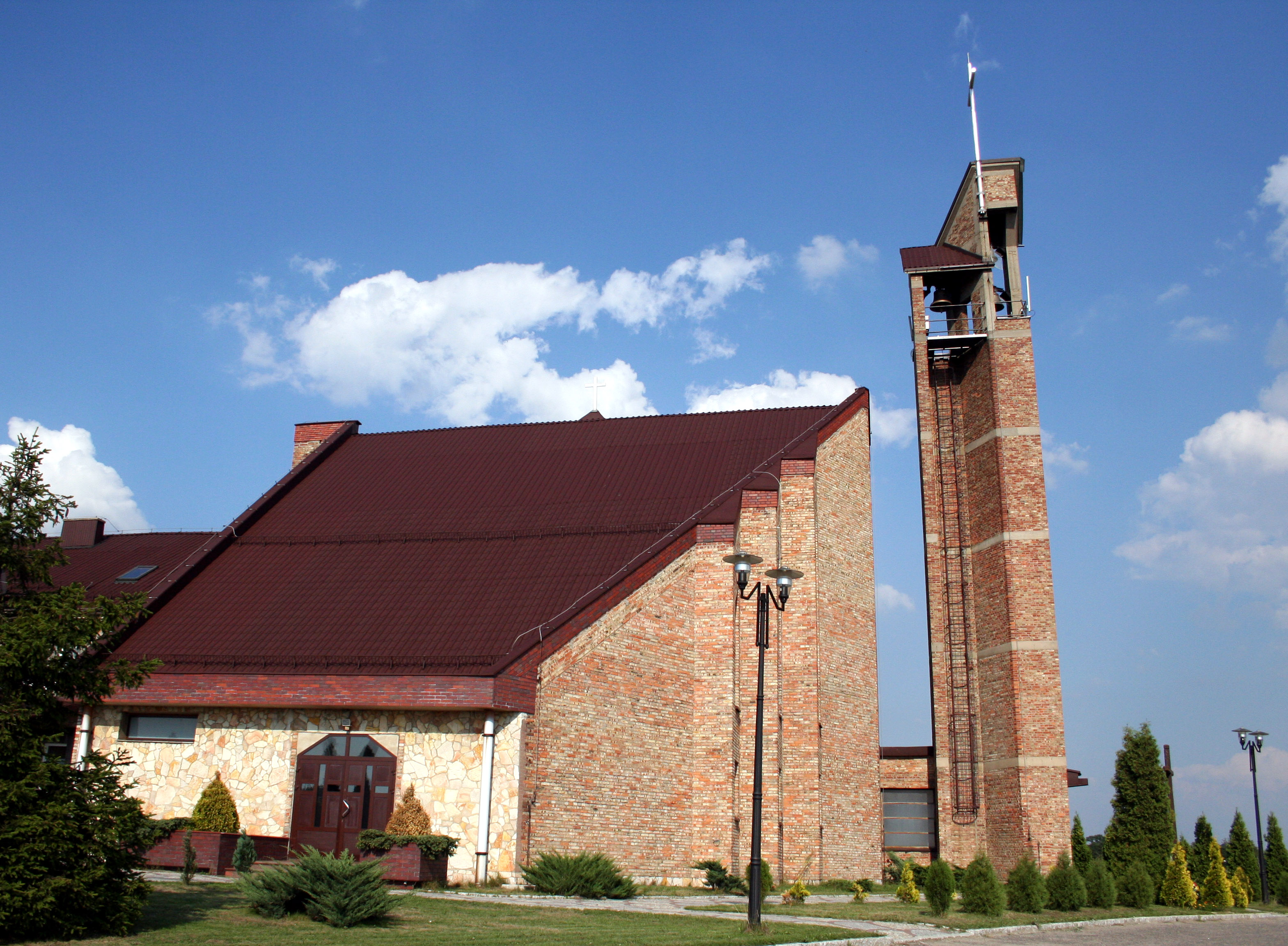
- Church of Saint Stanislaus

- Location within Poland
- Coordinates: 50°37′27″N 18°58′24″E
- Country: Poland
- Voivodeship: Silesian
- County: Lubliniec
- Gmina: Woźniki

Population
  - Total: 997

Babienica [babjɛˈnit͡sa] is a village in the administrative district of Gmina Woźniki, within Lubliniec County, Silesian Voivodeship, in southern Poland.
