= Max Kolonko =

Polish–American journalist (born 1965)

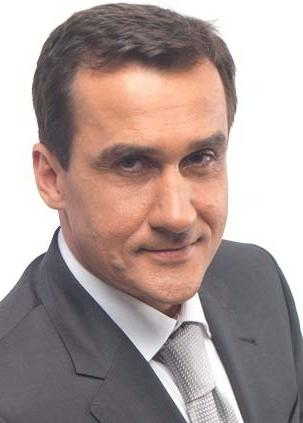
- Max Kolonko in 2008
- Born: Mariusz Max Kolonko; May 6, 1965 (age 61); Lubliniec, Poland
- Education: University of Warsaw, Adam Mickiewicz University in Poznań
- Occupation: Journalist
- Website: MaxTVGO.com

Max Kolonko (born Mariusz Max Kolonko in 1965, Lubliniec, Poland) is a conservative Polish-American journalist, political scientist, author, former White House correspondent and political commentator. He won the Kisiel Prize for journalism in 2015.

== Early life and education ==
He graduated from the First High School in Bydgoszcz, where he was a classmate of Radosław Sikorski, the current Polish Minister of Foreign Affairs. He holds a degree in journalism from the University of Warsaw and in political science from the Adam Mickiewicz University in Poznań.

In the 1980s, while still a student, he hosted the radio program Welcome to Channel 3 ("Zapraszamy do Trójki") on Polish Radio Channel Three Polskie Radio Program III. He also collaborated with Polish Radio, hosting the program Lato z radiem ("Summer with the Radio"). He received the Young Journalists’ Award twice, recognizing him as one of the most talented young journalists of his generation. In 1988, he moved to the United States.

== Journalism career ==
Kolonko was a television correspondent in the United States and wrote two books in the field of journalistic and political commentary. He was a contributor for the American portal The Huffington Post, where his articles were published between May 2011 and December 2017. He is also the founder of MaxTV, an internet-based television platform initially launched on YouTube.

Since 1992, he has been TVP's White House correspondent for Panorama and other TVP news services, operating within the Television Information Agency. From 2001 to 2005, he served as TVP's White House correspondent for Wiadomości. In 1993 he established his own production company, Media 2000, which produced programs and documentary films for broadcasters such as TVP, TV4, TVN, and CBS. In 2001, he provided live coverage from New York for TVP's Channel One following the September 11 attacks on the World Trade Center.

From April 2007, he was the host and producer of the program Discovering America, about the lesser-known aspects of the USA, for TV4. The program's format was created by Kolonko, called by him "hands-on reporting", and based on original material combined with a narrative by the reporter, who participates in the events being covered. Kolonko was the only television reporter who cast an Oscar statuette for Andrzej Wajda in 2003, operated NASA's "Crawler", driving the space shuttle Atlantis to the launch pad at Cape Canaveral, reported twice from the US Space Command NORAD, and put his hands on nuclear buttons.

In 2007–2008, he was the face of a television advertising campaign for an American insurance company Liberty Direct (Liberty Mutual's operations in the Polish market). In 2008, he received two awards (silver and bronze) at the 9th Effie Awards in the Launch and Media House categories for the Liberty Direct advertising campaign.

In May 2008, he became the face of Newsweek's "English at Max" advertising campaign, covering television, radio, internet, outdoor media, and the publisher's titles. Axel Springer Polska: Newsweek, Forbes, Dziennik, Fakt, Auto Świat, TV Kultura and Przegląd Sportowy.

He was a commentator for the 2012 United States presidential election for Onet.pl and the Superstacja Television channel. He hosted the program 15 Minutes Max (Kwadrans na Maxa) on the Superstacja Television channel.

An interview with him titled "Some brat is telling me how to live" ("Jakiś gówniarz mówi mi, jak mam żyć") won the Best of Onet 2012 award for the best article of the year, generating over one million views, more than 3,500 comments, and sparking a discussion about the state of journalism in Poland.

He was invited as an expert on U.S. foreign policy to television networks such as CBS, ABC, and CNN, as well as to the Goethe-Institut in Washington and Berlin (in May 2011, he participated in the conference "Fascination America – Fascination Europe" and he presented a lecture titled From Baby Boomers to Plastic Generation – the coming of age of American youth and their European buddies).

In 2004, a survey by OBOP ranked him among the four most popular journalists in Poland. In August 2008, he was ranked ninth among the most valuable journalists for advertisers in Poland (64th on the list of the most valuable Polish celebrities) by Forbes magazine.

== Books ==
- Odkrywanie Ameryki. Zapiski w Jeepie, Zysk i S-ka, Poznań 2006, ISBN 83-7298-959-1.
- Odkrywanie Ameryki. Zapiski w Jeepie, Media 2000 Communications, New York 2015, ISBN 978-1-63452-623-4.

== Articles ==
- Kolonko, Max (2009). "One Flew Over the Cuckoo's Nest". The Huffington Post.
- Kolonko, Max (2009). "Lech Walesa to Sue Organizers of the 20th Anniversary of Berlin Wall Collapse?". The Huffington Post.
- Kolonko, Max (2010). "The Death of Polish President Resurfaces Old Tragedy". The Huffington Post.
- Kolonko, Max (2010). "The Mystery of Poland's Presidential Plane Crash Deepens". The Huffington Post.
- Kolonko, Max (2011). "Poland and Russia Deadlocked Over Report into Causes of the Polish Air Force One Crash". The Huffington Post.
- Kolonko, Max (2011). "Polanski's Pardon? Not So Fast". The Huffington Post.
- Kolonko, Max (2012). "Facebook Is No Longer Cool". The Huffington Post.
- Kolonko, Max (June 4, 2012). "EURO 2012 Soccer -- Stadiums of Hate?". The Huffington Post.
- Kolonko, Max (March 6, 2014). "Crisis in Ukraine: 10 Things You Should Know". The Huffington Post.

== Awards ==
- twice in the 1980s – Young Journalists’ Award for the Most Talented Journalist of the Younger Generation
- 2001 – Wiktor Award in the category "Most Highly Regarded Journalist, Commentator, and Publicist".
- 2001 – Grand Press Award - Journalist of the Year
- 2008 – Silver Award at the 29th Telly Awards for the documentary "The Shield" about the U.S. Ballistic Missile Defense.
- 2008 – Silver and Bronze Awards at the 9th Effie Awards in the Launch and Media House categories for the Liberty Direct advertising campaign.
- 2009 – Bronze Award at the 10th Effie Awards in the Financial Services category for the advertising campaign "Mariusz Max Kolonko in Poland" – Ogilvy Group.
- 2012 – The interview conducted with him, titled "Some Kid Tells Me How to Live," won the Best of Onet award for Best Article of the Year, generating over one million views, more than 3,500 comments, and sparking a discussion about the level of journalism in Poland.
- 2016 – Kisiel Award in the Publicist category.

== Dubbing ==
- 2005 Robots – as Max Kolanko
- 2008 Journey to the Moon – as Narrator

== Media activity and public reception ==
Max Kolonko has been described as the "Jesus of the Internet", a "star of the Internet", the "first journalist of the fifth estate", and a "window on America."

From 2012 to 2023, Kolonko operated several YouTube channels, including Max Kolonko – MaxTV, which featured his commentary series Mówię jak jest (Telling It Like It Is), and MaxTV News (2013–2023). Between 2017 and 2022, he also published content on his official Facebook page. In total, his presence across YouTube (MaxTV and MaxTVNews), Facebook, and X amassed nearly two million subscribers and followers, with total viewership exceeding 100 million. His programs, which included commentary on social and political issues in both the United States and Poland, were primarily produced in Polish, with optional English subtitles available for some episodes.

Episodes of Telling It Like It Is exceeded 400,000 views within the first month of the channel's launch in late November 2012. During that same period, the channel gained over 4,000 subscribers. As of October 16, 2016, the MaxTV channel – with 134 uploaded videos – ranked 42nd among the most-subscribed Polish-language YouTube channels, with 603,604 subscribers. MaxTVNews, featuring 153 videos, ranked 77th on the same list, with 426,646 subscribers.

One of Kolonko's commentaries – an episode in which he argued that certain British and American news outlets had manipulated reports about an attack on a war veteran in London – became particularly popular, reaching 1.3 million views, while the least-viewed episode attracted about 30,000 viewers (as of June 9, 2013). Some episodes of the Telling It Like It Is series were broadcast on the Polish television channel Superstacja before their release on YouTube. Kolonko currently maintains an official account on X, and episodes of Telling It Like It Is are available through his online television platform, MaxTV, which he founded in 2017.

== Telling It Like It Is (Mówię jak jest) ==
Telling It Like It Is (Polish: Mówię jak jest) is a Polish-language online commentary and news series created and hosted by journalist Max Kolonko. The program was broadcast between 2012 and 2023 on the YouTube channels Max Kolonko – MaxTV and MaxTV News, and was also available on Facebook and now is available on the website MAXTVGO.COM.

Each episode featured the host’s personal commentary on current political, social, and economic issues in Poland and the United States. The program was characterized by a distinctive one-man presentation style and by its recognizable trademark (sign-off): "Mariusz Max Kolonko, Telling It Like It Is."

The series achieved significant popularity, reaching hundreds of thousands of views per episode and over 600,000 channel subscribers at its peak. Some episodes were broadcast on the Polish television channel Superstacja prior to their release online.

As a defender of freedom of speech on the Internet, Max Kolonko became the subject of a cult single titled after his own name, "Max Kolonko", recorded in 2024 by the Polish rap group [Szamz]. The song includes the phrase "Telling It Like It Is, Max Kolonko" (Polish: “Mówię jak jest, Max Kolonko”), regarded as one of Kolonko's most distinctive trademarks.

== MaxTVGO television ==
In 2018 he started his own streaming platform MaxTVGO, which he continues to develop. MaxTVGO is a Polish-American online television platform broadcasting from the United States. Its programming includes news, commentary, political analysis, reportage, and documentaries.

== Political activity ==
In 2015, a civic movement called the "Telling It Like It Is" (Polish: Ruch Mówię Jak Jest) was established around the program. According to Kolonko, its aim was to promote independent media and greater citizen participation in public life. The movement functioned primarily as an online social-media initiative. The grassroots political movement #R Revolution grew out of the "Telling It Like It Is" movement.

During the formal process of gathering support for Kolonko's candidacy for president of Poland, approximately 200,000 people signed a petition calling on him to run in the election. On August 22, 2019, the Committee of Voters Patriotic Revolution of Max Kolonko (Polish: Komitet Wyborczy Wyborców Patriotyczna Rewolucja Maxa Kolonko, KWW Patriotyczna Rewolucja Maxa Kolonko) was formally registered.

In 2020, he ran for president of Poland. His electoral program advocated a presidential system, direct election of judges, electoral reform including e-voting, single-member electoral districts, a reduction in the size of the Sejm to 100 members and the abolition of the Senate, a national referendum on constitutional reform, the creation of a dedicated electoral district for the 20-million-strong Polish diaspora, tax reductions, and restrictions on German capital in the Polish media market. Registration of a presidential candidacy required 100,000 signatures of support. Max Kolonko declined to organize the signature drive due to the COVID-19 pandemic and the associated risk of infection for those collecting and signing the petitions.

== Max Kolonko's Peace Plan for Ukraine ==
In February 2022, two days before the outbreak of the Russo-Ukrainian War, Kolonko published a Peace Plan for Ukraine, proposing the transformation of Ukraine into a federal state called the United States of Ukraine, divided into three sectors (western, central, eastern) with the Free City of Kyiv. The plan aimed to prevent armed conflict, protect civilians and ethnic minorities, mitigate potential humanitarian crises, and support economic development.

Kolonko's plan considered historical and ethnic contexts, aligning sectors with ethnic distributions: the western sector with historic Polish communities, the eastern sector with Russian minorities, and a neutral central buffer zone. It emphasized resolving the conflict through dialogue among Ukrainians, Russians, and Poles, without direct foreign military involvement.

In 2025, the proposal was updated to include the Free City of Kyiv, potentially symbolically joining European structures, and the Polish-American Investment Fund to manage natural resources in the western sector and support local prosperity.

In September 2025, Viktor Orbán, the Prime Minister of Hungary, stated that negotiations on ending the Russo–Ukrainian war would lead to the creation of three distinct zones: an eastern, pro-Russian one; a central, demilitarized (neutral) one; and a western one.
