= Częstochowa Voivodeship =

Former administrative division of Poland

Coordinates: 50°48′46″N 19°06′48″E

Częstochowa Voivodeship Województwo częstochowskie
- Voivodeship of Poland
- 1975–1998
- Location within Poland
- Capital: Częstochowa
- Area
  - 1998: 6,182 km^{2} (2,387 sq mi)
- Population
  - 1998: 779,600
- History
  - Established: 1975
  - Disestablished: 1998
Succeeded by
Silesian Voivodeship
Opole Voivodeship
Świętokrzyskie Voivodeship
Łódź Voivodeship

Częstochowa Voivodeship (Polish: województwo częstochowskie) was a unit of administrative division and local government in Poland from 1975 to 1998, superseded mainly by Silesian Voivodeship, with a few gminas attached to surrounding voivodeships. Though most of the current territory of the former Częstochowa Voivodeship belongs to the Silesian Voivodeship, it historically is part of Lesser Poland, apart from western areas around Lubliniec and Olesno. The voivodeship's capital and largest city was Częstochowa.

Major cities and towns: (population in 1995):

- Częstochowa (259,500);
- Myszków (34,000);
- Lubliniec (26,900).

== See also ==
- Voivodeships of Poland
- Voivodeships of Poland (1975–1998)
