= Andrzej Grzesik =

Polish politician (born 1967)

member of Sejm 2005-2007
- Incumbent
- Assumed office 25 September 2005

Personal details
- Born: 4 January 1967 (age 59) Lubliniec
- Party: Samoobrona

Andrzej Marek Grzesik (born 4 January 1967) is a Polish politician. He was elected to Sejm on 25 September 2005, getting 9501 votes in 28 Częstochowa district as a candidate from Samoobrona Rzeczpospolitej Polskiej list.

He was also a member of Sejm 2001-2005.

== See also ==
- Members of Polish Sejm 2005-2007
