= Woźniki, Lubliniec County =

Woźniki
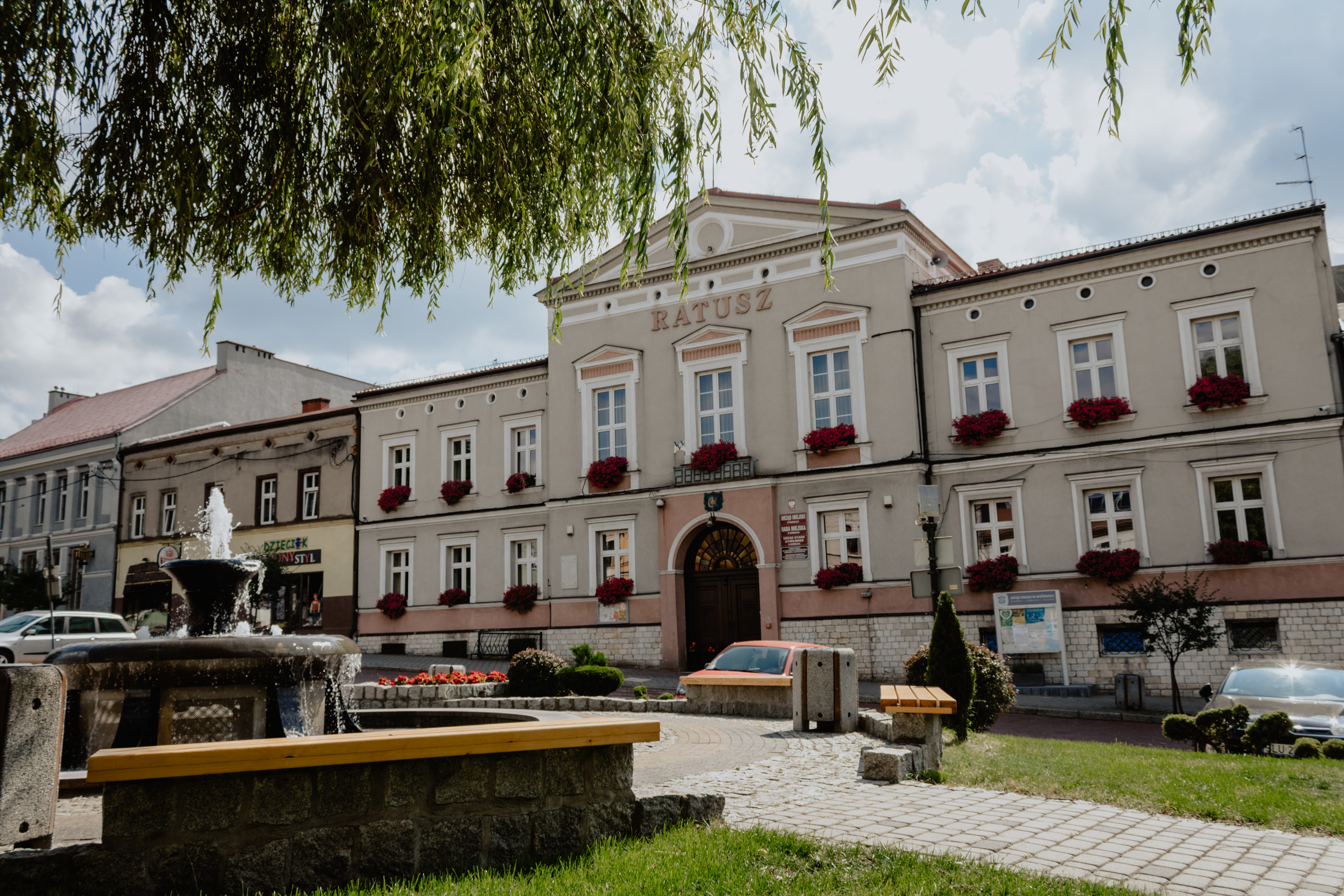
- Woźniki Town Hall

- Coat of arms

- Location within Poland
- Coordinates: 50°35′N 19°3′E
- Country: Poland
- Voivodeship: Silesian
- County: Lubliniec
- Gmina: Woźniki
- First mentioned: 1206
- Town rights: 1386

Government
  - Mayor: Michał Józef Aloszko

Area
  - Total: 70.92 km^{2} (27.38 sq mi)

Population (2019-06-30)
  - Total: 4,305
  - Density: 60.70/km^{2} (157.2/sq mi)
- Time zone: UTC+1 (CET)
  - Summer (DST): UTC+2 (CEST)
- Postal code: 42-289
- Car plates: SLU
- Website: http://www.wozniki.pl

Woźniki [vɔʑˈniki] is a town in Lubliniec County, Silesian Voivodeship, in southern Poland, with 4,305 inhabitants (2019).

It is situated in the historic Upper Silesia region, close to the border with Lesser Poland.

== History ==
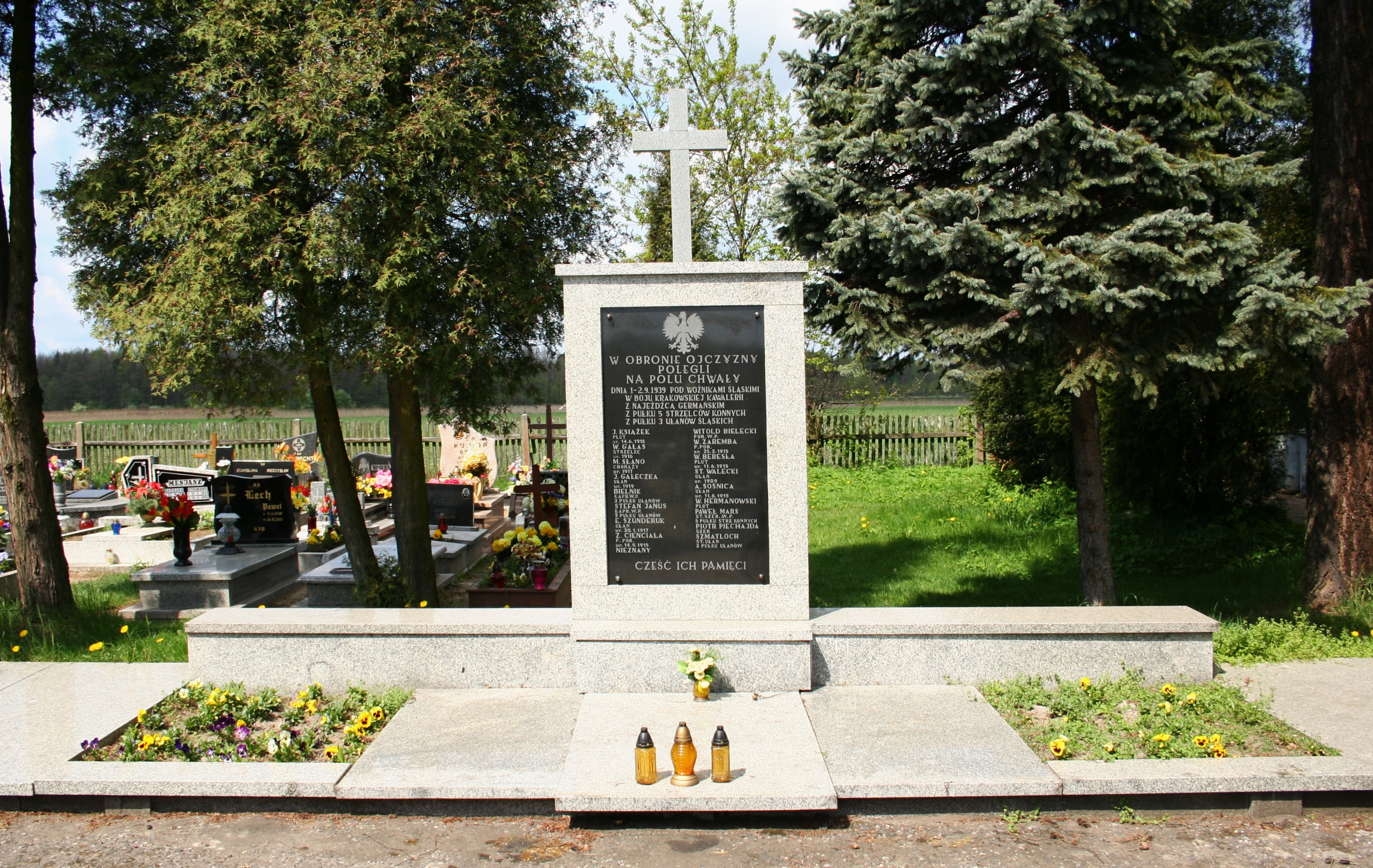
Monument to Polish soldiers killed in the Battle of Woźniki during the German invasion of Poland at the start of World War II

According to legend, a Silesian fortress on the nearby Grojec mountain was devastated during the Mongol invasion of Poland in 1241, whereafter the inhabitants moved to the present location. Nevertheless, the settlement was first mentioned in a 1206 deed issued by Bishop Fulko of Kraków. It received market rights from the Upper Silesian Dukes of Opole, town privileges were confirmed by Duke Bernard of Niemodlin in 1454.

With most of Silesia it was annexed by Prussia in 1742, and after the Napoleonic Wars became an important border town close to Russian-controlled Congress Poland – Emperor Alexander I passed it on his way to the 1815 Congress of Vienna. In Woźniki lived the Polish writer and activist Józef Lompa (1797–1863). The local Catholic parish remained part of the Diocese of Kraków until 1822, when it passed to the Diocese of Wrocław. Four annual fairs were held in the town in the late 19th century. The Woischnik estates were a possession of the Henckel von Donnersmarck noble family until the town passed to the Silesian Voivodeship of the Second Polish Republic upon the Upper Silesia plebiscite in 1921.

Following the joint German-Soviet invasion of Poland, which started World War II in September 1939, the town was occupied by Germany until 1945.

== Twin towns – sister cities ==
See twin towns of Gmina Woźniki.
