= Kamienica, Silesian Voivodeship =

Kamienica
- Village
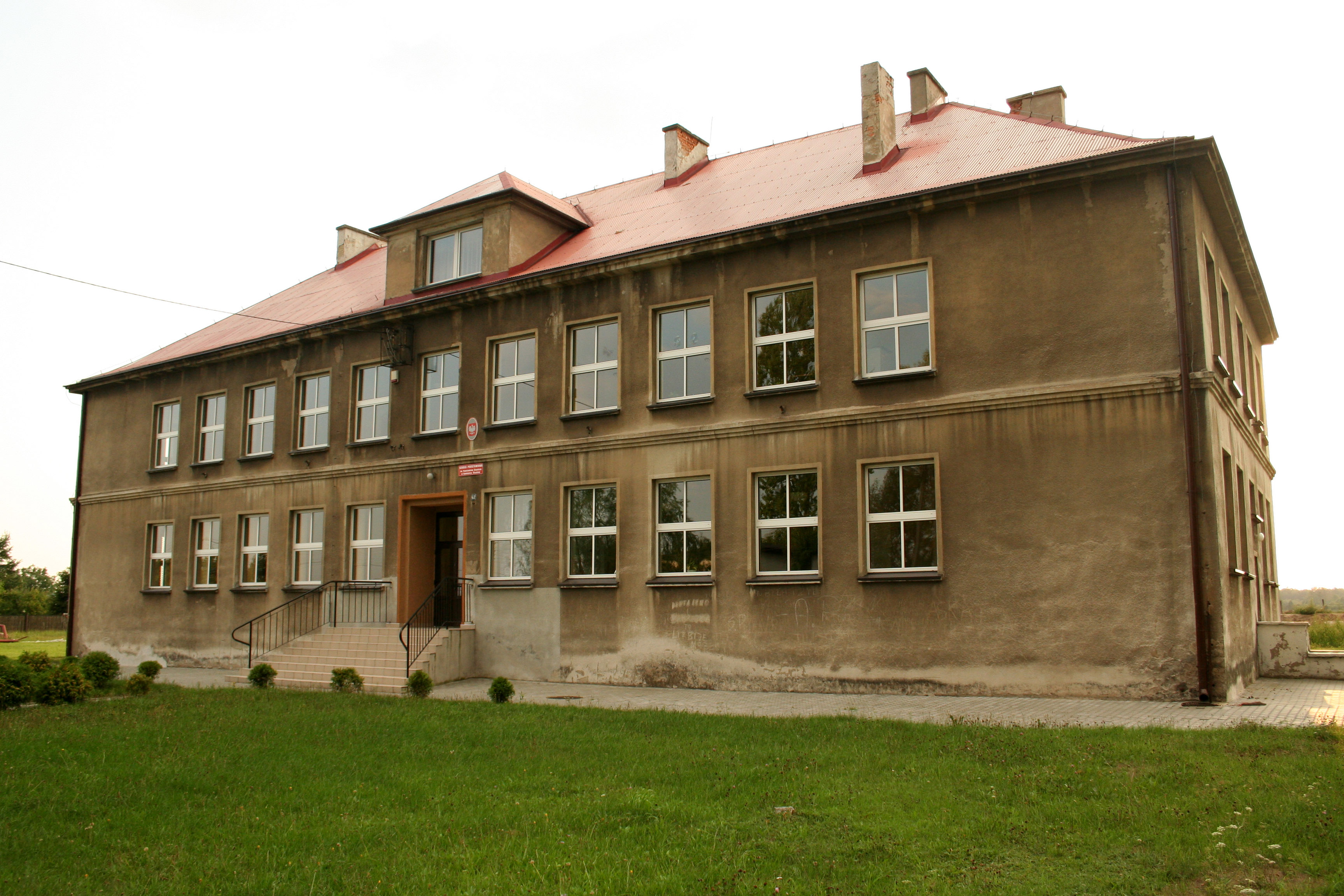
- School in Kamienica

- Location within Poland
- Coordinates: 50°38′8″N 18°59′34″E
- Country: Poland
- Voivodeship: Silesian
- County: Lubliniec
- Gmina: Woźniki
- Time zone: UTC+1 (CET)
  - Summer (DST): UTC+2 (CEST)
- Vehicle registration: SLU

Kamienica [kamjɛˈnit͡sa] is a village in the administrative district of Gmina Woźniki, within Lubliniec County, Silesian Voivodeship, in southern Poland.

The name of the village is of Polish origin and is derived from the word kamień, which means "stone".
