= Okrąglik, Lubliniec County =

Okrąglik
- Village
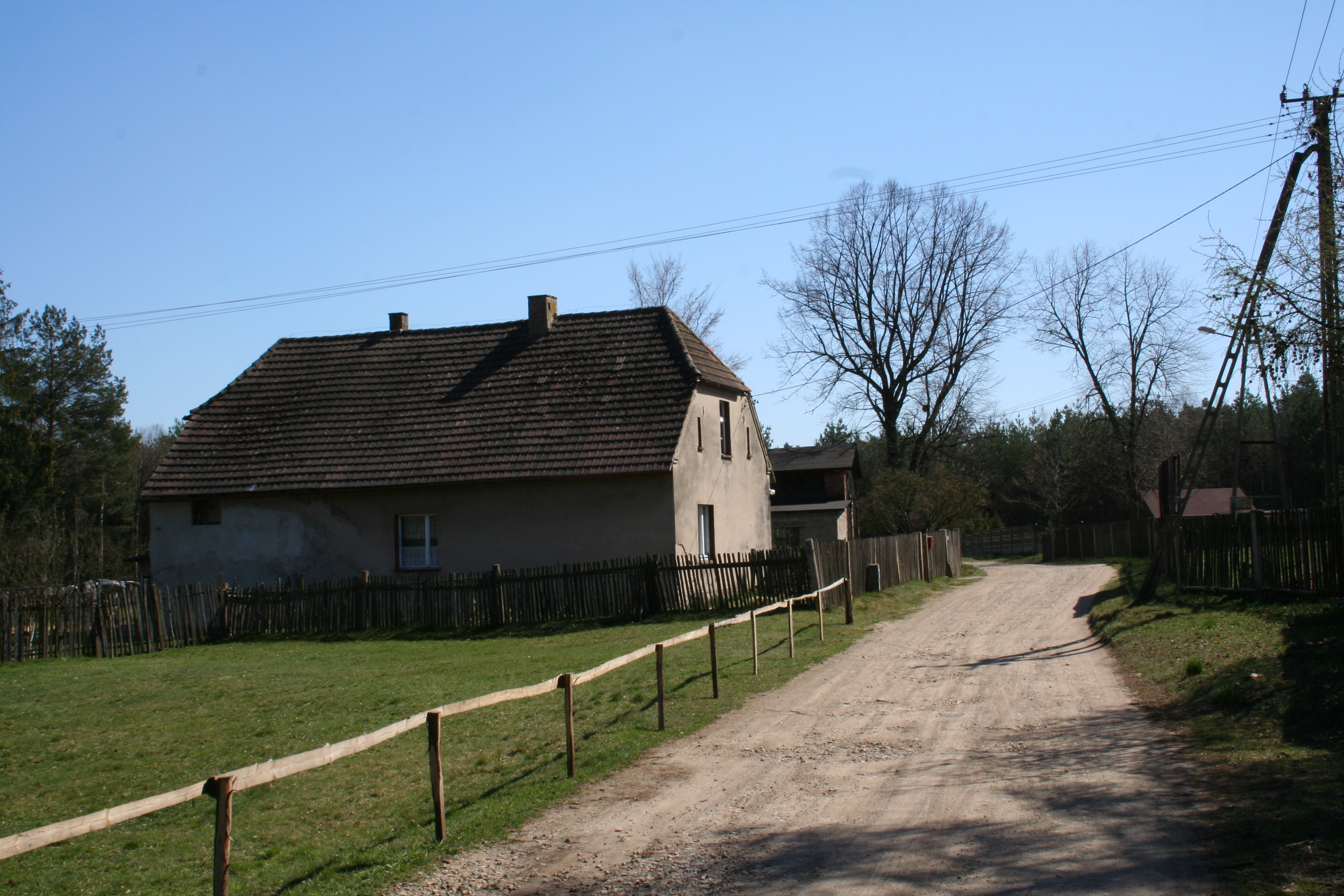

- Location within Poland
- Coordinates: 50°39′31″N 18°59′12″E
- Country: Poland
- Voivodeship: Silesian
- County: Lubliniec
- Gmina: Woźniki
- Population: 15

Okrąglik [ɔˈkrɔnɡlik] is a village in the administrative district of Gmina Woźniki, within Lubliniec County, Silesian Voivodeship, in southern Poland.
