= Sośnica, Silesian Voivodeship =

Sośnica
- Village
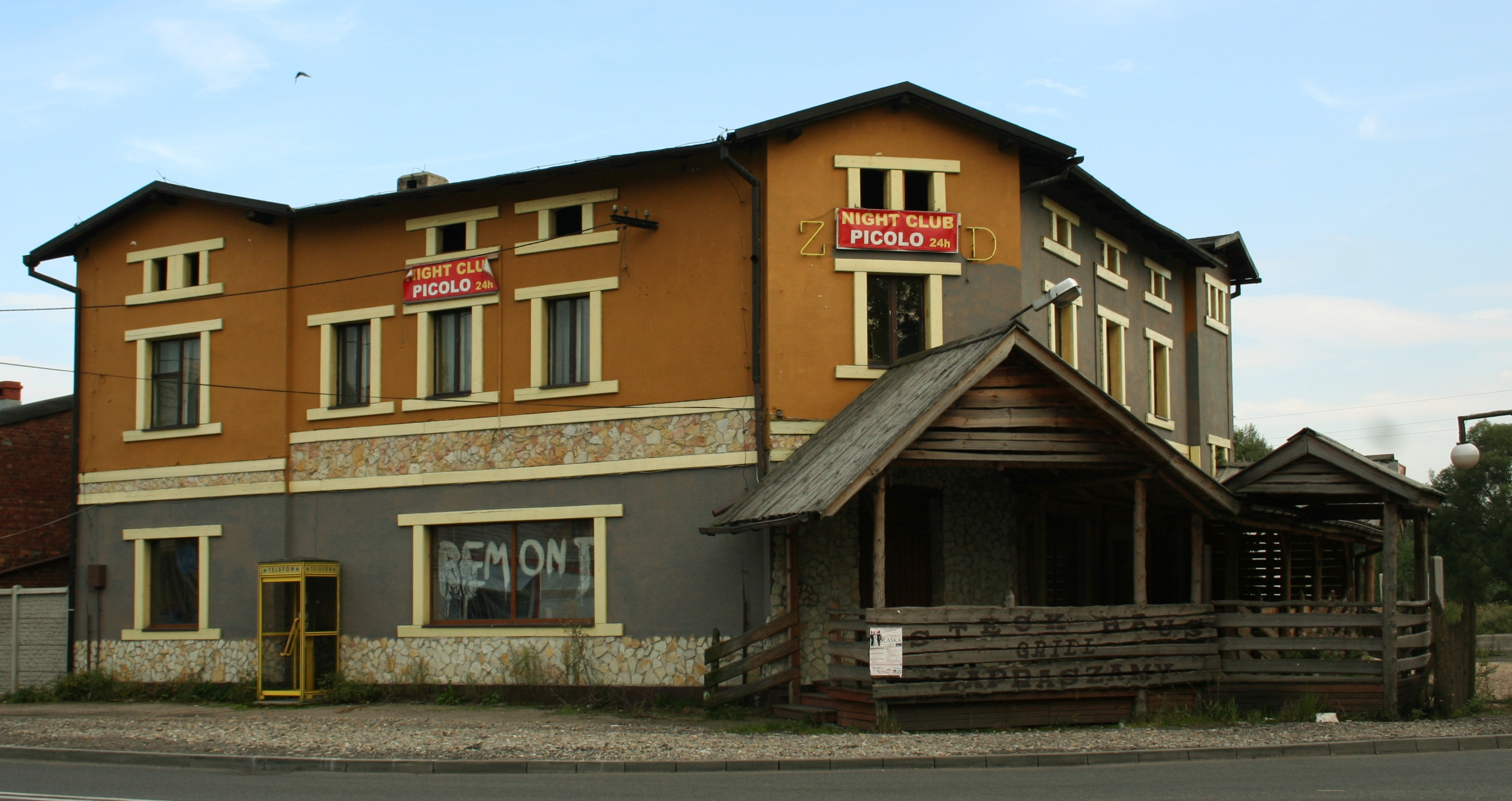

- Location within Poland
- Coordinates: 50°34′35″N 18°58′14″E
- Country: Poland
- Voivodeship: Silesian
- County: Lubliniec
- Gmina: Woźniki

Sośnica [sɔɕˈnit͡sa] is a village in the administrative district of Gmina Woźniki, within Lubliniec County, Silesian Voivodeship, in southern Poland.
