= Czarny Las, Lubliniec County =

Czarny Las
- Village
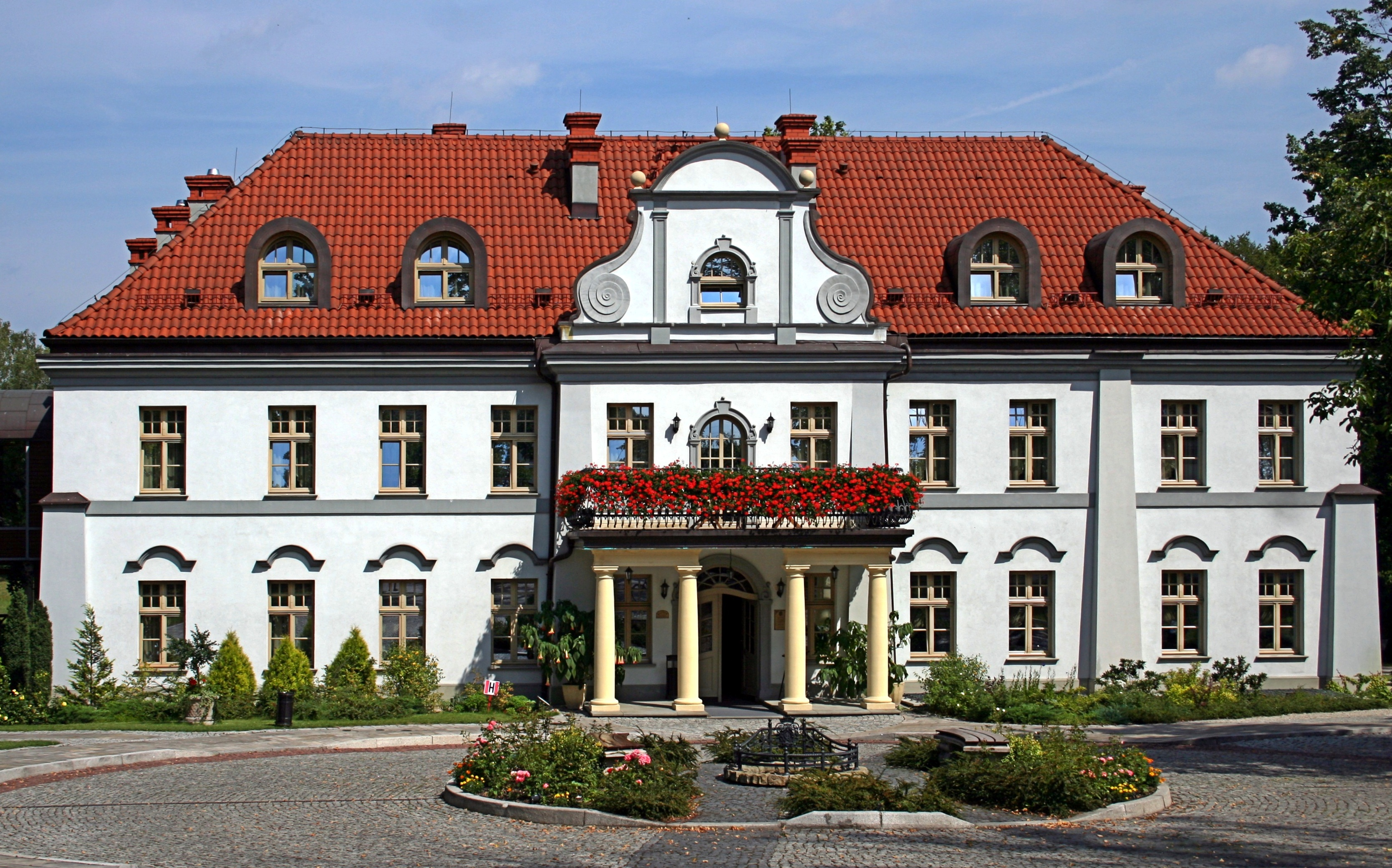
- Palace in Czarny Las

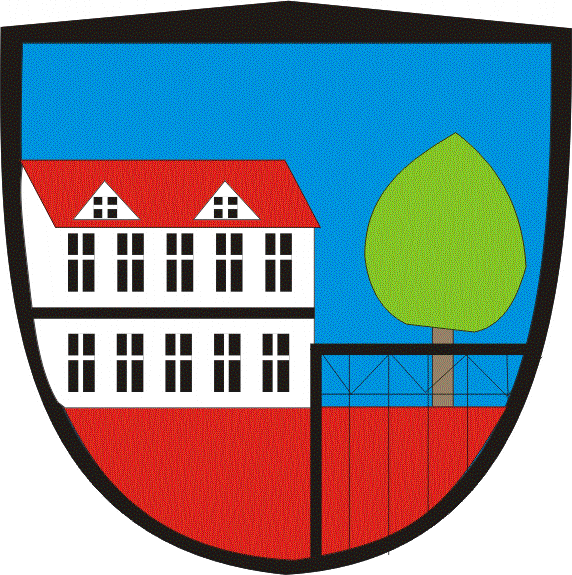
- Coat of arms

- Location within Poland
- Coordinates: 50°37′36″N 19°04′03″E
- Country: Poland
- Voivodeship: Silesian
- County: Lubliniec
- Gmina: Woźniki

Czarny Las [ˈt͡ʂarnɨ ˈlas] is a village in the administrative district of Gmina Woźniki, within Lubliniec County, Silesian Voivodeship, in southern Poland.
