= Lubsza, Silesian Voivodeship =

Lubsza
- Village
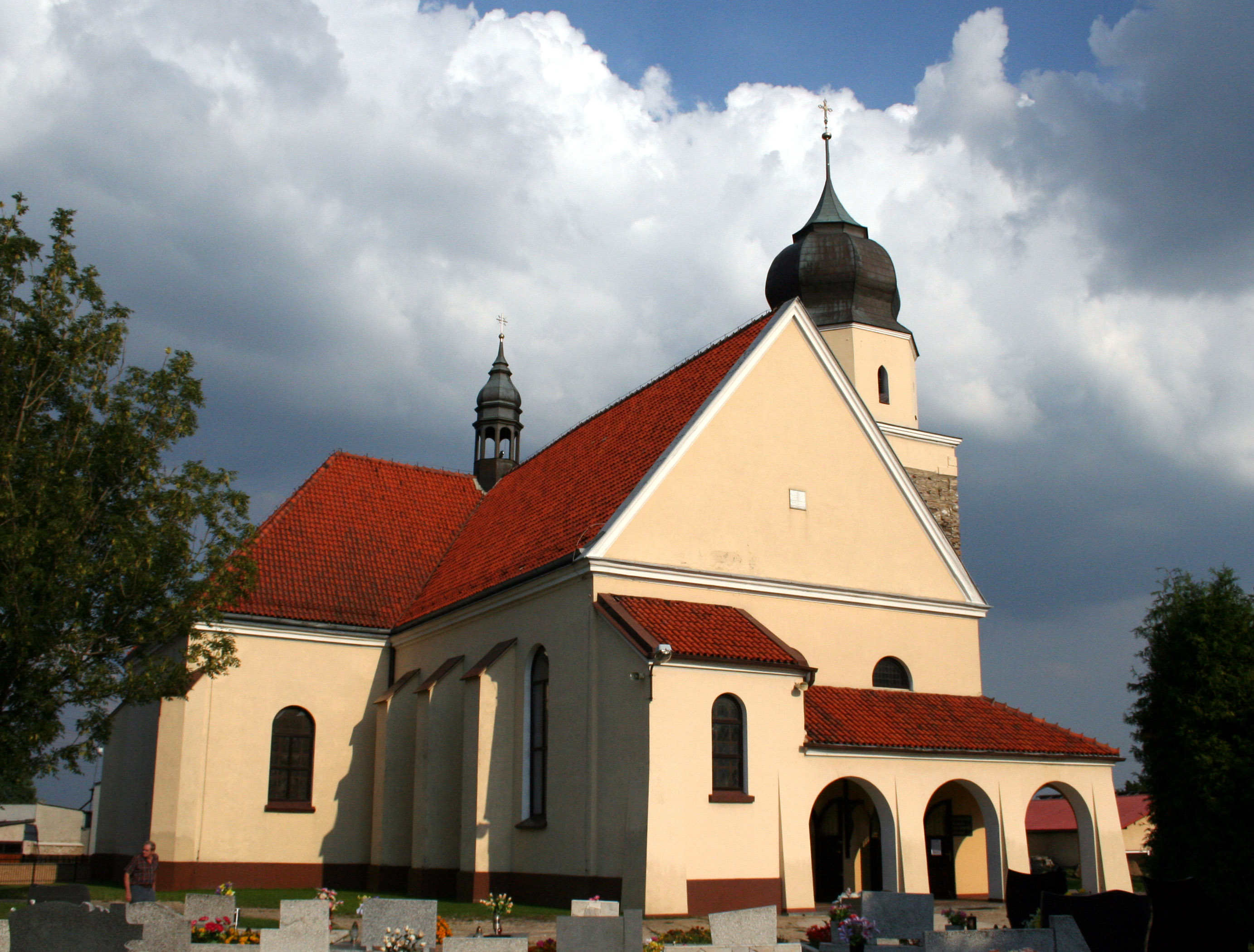
- Church of Saint James the Elder

- Location within Poland
- Coordinates: 50°36′33″N 19°0′0″E
- Country: Poland
- Voivodeship: Silesian
- County: Lubliniec
- Gmina: Woźniki
- Elevation: 350 m (1,150 ft)

Population (approx.)
  - Total: 1,000
- Website: http://www.wozniki.pl/wozniki/?k;37

Lubsza [ˈlupʂa] is a village in the administrative district of Gmina Woźniki, within Lubliniec County, Silesian Voivodeship, in southern Poland.
