= Jamki, Silesian Voivodeship =

Jamki
- Village
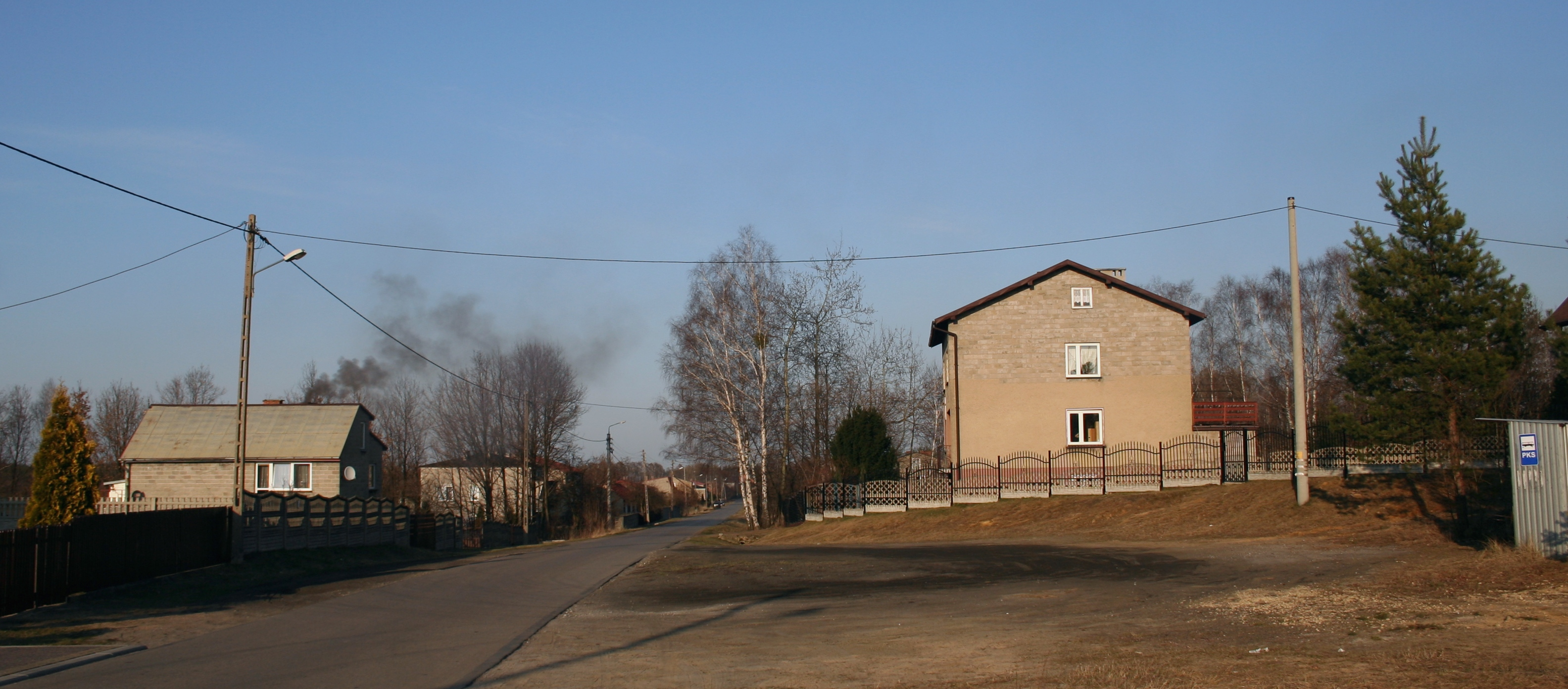

- Location within Poland
- Coordinates: 50°42′N 18°59′E
- Country: Poland
- Voivodeship: Silesian
- County: Częstochowa
- Gmina: Konopiska
- Population: 522

Jamki [ˈjamki] is a village in the administrative district of Gmina Konopiska, within Częstochowa County, Silesian Voivodeship, in southern Poland.
