= Konradów, Silesian Voivodeship =

Konradów
- Village
- Location within Poland
- Coordinates: 50°48′N 18°58′E
- Country: Poland
- Voivodeship: Silesian
- County: Częstochowa
- Gmina: Blachownia
- Population: 429

Konradów [kɔnˈraduf] is a village in the administrative district of Gmina Blachownia, within Częstochowa County, Silesian Voivodeship, in southern Poland.
