= Walaszczyki =

- Village
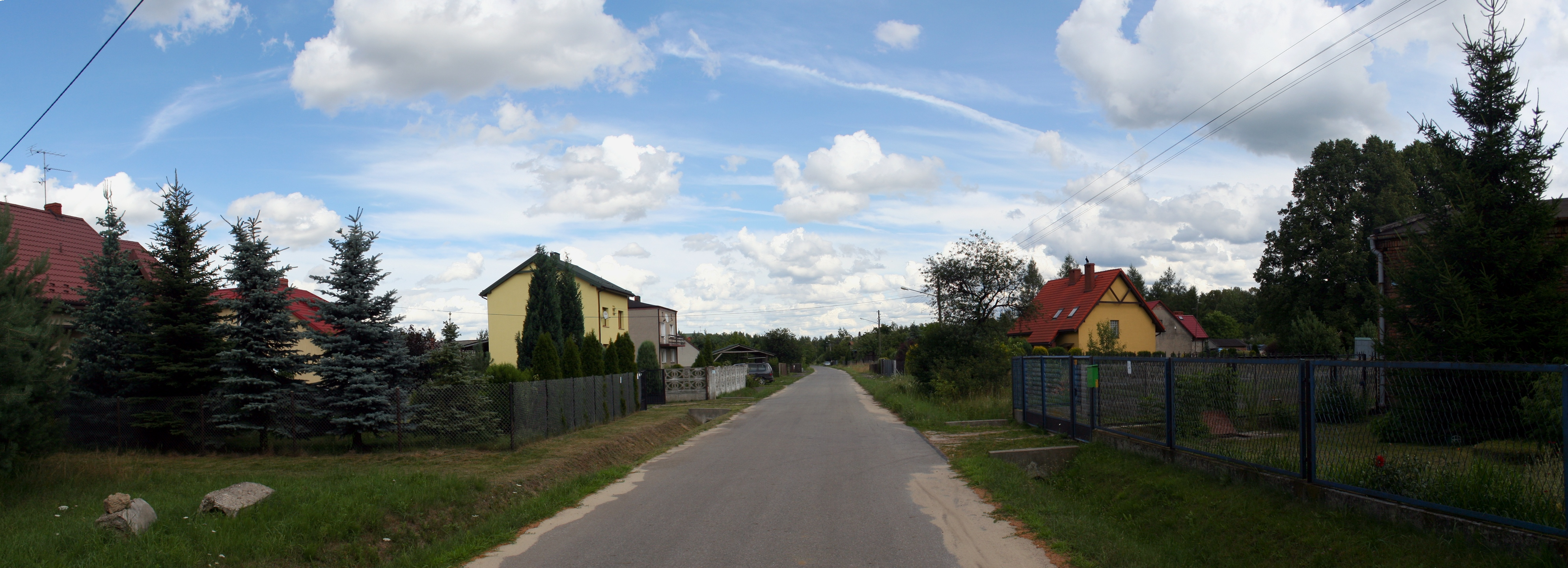

- Location within Poland
- Coordinates: 50°46′N 19°0′E
- Country: Poland
- Voivodeship: Silesian
- County: Częstochowa
- Gmina: Konopiska
- Population: 103

Walaszczyki [valaʂˈt͡ʂɨki] is a village in the administrative district of Gmina Konopiska, within Częstochowa County, Silesian Voivodeship, in southern Poland.
