= Cielec =

- Settlement
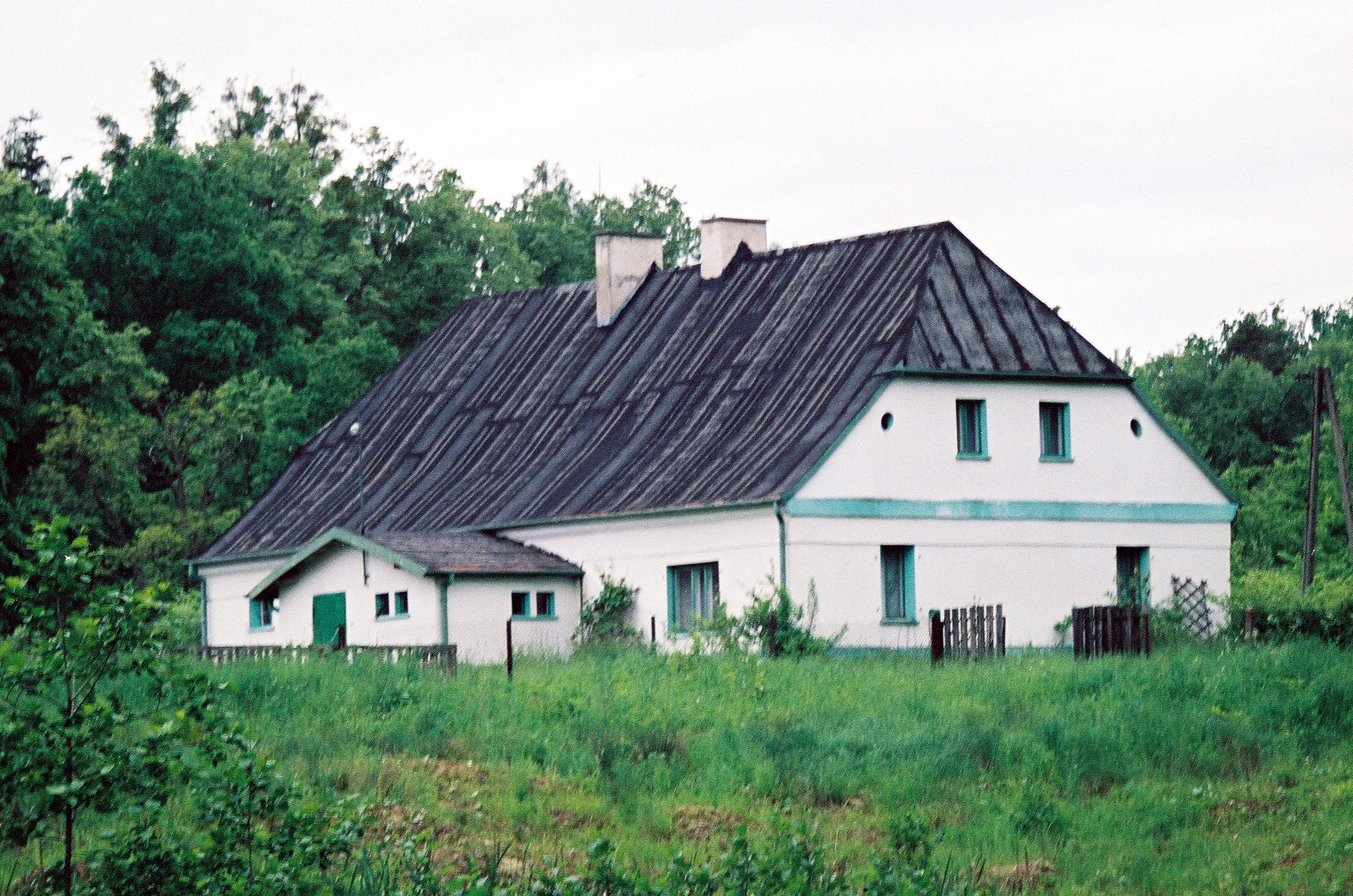
- Former building of the forestry

- Location within Poland
- Coordinates: 50°39′N 18°53′E
- Country: Poland
- Voivodeship: Silesian
- County: Lubliniec
- Gmina: Boronów
- Population: 0

Cielec [ˈt͡ɕɛlɛt͡s] is a former settlement in the administrative district of Gmina Boronów, within Lubliniec County, Silesian Voivodeship, in southern Poland.
