= Łojki, Silesian Voivodeship =

Łojki
- Village
- Location within Poland
- Coordinates: 50°47′N 19°0′E
- Country: Poland
- Voivodeship: Silesian
- County: Częstochowa
- Gmina: Blachownia
- Population: 1,311

Łojki [ˈwɔi̯ki] is a village in the administrative district of Gmina Blachownia, within Częstochowa County, Silesian Voivodeship, in southern Poland.
