= Konopiska =

- Village
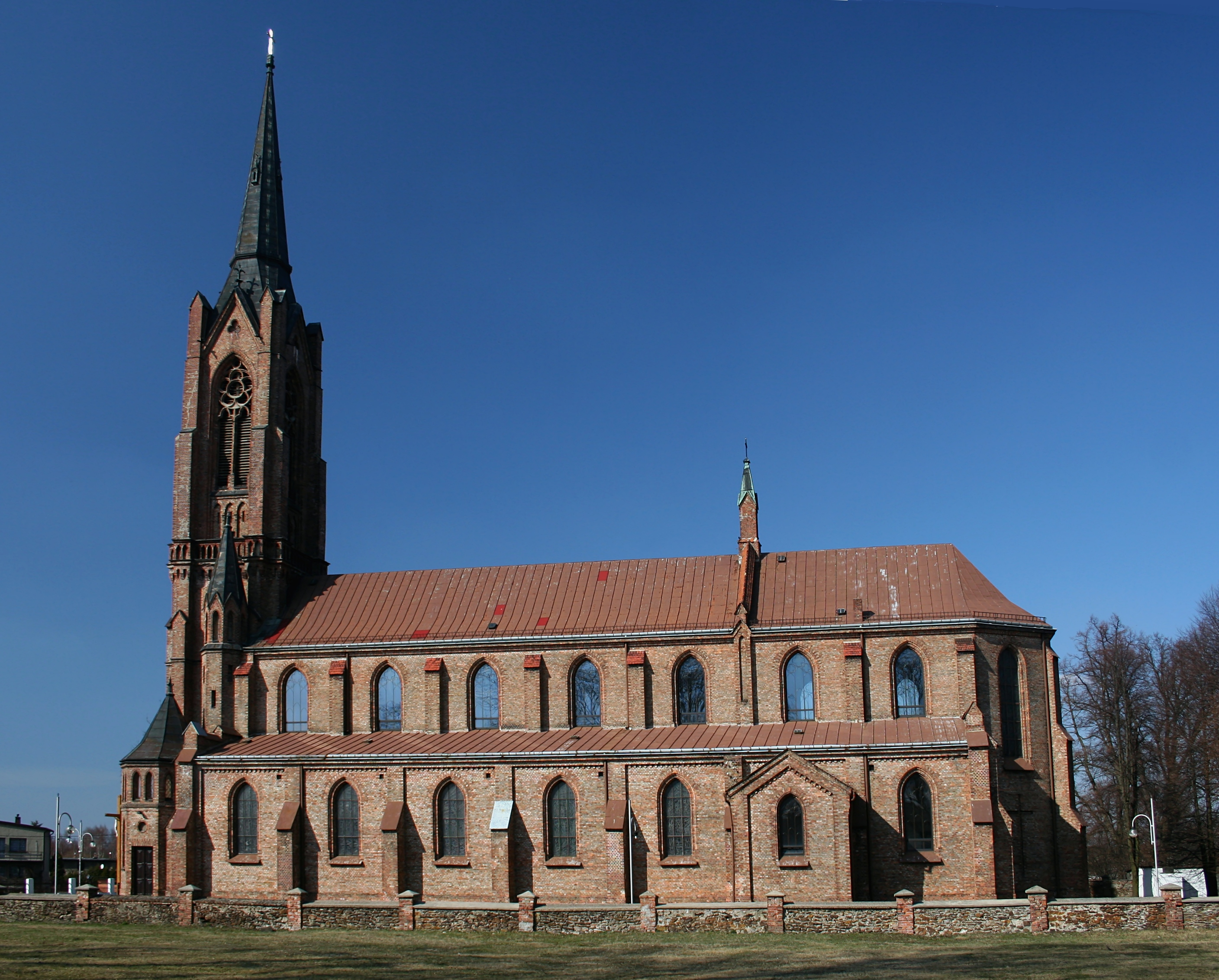
- Church of Saints Valentine and Lawrence

- Flag

- Location within Poland
- Coordinates: 50°43′32″N 19°0′30″E
- Country: Poland
- Voivodeship: Silesian
- County: Częstochowa
- Gmina: Konopiska

Population
  - Total: 2,901

Konopiska [kɔnɔˈpiska] is a village in Częstochowa County, Silesian Voivodeship, in southern Poland. It is the seat of the gmina (administrative district) called Gmina Konopiska.
