= Rększowice =

- Village
- Location within Poland
- Coordinates: 50°42′N 19°1′E
- Country: Poland
- Voivodeship: Silesian
- County: Częstochowa
- Gmina: Konopiska
- Population: 931
- Website: http://konopiska.home.pl/solectwa/rekszowice.pdf

Rększowice [rɛnkʂɔˈvit͡sɛ] is a village in the administrative district of Gmina Konopiska, within Częstochowa County, Silesian Voivodeship, in southern Poland.
