= Gmina Blachownia =

Gmina Blachownia Blachownia Commune
- Gmina
- Flag Coat of arms
- Interactive map of Gmina Blachownia
- Coordinates (Blachownia): 50°47′N 18°58′E
- Country: Poland
- Voivodeship: Silesian
- County: Częstochowa
- Seat: Blachownia

Area
  - Total: 67.21 km^{2} (25.95 sq mi)

Population (2019-06-30)
  - Total: 12,935
  - Density: 192.5/km^{2} (498.5/sq mi)
  - Urban: 9,545
  - Rural: 3,390
- Website: http://gminablachownia.pl/

Gmina Blachownia is an urban-rural gmina (administrative district) in Częstochowa County, Silesian Voivodeship, in southern Poland. Its seat is the town of Blachownia, which lies approximately 11 kilometres (7 mi) west of Częstochowa and 60 km (37 mi) north of the regional capital Katowice.

The gmina covers an area of 67.21 square kilometres (25.9 sq mi), and as of 2019, its total population was 12,935.

The gmina contains part of the protected area called Upper Liswarta Forests Landscape Park.

== Villages ==
Apart from the town of Blachownia, Gmina Blachownia contains the villages and settlements of Kolonia Łojki, Konradów, Łojki and Wyrazów.

== Neighbouring gminas ==
Gmina Blachownia is bordered by the city of Częstochowa and by the gminas of Herby, Konopiska and Wręczyca Wielka.
