= Blachownia =

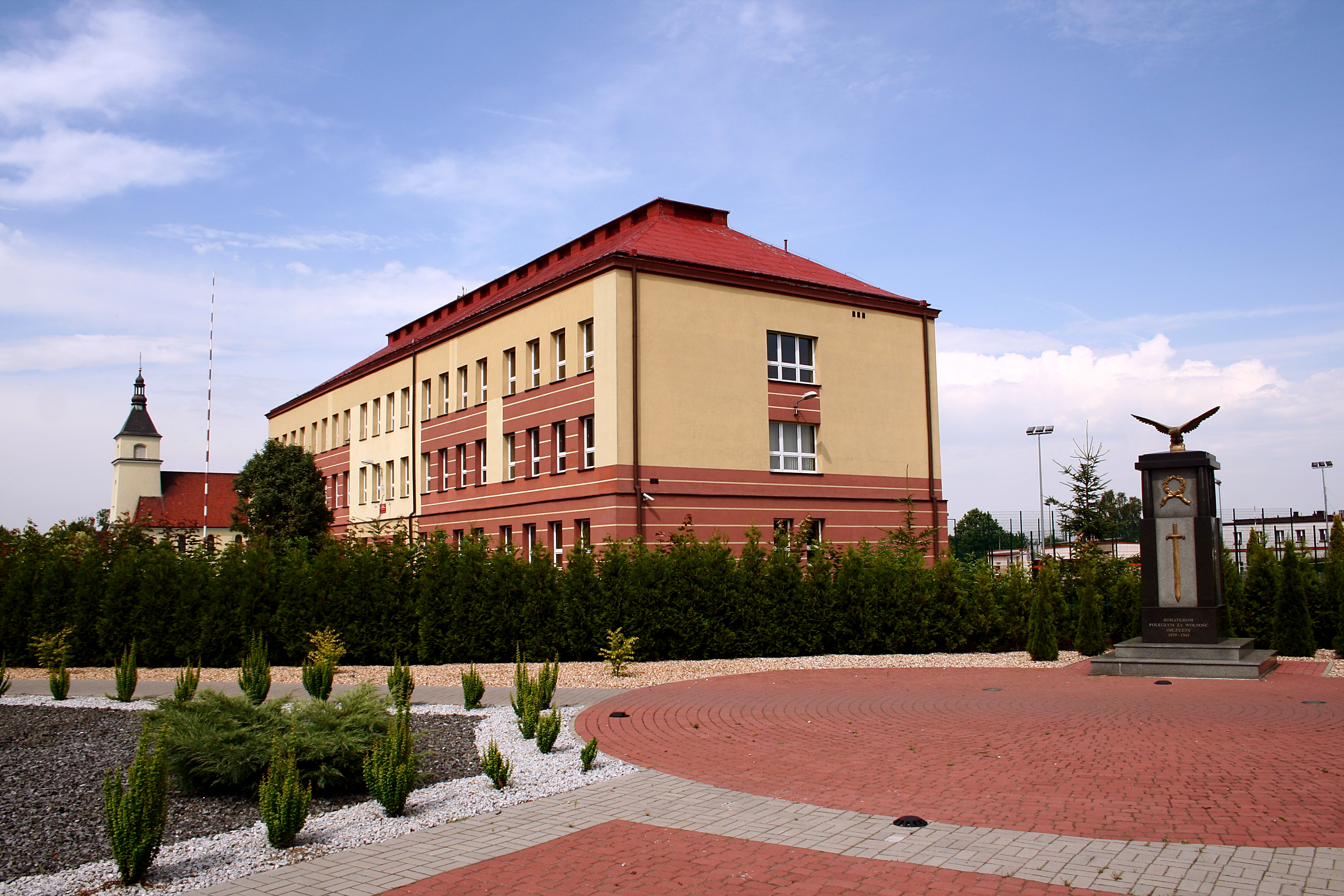
- Primary School No. 1 and World War II memorial

- Flag Coat of arms

- Location within Poland
- Coordinates: 50°47′N 18°58′E
- Country: Poland
- Voivodeship: Silesian
- County: Częstochowa
- Gmina: Blachownia
- Established: 17th century
- Town rights: 1967

Government
  - Mayor: Cezary Osiński

Area
  - Total: 36.66 km^{2} (14.15 sq mi)

Population (31 December 2021)
  - Total: 9,383
  - Density: 256/km^{2} (660/sq mi)
- Time zone: UTC+1 (CET)
  - Summer (DST): UTC+2 (CEST)
- Postal code: 42-290
- Area code: +48 34
- Climate: Cfb
- Car plates: SCZ
- Website: http://blachownia.pl/

Blachownia [blaˈxɔvɲa] is a town in Częstochowa County, Silesian Voivodeship, in southern Poland. The town belongs to historic Lesser Poland. As of December 2021, it has a population of 9,383.

== History ==
The history of Blachownia dates back to 1356, when King Casimir III the Great gave permission to establish two villages in the area under the jurisdiction of a starosta from nearby Olsztyn. This resulted in an influx of settlers, and this area of western lesser Poland, located near the border with Czech-ruled Silesia, emerged as a center of industry, with several forges and bloomeries. In the 16th century, when the settlement of Łojki (future Blachownia) belonged to Kraków Voivodeship, it had as many as 36 forges, powered by water wheels. Furthermore, iron ore was excavated here, and in one of the still-existing documents from 1531, King Sigismund II Augustus allowed a man named Błażej Łojek to run a forge. In 1606, within the boundaries of today's Blachownia, was a settlement called Trzepizury, which consisted of three houses and an inn.

In 1610, Mikołaj Wolski, the starosta of Krzepice built two early blast furnaces, also purchasing a forge with two hammers, powered by water. By 1630, local metal plants manufactured app. 800 wagons of iron annually, together with farming tools, sheet metal, and cannonballs. In 1631, the metal plants were visited by King Władysław IV Vasa. In the second half of the 17th century, the Blachownia industrial center declined, together with whole Lesser Poland, following the Swedish invasion of Poland. For 150 years local plants were not mentioned in any sources. In 1782, two bloomeries near Krzepice are described.

After the Partitions of Poland, Blachownia since 1815 belonged to Russian-controlled Congress Poland, from 1867 on as part of Piotrków Governorate. Due to efforts of Stanisław Staszic, artisans from Gliwice and technology from Berlin were brought to Blachownia, to recreate metal industry. In 1834, Bank Polski leased area for the future steel mill, with two modern blast furnaces. Soon afterwards, the first iron ore mines were opened, and in 1837, the furnaces were in use. The mill was managed by a German engineer Heinrich Karl Kaden from Saxony, and the cost of the construction of the factory was 382,099 zlotys. To increase energy input, a steam machine was brought from England, making Blachownia one of the most modern mills in Congress Poland. In 1838, Huta Blachownia employed 74 people, soon afterwards, a foundry was added. By 1848, however, the cost of manufacturing turned out to be too high, and there was no demand for Blachownia's products. In 1872, the mill was taken over by the Russian Imperial family, which in 1897 leased it to a Berlin company Laura und Konigshutte. The mill employed app. 500 people, and its products were exported mostly to the vast Russian Empire, including its Far East. Workers from Blachownia actively participated in the Revolution of 1905.

Blachownia was one of the first settlements, which was captured by the German Imperial troops at the beginning of World War I. German occupation lasted from August 1914 to November 1918, and during that time, there was a sharp decline in the living standards, and employment was reduced from 1200 (as for 1913) to 400. In the Second Polish Republic, Blachownia belonged to Kielce Voivodeship. The steel mill was nationalized and later sold to B. Handtke Association from Warsaw. The settlement had its own sports association, fire brigade and schools.

As Blachownia was captured on the third day of the German invasion of Poland (Sept. 3, 1939, at 5 a.m.), which started World War II. Blachownia was directly annexed into the Third Reich, as part of Gau Upper Silesia (see Polish areas annexed by Nazi Germany). The Germans changed its name into Blachstadt, and created a county (Kreis Blachstadt). Blachownia was the seat of the local Gestapo and Arbeitsamt office. The mill was renamed into Eisenwerke Handler, and Polish forced workers (OST-Arbeiter) were treated like slaves, working for 11 hours a day, with minimum salaries. The local police chief and one other Polish policeman from Blachownia were murdered by the Russians in the Katyn massacre in 1940.

After the war, Blachownia belonged to Kielce Voivodeship until 1950, and in that year it was moved to Katowice Voivodeship.

== Transport ==
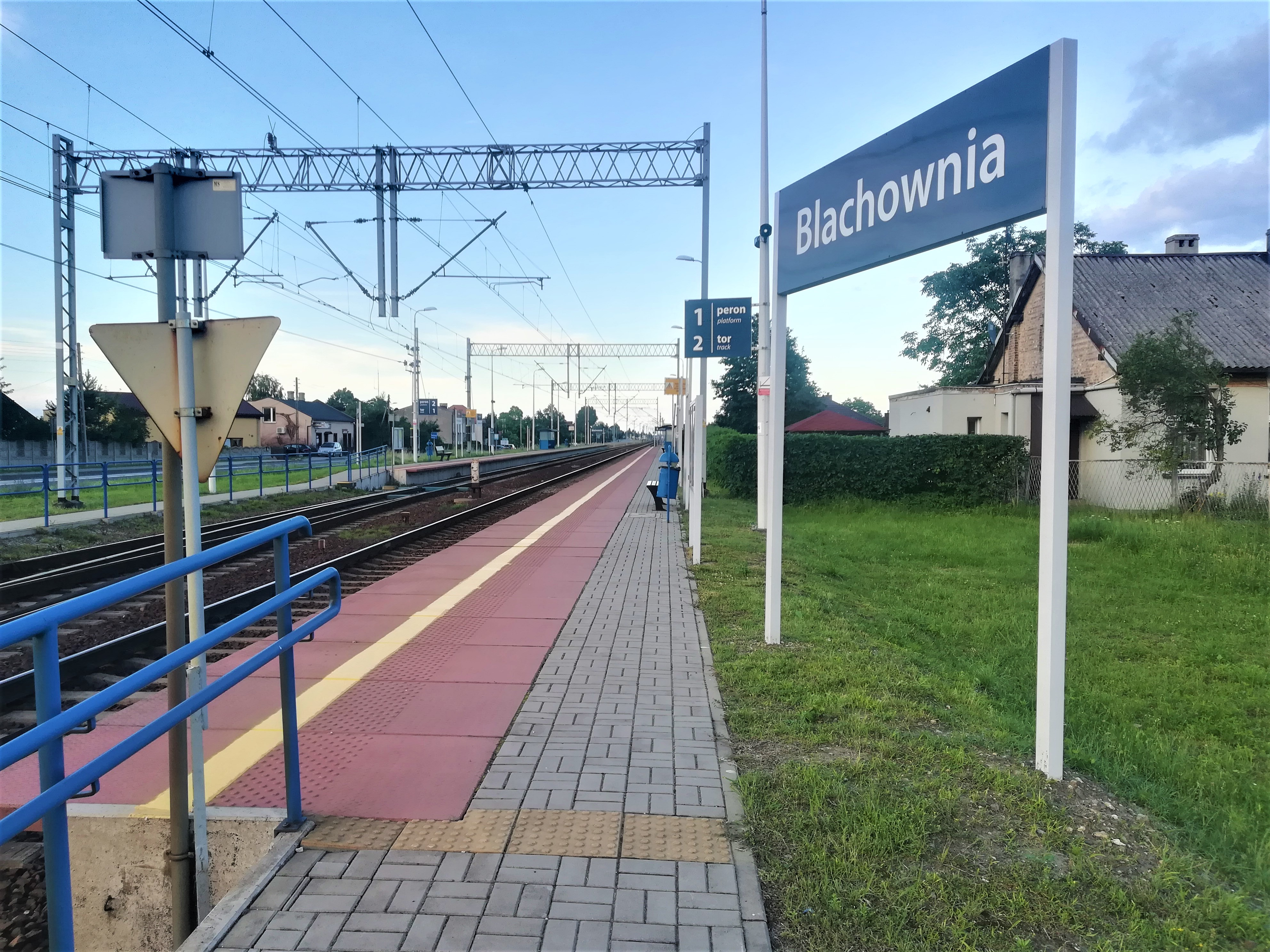
Railway station

The town is located along the national road 46; voivodeship roads nr. 492 and 904 also pass through the town. The A1 motorway passes to the east of Blachownia. The town also has a railroad station. Since Blachownia lies close to Częstochowa, it is served by the city mass transit system.
