= Aleksandria, Silesian Voivodeship =

Aleksandria
- Village
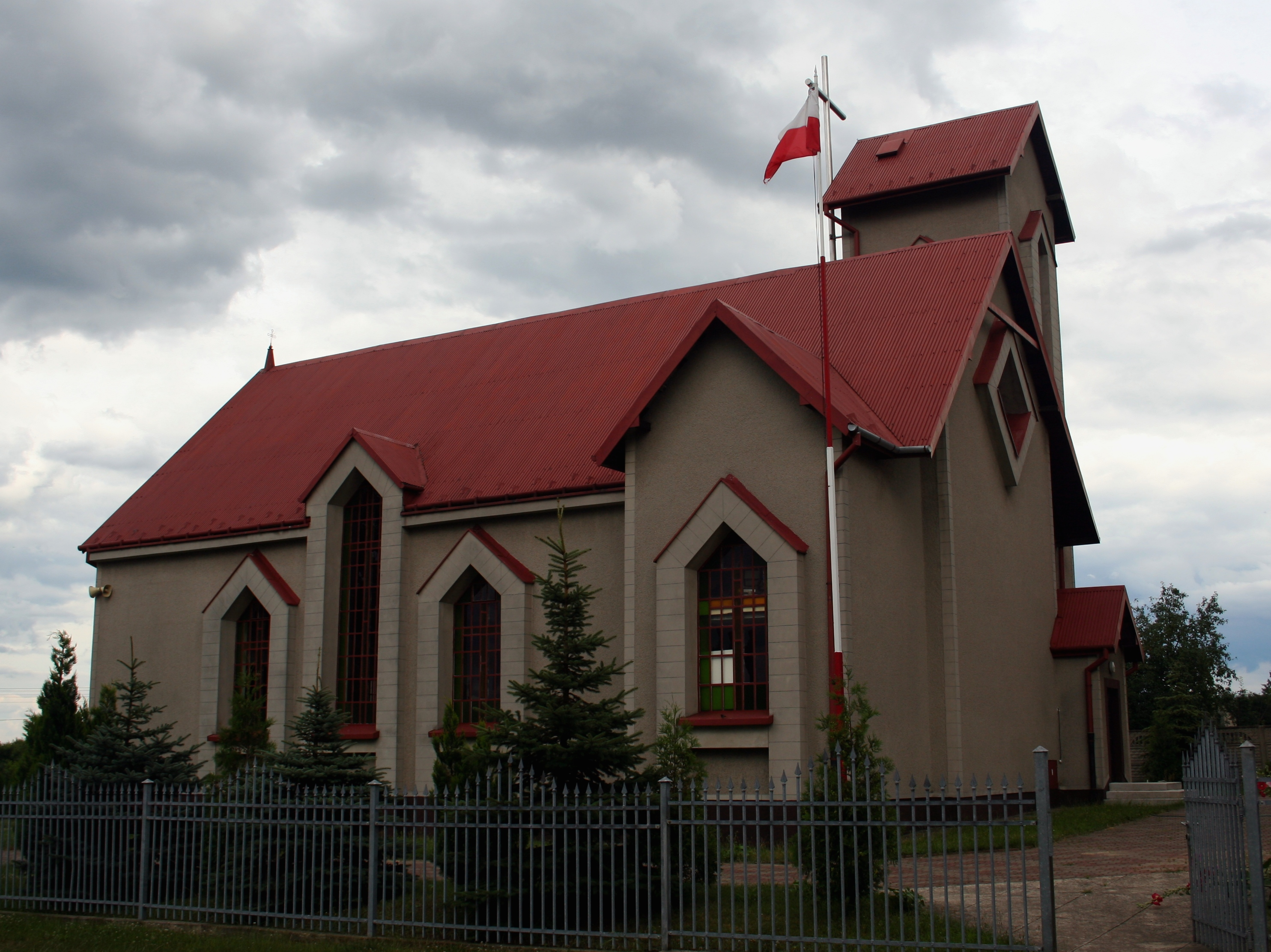
- Church of Saint Maximilian Kolbe

- Location within Poland
- Coordinates: 50°44′N 18°57′E
- Country: Poland
- Voivodeship: Silesian
- County: Częstochowa
- Gmina: Konopiska
- Elevation: 275 m (902 ft)

Population
  - Total: 2,131
- Time zone: UTC+1 (CET)
  - Summer (DST): UTC+2 (CEST)
- Postal code: 42-274
- ISO 3166 code: POL
- Vehicle registration: SCZ
- Website: http://konopiska.home.pl/solectwa/aleksandria.pdf

Aleksandria [alɛkˈsandrja] is a village in the administrative district of Gmina Konopiska, within Częstochowa County, Silesian Voivodeship, in southern Poland.

== History ==
The village was founded in honor of Russian Emperor Alexander II. Previously, this area was covered with forest. In Alexandria there is a Church of Maximilian Kolbe built in 1991. There is also the house of the Missionaries of St. Anthony Mary Claret.
