= Wygoda, Silesian Voivodeship =

Wygoda
- Village
- Location within Poland
- Coordinates: 50°44′N 19°1′E
- Country: Poland
- Voivodeship: Silesian
- County: Częstochowa
- Gmina: Konopiska
- Population: 387

Wygoda [vɨˈɡɔda] is a village in the administrative district of Gmina Konopiska, within Częstochowa County, Silesian Voivodeship, in southern Poland.
