= Gmina Konopiska =

Gmina Konopiska Konopiska Commune
- Gmina
- Coat of arms
- Interactive map of Gmina Konopiska
- Coordinates (Konopiska): 50°43′32″N 19°0′30″E
- Country: Poland
- Voivodeship: Silesian
- County: Częstochowa
- Seat: Konopiska

Area
  - Total: 78.11 km^{2} (30.16 sq mi)

Population (2019-06-30)
  - Total: 10,715
  - Density: 137.2/km^{2} (355.3/sq mi)
- Website: http://www.konopiska.pl

Gmina Konopiska is a rural gmina (administrative district) in Częstochowa County, Silesian Voivodeship, in southern Poland. Its seat is the village of Konopiska, which lies approximately 12 kilometres (7 mi) south-west of Częstochowa and 53 km (33 mi) north of the regional capital Katowice.

The gmina covers an area of 78.11 square kilometres (30.2 sq mi), and as of 2019, its total population was 10,715.

The gmina contains part of the protected area called Upper Liswarta Forests Landscape Park.

== Villages ==
Gmina Konopiska contains the villages and settlements of Aleksandria, Aleksandria Druga, Hutki, Jamki, Konopiska, Kopalnia, Korzonek, Kowale, Łaziec, Leśniaki, Rększowice, Walaszczyki, Wąsosz and Wygoda.

== Neighbouring gminas ==
Gmina Konopiska is bordered by the city of Częstochowa and by the gminas of Blachownia, Boronów, Herby, Poczesna, Starcza and Woźniki.

== Twin towns – sister cities ==
Gmina Konopiska is twinned with:

- Dzhuriv, Ukraine
- Handlová, Slovakia
- Hanstein-Rusteberg, Germany
