= Boronów =

- Village
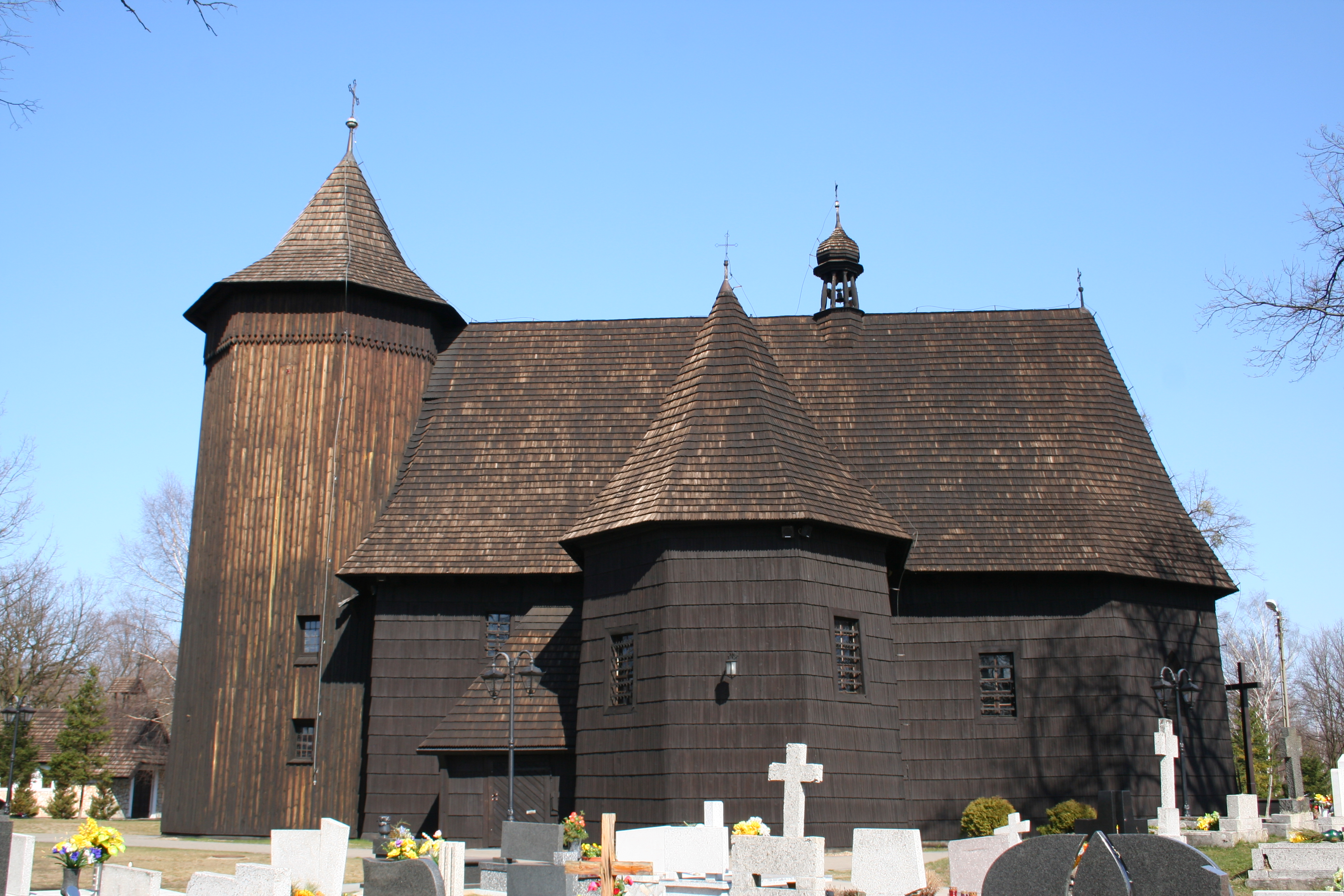
- Church of the Holy Virgin Mary, Queen of the Holy Rosary

- Coat of arms

- Location within Poland
- Coordinates: 50°40′N 18°54′E
- Country: Poland
- Voivodeship: Silesian
- County: Lubliniec
- Gmina: Boronów

Population
  - Total: 2,793

Boronów [bɔˈrɔnuf] is a village in Lubliniec County, Silesian Voivodeship, in southern Poland. It is (since 1993) the seat of the gmina (administrative district) called Gmina Boronów. The village lies on the Liswarta river. Between 1975 and 1998 it was in the former Częstochowa Voivodeship.

The name Boronów originates from the coniferous forests (pl bory) in the area or from the surname Boronowski, who was one of owners of this village. In old chronicles the names Borunow and Bornów are found. But on the herb of Boronów there is a harrow, because it was a sign on the old village's stamp.

== History of Boronów ==
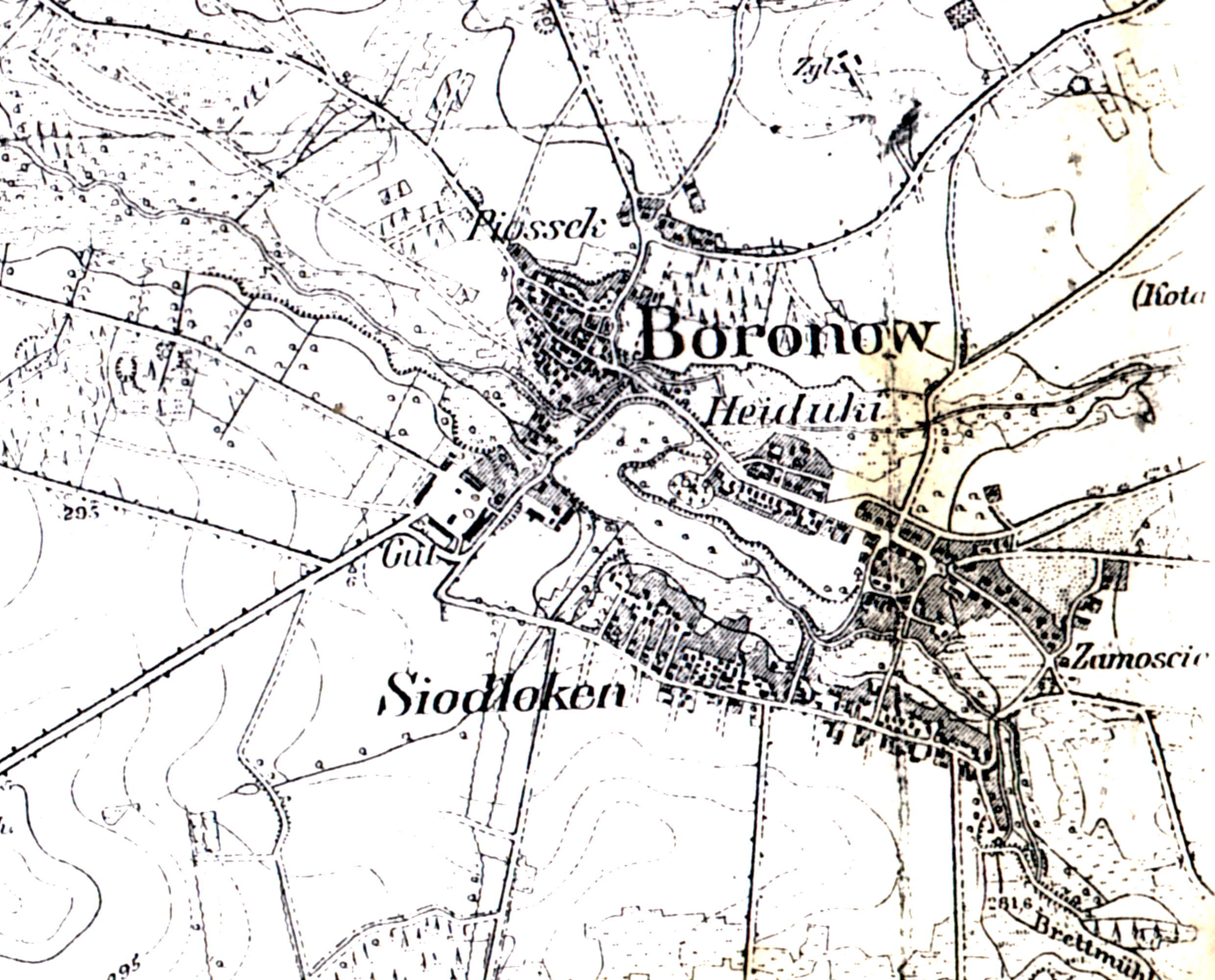
Boronów in the 19th century

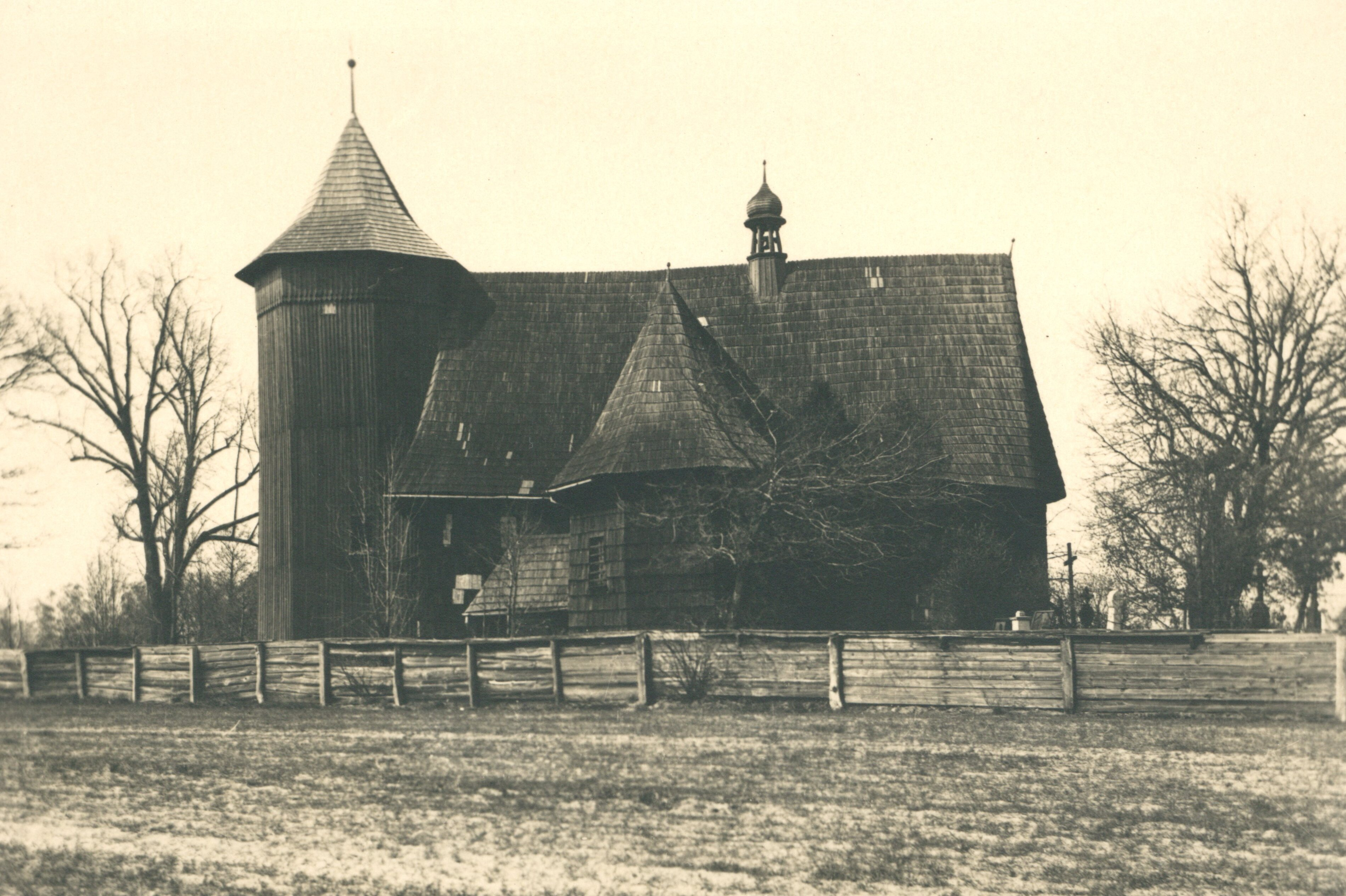
View of the church, ca 1930

The written history of Boronów begins in the 13th century in documents of Casimir III, but in that area older relics from Neolithic and Lusatian culture were found by archeologist in the 1920s.

In 1611 a wooden church was founded by Andrzej Dzierżanowski, owner of Boronów.

In the 19th century the village belonged to Hohenlohe-Ingelfingen's family. In this time it was an industrial village. On its area there were two mines of ore, two breweries and a sawmill. Both mines were the largest in the whole ziemia lubliniecka.

== Twin towns ==
- Międzyzdroje, Poland
