= Upper Liswarta Forests Landscape Park =

Protected area in Poland

Coordinates: 50.7439°N 18.8056°E

- Park Krajobrazowy Lasy nad Górną Liswartą
- IUCN category V (protected landscape/seascape)
- Interactive map of Upper Liswarta Forests Landscape Park
- Location: Silesian Voivodeship
- Area: 507.46 km^{2} (195.93 sq mi)
- Established: 1998

Upper Liswarta Forests Landscape Park (Park Krajobrazowy Lasy nad Górną Liswartą) is a protected area (Landscape Park) in southern Poland, established in 1998, covering an area of 507.46 square kilometres (195.93 sq mi).

The Park lies within Silesian Voivodeship: in Częstochowa County (Gmina Blachownia, Gmina Konopiska, Gmina Starcza), Kłobuck County (Gmina Panki, Gmina Przystajń, Gmina Wręczyca Wielka) and Lubliniec County (Gmina Boronów, Gmina Ciasna, Gmina Herby, Gmina Kochanowice, Gmina Koszęcin, Gmina Woźniki).

Within the Landscape Park are four nature reserves.

There are numerous breeding ponds in the park, which are an important part of the landscape. Peat bogs and spring areas are often found here. In addition to the landscape of fishponds, there are also landscapes: with the predominance of fresh mixed forest habitats; coniferous forests and mixed forests dominated by pine monocultures and the landscape of river valleys with fragments of willow and poplar riparian forests and peat bogs.

== History ==
The first working delineation of the park's boundaries in the area of the upper Liswarta River basin was made by Janusz Herezniak and Izabella Maszczynska in 1982-1983. However, due to the fact that the Law on Spatial Development came into force in 1994, it was not until 1996 that the design documentation for the "Lasy nad Górną Liswartą" Landscape Park was prepared.
