= Aleksandria Druga =

- Village
- Location within Poland
- Coordinates: 50°44′11″N 18°56′6″E
- Country: Poland
- Voivodeship: Silesian
- County: Częstochowa
- Gmina: Konopiska
- Population: 812
- Website: Konopiska

Aleksandria Druga [alɛkˈsandrja ˈdruɡa] is a village in the administrative district of Gmina Konopiska, within Częstochowa County, Silesian Voivodeship, in southern Poland.
