= Kopalnia, Silesian Voivodeship =

Kopalnia
- Village
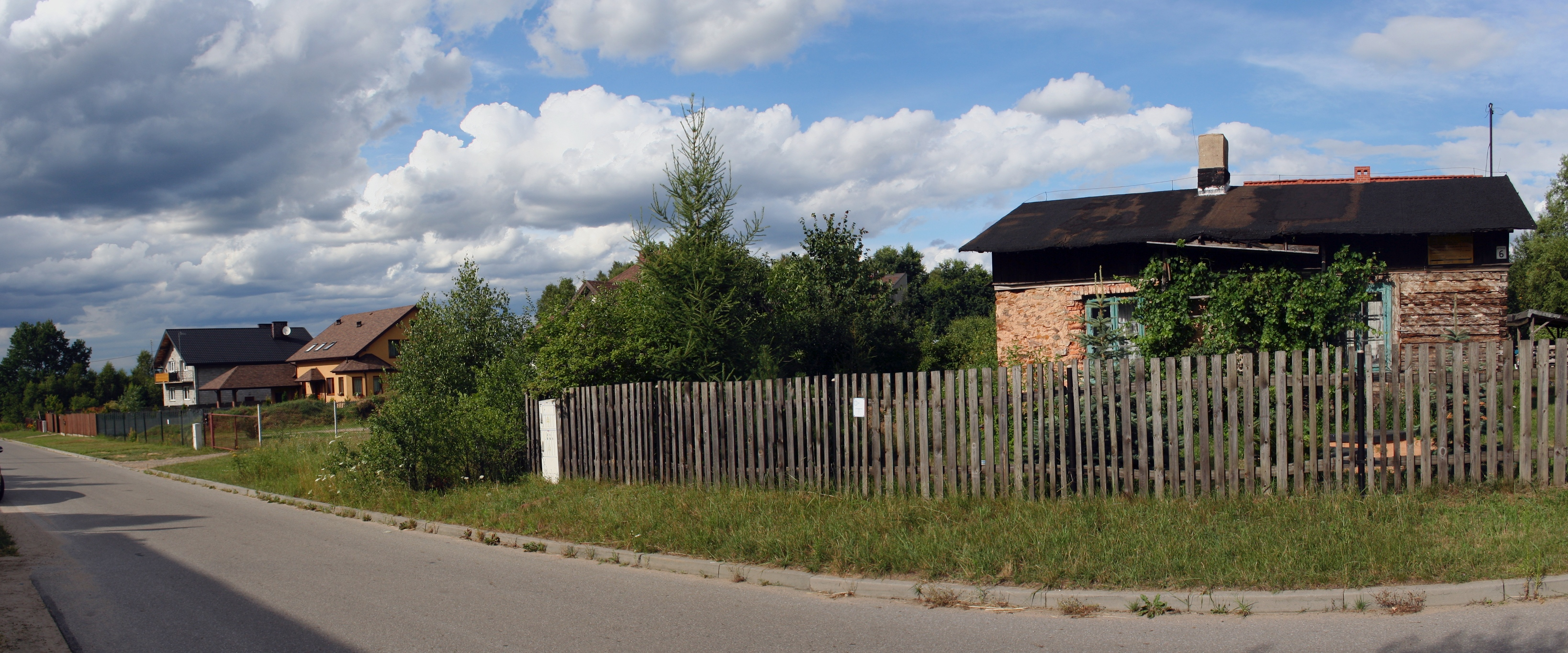

- Location within Poland
- Coordinates: 50°44′N 18°58′E
- Country: Poland
- Voivodeship: Silesian
- County: Częstochowa
- Gmina: Konopiska
- Population: 553
- Website: http://konopiska.home.pl/solectwa/kopalnia.pdf

Kopalnia [kɔˈpalɲa] is a village in the administrative district of Gmina Konopiska, within Częstochowa County, Silesian Voivodeship, in southern Poland.
