= Kowale, Częstochowa County =

Kowale
- Village
- Location within Poland
- Coordinates: 50°42′11″N 18°59′45″E
- Country: Poland
- Voivodeship: Silesian
- County: Częstochowa
- Gmina: Konopiska
- Population: 129

Kowale [kɔˈvalɛ] is a village in the administrative district of Gmina Konopiska, within Częstochowa County, Silesian Voivodeship, in southern Poland.
