= Gmina Boronów =

Gmina Boronów Boronów Commune
- Gmina
- Coat of arms
- Interactive map of Gmina Boronów
- Coordinates (Boronów): 50°41′N 18°54′E
- Country: Poland
- Voivodeship: Silesian
- County: Lubliniec
- Seat: Boronów

Area
  - Total: 56 km^{2} (22 sq mi)

Population (2019-06-30)
  - Total: 3,416
  - Density: 61/km^{2} (160/sq mi)
- Website: http://ug.boronow.pl/

Gmina Boronów is a rural gmina (administrative district) in Lubliniec County, Silesian Voivodeship, in southern Poland. It was formed in 1993, having previously been part of Gmina Herby. Its seat is the village of Boronów, which lies approximately 16 kilometres (10 mi) east of Lubliniec and 49 km (30 mi) north of the regional capital Katowice.

The gmina covers an area of 56 square kilometres (21.6 sq mi), and as of 2019, its total population was 3,416.

The gmina contains part of the protected area called Upper Liswarta Forests Landscape Park.

== Villages ==
Gmina Boronów contains the villages and settlements of Boronów, Cielec, Dębowa Góra, Doły, Grojec, Hucisko, Sitki, Szklana Huta and Zumpy.

== Neighbouring gminas ==
Gmina Boronów is bordered by the gminas of Herby, Konopiska and Koszęcin.

== Twin towns – sister cities ==
Gmina Boronów is twinned with:

- Komorní Lhotka, Czech Republic
