= Hutki, Silesian Voivodeship =

Hutki
- Village
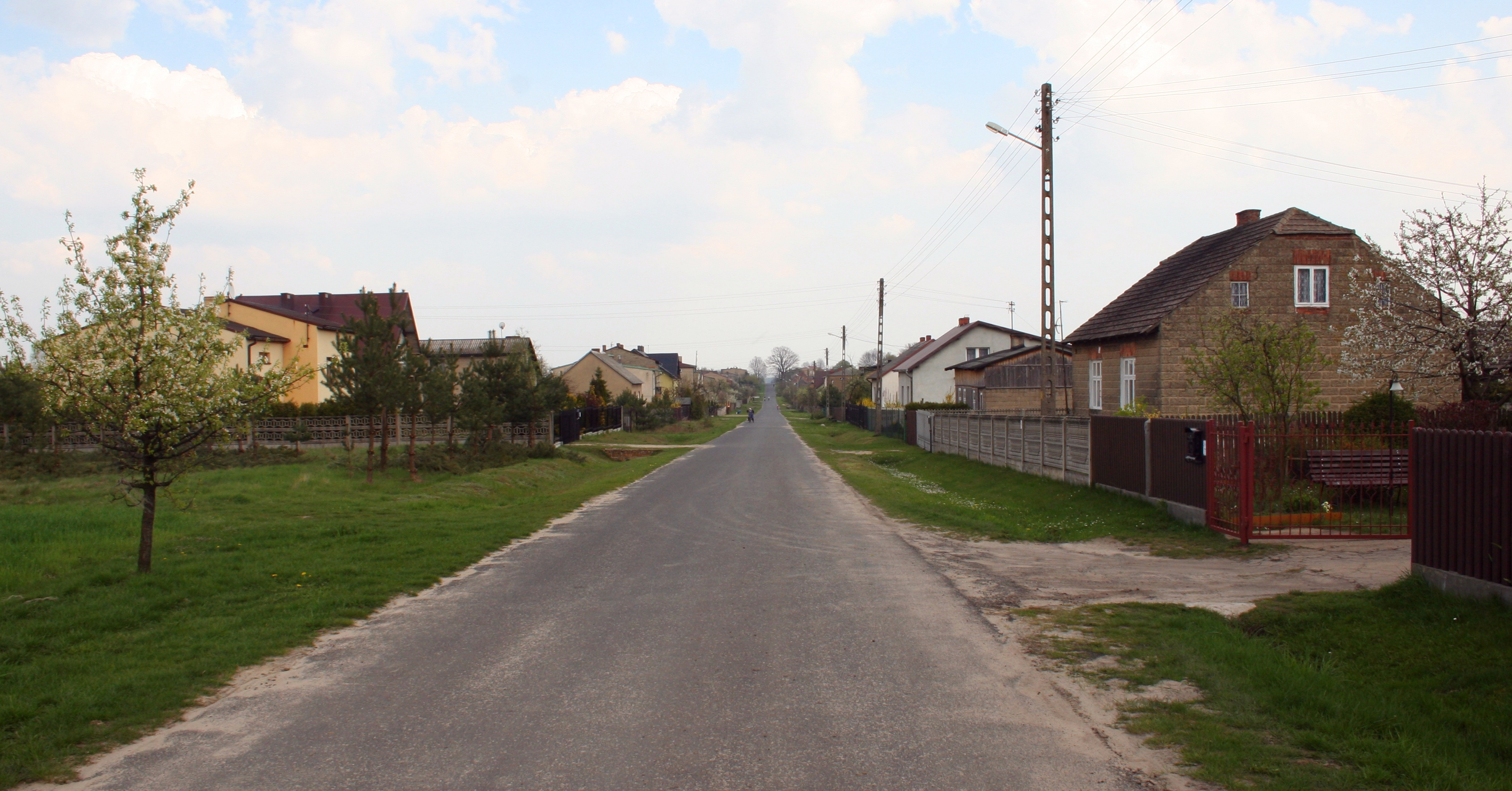

- Location within Poland
- Coordinates: 50°40′52″N 19°0′23″E
- Country: Poland
- Voivodeship: Silesian
- County: Częstochowa
- Gmina: Konopiska
- Population: 1,004
- Website: http://konopiska.home.pl/solectwa/hutki.pdf

Hutki [ˈxutki] is a village in the administrative district of Gmina Konopiska, within Częstochowa County, Silesian Voivodeship, in southern Poland.
