= Wąsosz, Gmina Konopiska =

Wąsosz
- Village
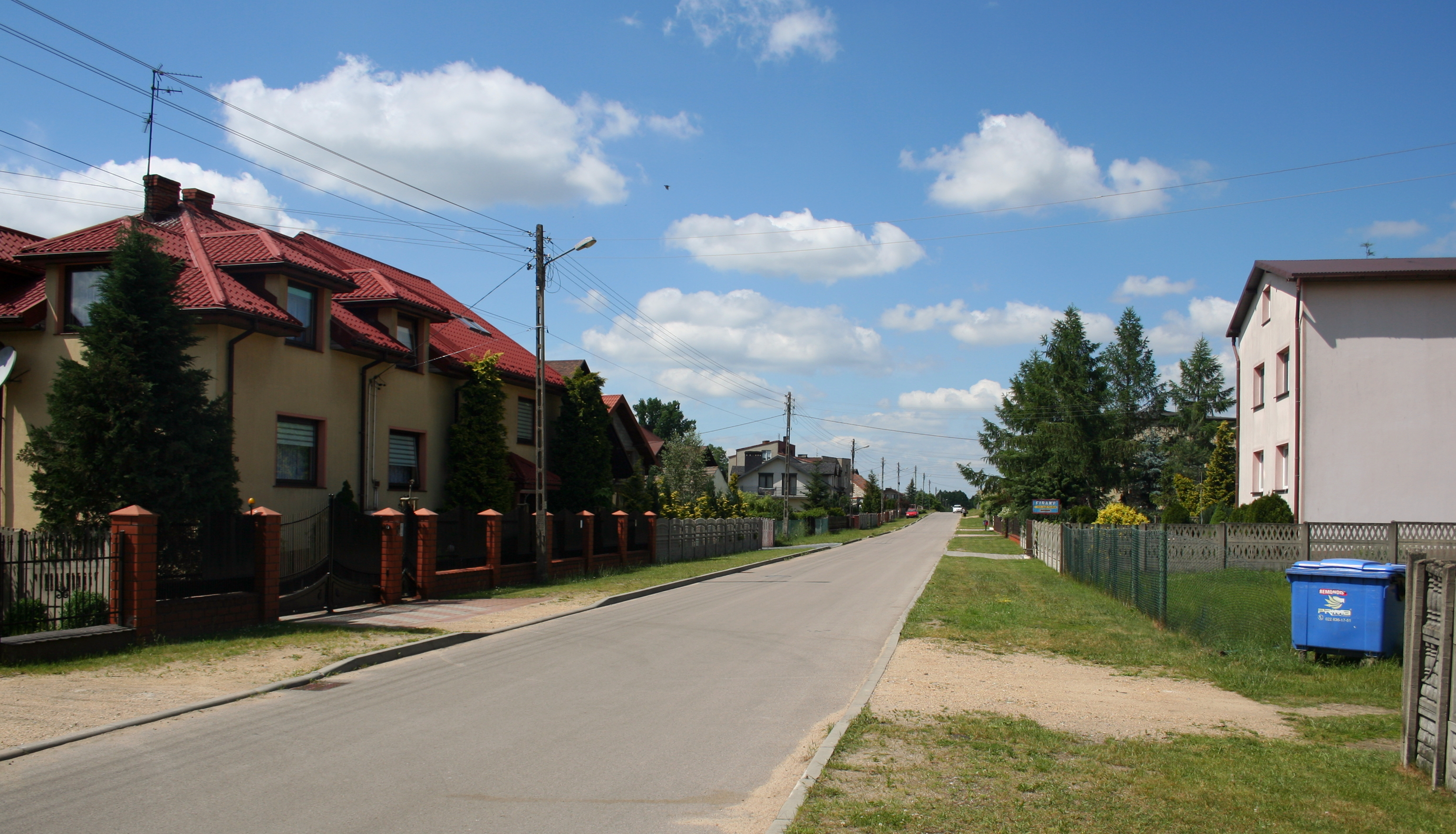

- Location within Poland
- Coordinates: 50°44′N 19°3′E
- Country: Poland
- Voivodeship: Silesian
- County: Częstochowa
- Gmina: Konopiska

Population
  - Total: 565
- Postal code: 42-274
- Website: http://konopiska.home.pl/solectwa/wasosz.pdf

Wąsosz [ˈvɔ̃sɔʂ] is a village in the administrative district of Gmina Konopiska, within Częstochowa County, Silesian Voivodeship, in southern Poland.
