= Kolonia Łojki =

- Village
- Location within Poland
- Coordinates: 50°47′52″N 18°59′13″E
- Country: Poland
- Voivodeship: Silesian
- County: Częstochowa
- Gmina: Blachownia

Kolonia Łojki [kɔˈlɔɲa ˈwɔi̯ki] is a village in the administrative district of Gmina Blachownia, within Częstochowa County, Silesian Voivodeship, in southern Poland.
