= Grojec, Silesian Voivodeship =

Grojec
- Village
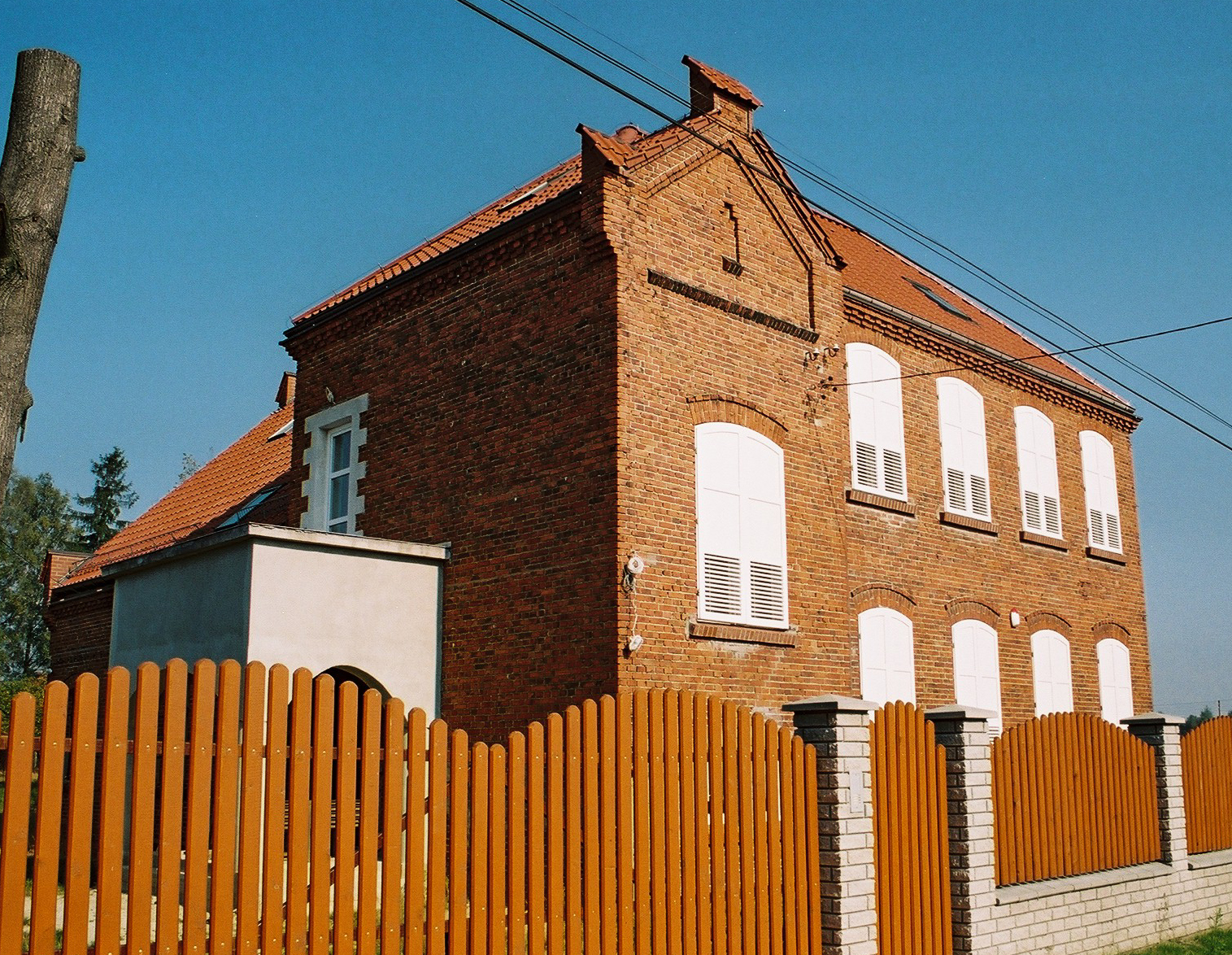
- Former school building

- Location within Poland
- Coordinates: 50°39′N 18°57′E
- Country: Poland
- Voivodeship: Silesian
- County: Lubliniec
- Gmina: Boronów
- Population: 125

Grojec [ˈɡrɔjɛt͡s] is a village in the administrative district of Gmina Boronów, within Lubliniec County, Silesian Voivodeship, in southern Poland.
