= Szklana Huta, Silesian Voivodeship =

Szklana Huta
- Settlement
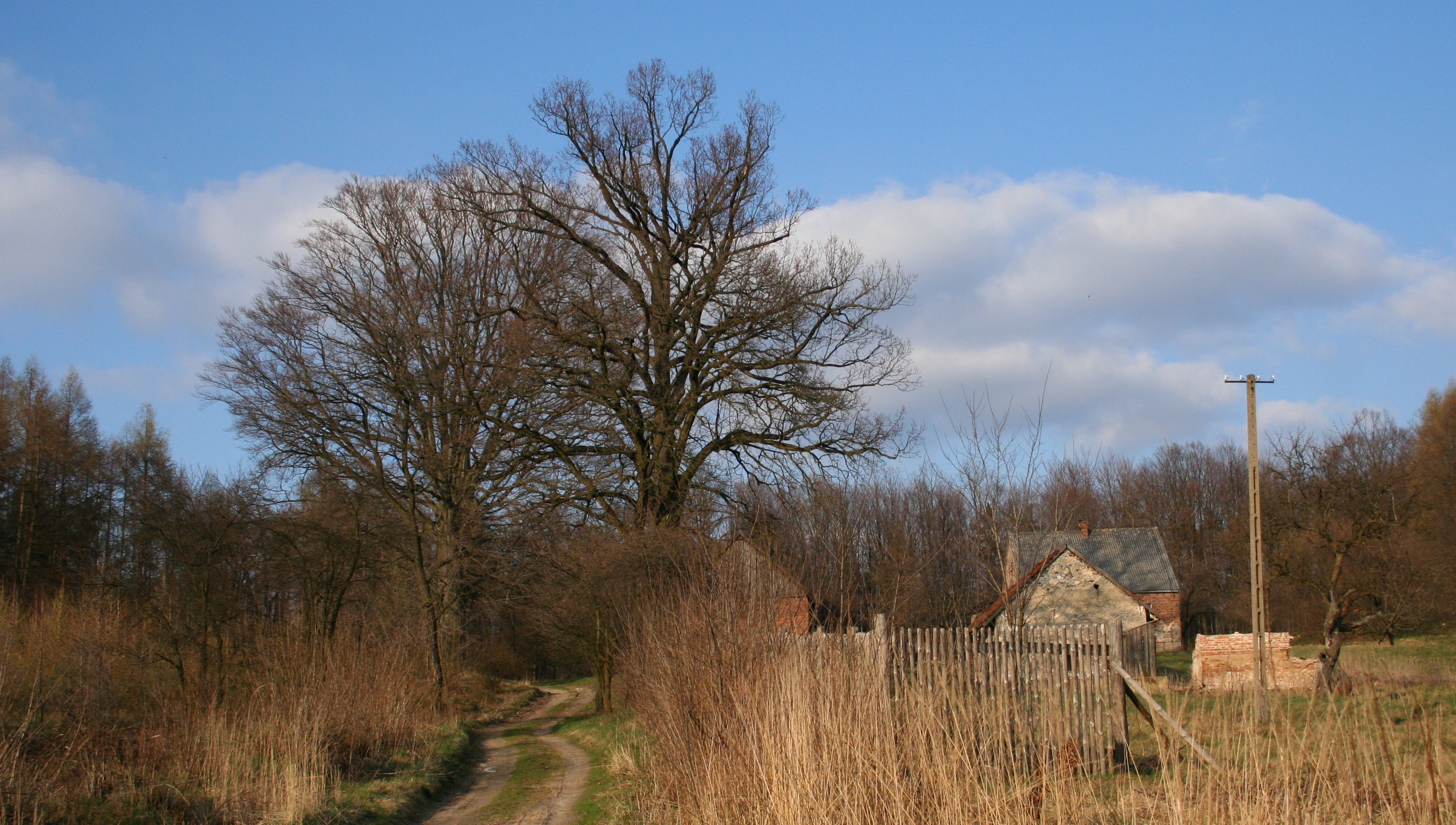
- Szklana Huta

- Location within Poland
- Coordinates: 50°41′N 18°57′E
- Country: Poland
- Voivodeship: Silesian
- County: Lubliniec
- Gmina: Boronów
- Population: 0

Szklana Huta [ˈʂklana ˈxuta] is a former settlement in the administrative district of Gmina Boronów, within Lubliniec County, Silesian Voivodeship, in southern Poland.
