= Dębowa Góra, Silesian Voivodeship =

Dębowa Góra
- Village
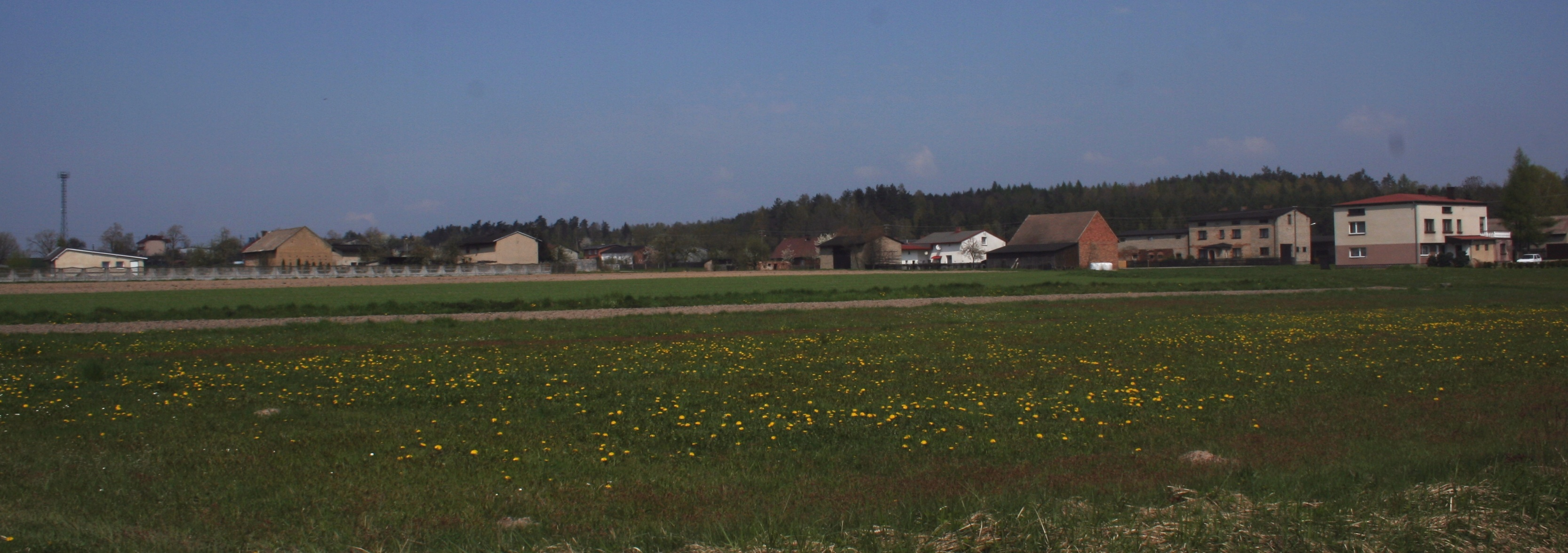
- Dębowa Góra

- Location within Poland
- Coordinates: 50°41′N 18°56′E
- Country: Poland
- Voivodeship: Silesian
- County: Lubliniec
- Gmina: Boronów
- Population: 111

Dębowa Góra [dɛmˈbɔva ˈɡura] is a village in the administrative district of Gmina Boronów, within Lubliniec County, Silesian Voivodeship, in southern Poland.
