= Hucisko, Lubliniec County =

Hucisko
- Village
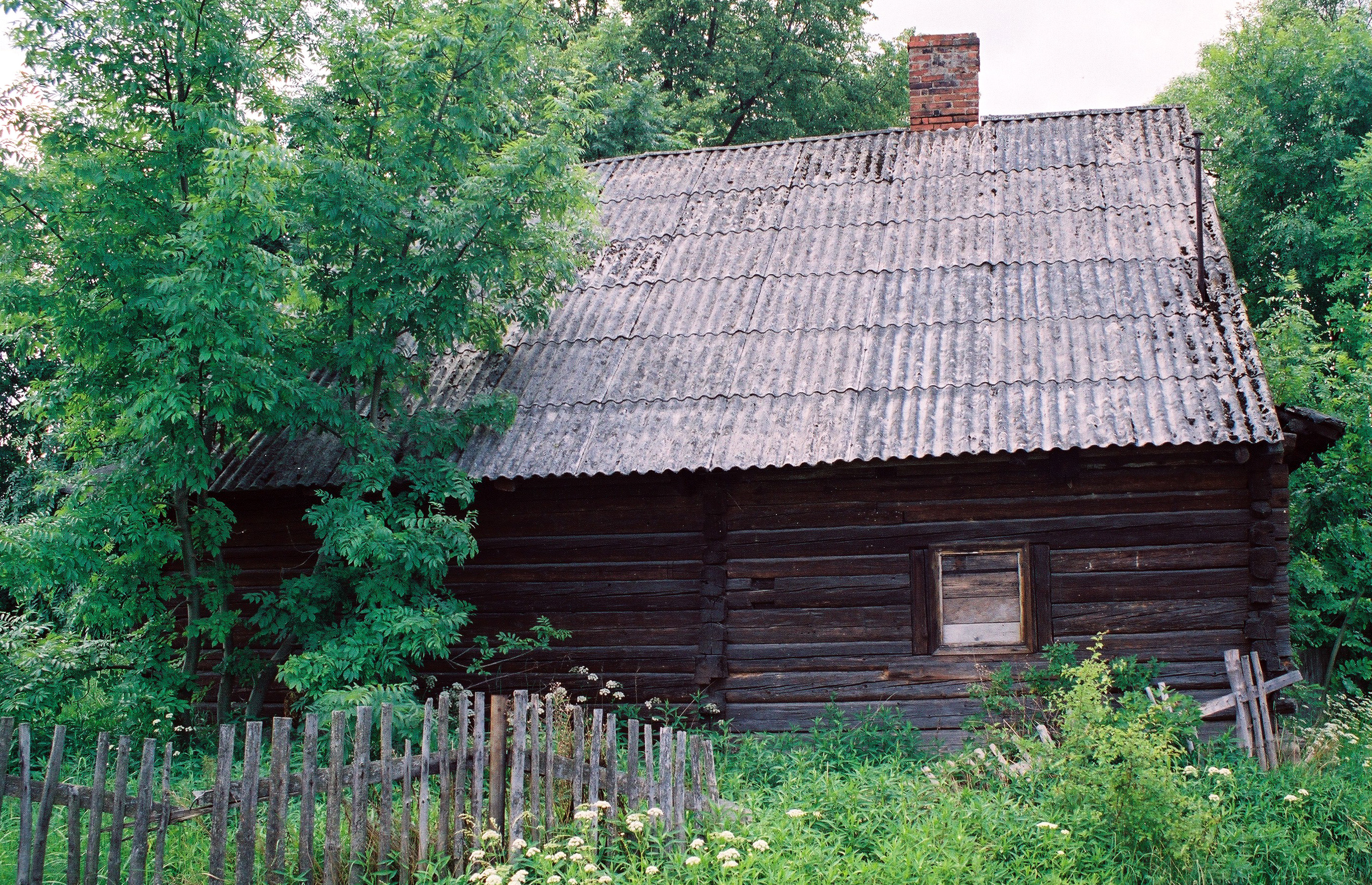
- Wooden house

- Location within Poland
- Coordinates: 50°39′N 18°56′E
- Country: Poland
- Voivodeship: Silesian
- County: Lubliniec
- Gmina: Boronów
- Population: 124

Hucisko [xuˈt͡ɕiskɔ] is a village in the administrative district of Gmina Boronów, within Lubliniec County, Silesian Voivodeship, in southern Poland.
