= Łaziec, Silesian Voivodeship =

Łaziec
- Village
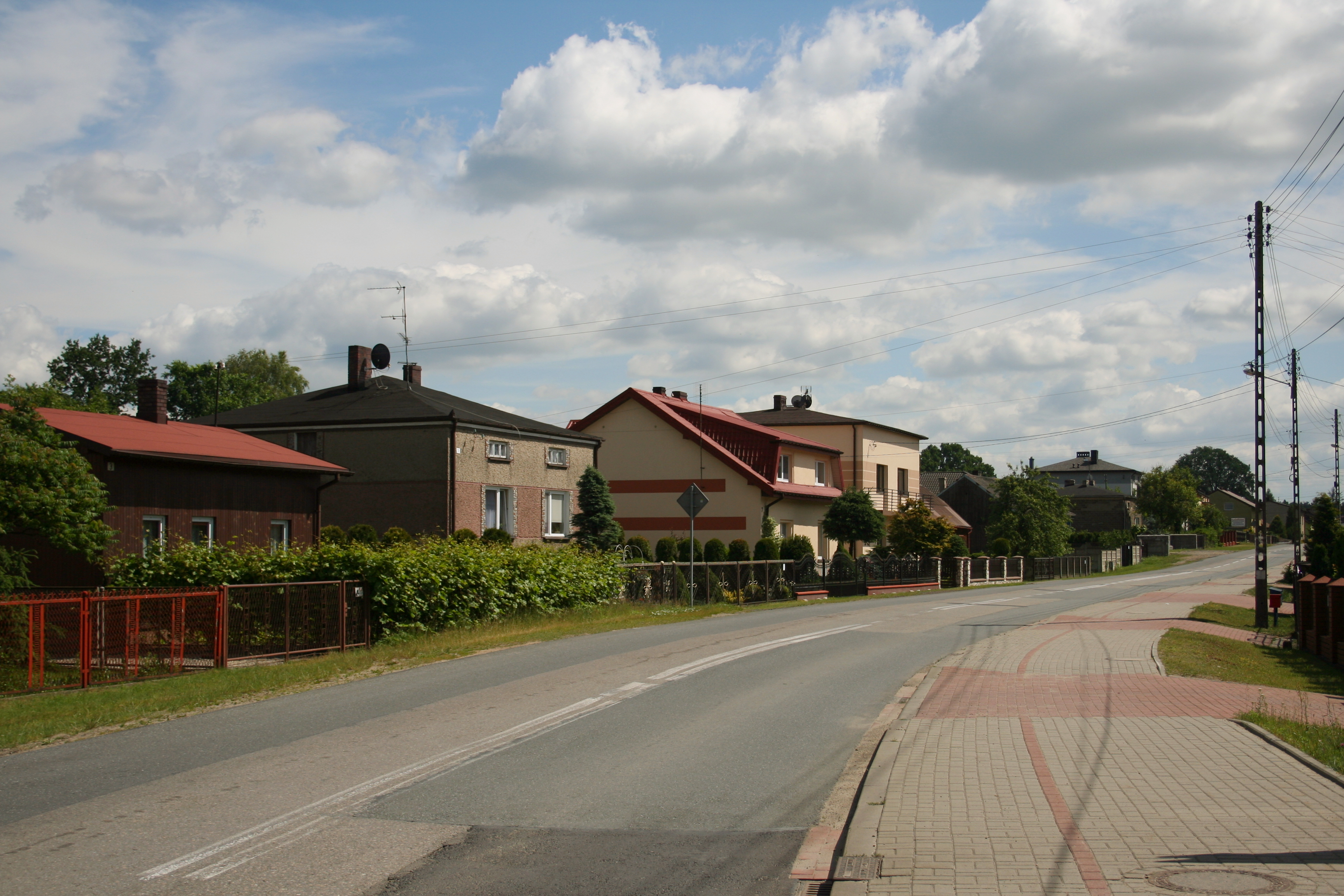

- Location within Poland
- Coordinates: 50°43′N 19°2′E
- Country: Poland
- Voivodeship: Silesian
- County: Częstochowa
- Gmina: Konopiska
- Population: 466
- Website: http://konopiska.home.pl/solectwa/laziec.pdf

Łaziec [ˈwaʑɛt͡s] is a village in the administrative district of Gmina Konopiska, within Częstochowa County, Silesian Voivodeship, in southern Poland.
