= Doły, Silesian Voivodeship =

Doły
- Village
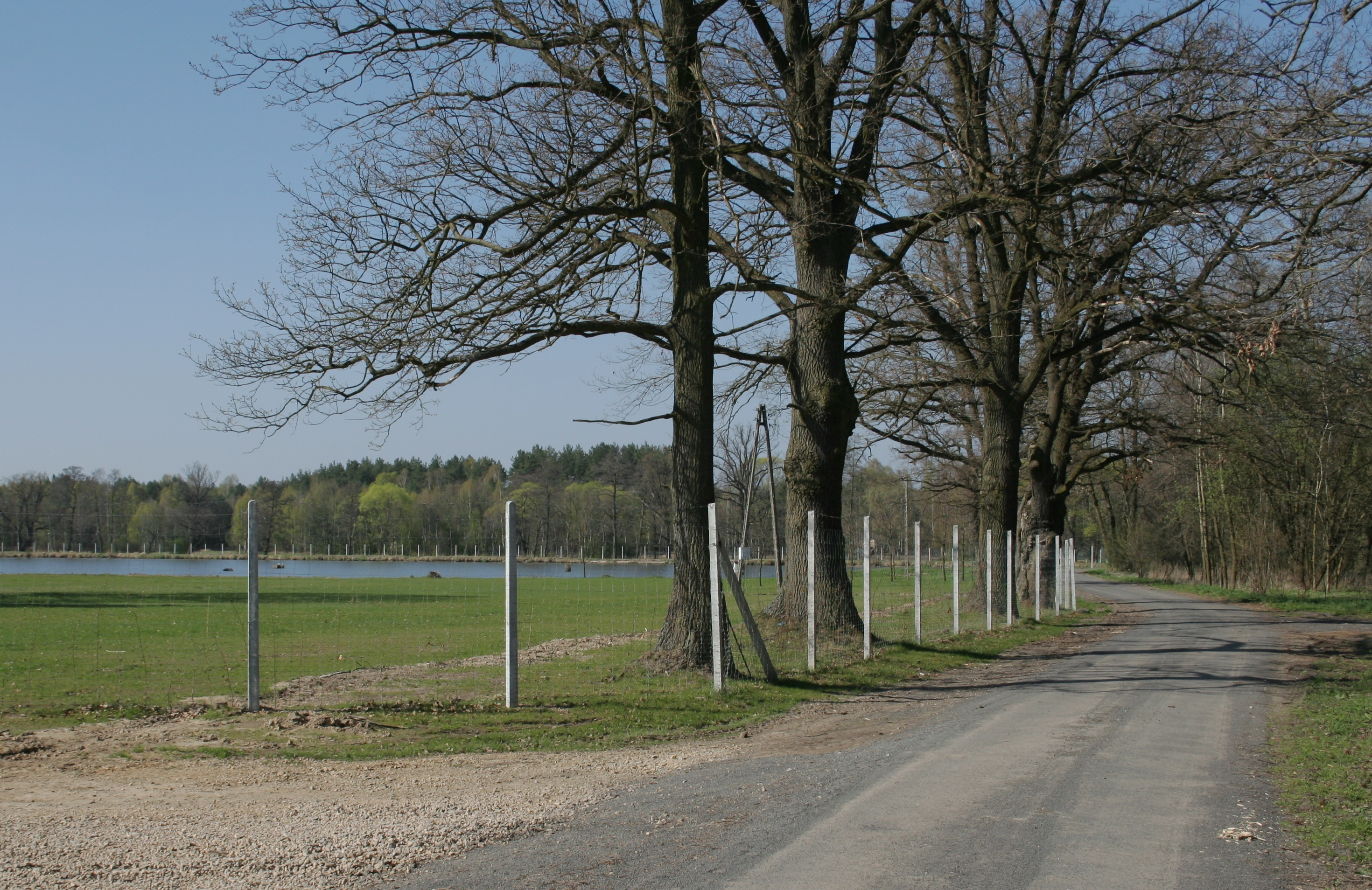
- Road through the village

- Location within Poland
- Coordinates: 50°41′N 18°53′E
- Country: Poland
- Voivodeship: Silesian
- County: Lubliniec
- Gmina: Boronów
- Population: 8

Doły [ˈdɔwɨ] is a village in the administrative district of Gmina Boronów, within Lubliniec County, Silesian Voivodeship, in southern Poland.
